= Holby City series 10 =

British medical drama television series

Holby City
- Series 10
- No. of episodes: 53

Release
- Original network: BBC One
- Original release: 16 October 2007 – 14 October 2008

Series chronology
- ← Previous; Series 9 Next → Series 11

The tenth series of the British medical drama television series Holby City commenced airing in the United Kingdom on BBC One on 16 October 2007, and concluded on 14 October 2008.

== Cast ==
=== Main characters ===
- Jane Asher as Anne-Marie, Lady Byrne (episodes 31–41)
- Rakie Ayola as Kyla Tyson
- Paul Bradley as Elliot Hope
- Tom Chambers as Sam Strachan
- Sharon D. Clarke as Lola Griffin (until episode 53)
- Hari Dhillon as Michael Spence (from episode 6)
- Ade Edmondson as Abra Durant (episodes 33–44 and 53)
- Rebecca Grant as Daisha Anderson (from episode 24)
- Tina Hobley as Chrissie Williams (until episode 26)
- Jaye Jacobs as Donna Jackson
- Patsy Kensit as Faye Byrne
- Nadine Lewington as Maddy Young
- Rosie Marcel as Jac Naylor
- Amanda Mealing as Connie Beauchamp
- Duncan Pow as Linden Cullen (from episode 14)
- Robert Powell as Mark Williams
- Hugh Quarshie as Ric Griffin
- Luke Roberts as Joseph Byrne
- Phoebe Thomas as Maria Kendall
- Peter Wingfield as Dan Clifford (until episode 2, episode 25)

=== Recurring and guest characters ===
- Dominic Colchester as Jamie Norton (from episode 39)
- Stella Gonet as Jayne Grayson
- Andrew Lewis as Paul Rose
- Alex Macqueen as Keith Greene
- Conor Mullen as Stuart McElroy (episodes 4–18)
- Sandra Voe as Elizabeth Mills (episode 53)

== Episodes ==
No. overall	No. in series	Title	Directed by	Written by	Original release date	Viewers (millions)
368	1	"Bitter from the Sweet"	David Innes Edwards	Mark Cairns	16 October 2007	5.81
Lola reasserts her control over the AAU in the wake of Abra's departure. Kyla is caught drinking at work by Faye. Dan and Maddy continue to flirt, but the re-appearance of Louise strains relations between them. On the eve of Gina's death, James is shot by drug dealers, leaving Elliot to operate on his own son. Lola is promoted to Head of AAU by Jayne.
369	2	"The Last Throw"	David Innes Edwards	Andrew Holden	23 October 2007	5.63
Joseph tricks Jac into believing there is a vacant Consultancy available on AAU. Dan plans to leave the country with Louise, and confesses their affair to Alex. Louise tells Dan she won't go away with him, so Maddy invites herself along instead. Ultimately, Dan leaves Holby alone, leaving Maddy heartbroken. James convinces Elliot to pay off his drug debt, and tricks him out of a further £500 with which to buy more heroin. Dan Clifford departs.
370	3	"No One Likes a Cry Baby"	Edward Bennett	Martha Hillier	30 October 2007	6.18
Jac is interviewed for Dan's vacant Consultancy post, but is dismayed to find Lady Bryne is on the panel. She insinuates to Joseph that she is suffering from delayed concussion as a result of him hitting her, and unless he convinces his mother to support her application, she will report his violence. She discovers that Lady Byrne was in favour of her promotion anyway, however loses out due to Lola signing her off sick as a result of her headaches. James is arrested for attempted murder, and Maddy and Sam lose baby Grace.
371	4	"The Apprentice"	Edward Bennett	Martha Hillier	6 November 2007	5.95
Kyla is drunk on the wards, and accidentally causes the deaths of two patients due to negligence. Faye and Ric endeavour to cover up for her, but quickly begin to lose their patience. Connie announces she intends to take a sabbatical to Hamburg, and her replacement, Stuart McElroy is introduced. He selects Joseph to act up in Connie's absence, and deems Sam too immature for the task. Mark promises Elliot he will stop using cocaine, and he and Chrissie reminisce on the one year anniversary of Tricia's death.: First Appearance of Stuart McElroy*
372	5	"Dust Off Your Wings"	Bill MacLeod	Abi Bown	13 November 2007	6.08
Sam gets a call for an appointment at the STD clinic after Maddie and Zoe are diagnosed with chlamydia. Although clear, the tests show up a more serious problem. Chrissie and Stuart butt heads in Darwin but he finds a way to charm her. Kyla's denial of her drinking problem causes problems with everyone, this results in an altercation with Faye. However it takes a patient to convince her to seek counseling and to encounter another Holby staff member - Stuart McElroy.
373	6	"Unfinished Symphony"	Bill MacLeod	Sam Wheats	20 November 2007	6.23
New consultant general surgeon Michael Spence arrives at Holby and is attacked by an unidentified assailant. This assailant later turns out to be the partner of a staff member Michael had an affair with at his previous job. Maria also starts her first day at Holby as staff nurse and it turns out to be an eventful day. Maddie and Elliott both prompt Sam to pick up his test results but he avoids it until in the end he gets Elliott to check. The results are not good - Sam has Non-Hodgkin's Lymphoma, Stage 3. Elliott gets a visitors pass to visit his son at Wormwood Scrubs.
374	7	"Someone To Watch Over Me"	Robert Del Maestro	Graham Mitchell	27 November 2007	6.12
Sam gets a formal diagnosis of his Non-Hodgkin lymphoma and hits rock bottom but it takes a near death incident in his car to get him back on form and shave his head in readiness for treatment. The A.E.D. is flooded with casualties from a train crash near Holby caused by a detonated explosion. Jac and Donna trade barbs in their quest for Michael Spence's approval. Michael tells Jac he knows of her father. Mark's cocaine addiction gets serious and admits it to Elliott.
375	8	"Mirror Man"	Robert Del Maestro	Jake Riddell	4 December 2007	6.27
Not content with trying to prove herself against Joseph, Jac now sets her sights on usurping Michael and making him look bad in front of the CEO. But Jac hadn't figured on the intervention of Donna and has to publicly apologize to Michael and Jayne after she is caught out. Joseph, of course, takes great joy in this. Meanwhile, Elliott tells Chrissie about Mark's cocaine problem and at first she does not believe it until she finds cocaine stashed in Mark's desk and has an altercation with Doug, Mark's dealer. With the help of Stuart she manages to get Mark to acknowledge his problem and seek support under the guise of further training.
376	9	"The Reckoning"	Rob Evans	Chris Murray	11 December 2007	5.91
Stuart tries hard to win over Chrissie but nearly crashes and burns. Sam refuses to tell the staff about his chemotherapy treatment but it leaves Chrissie suspicious. This leaves Stuart with no option but to tell her and ask her to let Sam tell her in his own time. Meanwhile, hearing that there will be a karaoke at the staff Christmas party, Joseph practices on his own but is caught out by several staff. Elsewhere, Elliott and Martha go to see James and talk about his rehabilitation in prison, only for Elliott to find out that James tried to commit suicide. James' refusal to see things Elliott's way sees Elliott walking away from him despite Martha's pleas. And then there's sexual health nurse Tim from the S.T.I. Clinic. He's furious that he's being ignored by all the Holby staff and so he takes matters in his own hands. In the Holby reception area he launches a frenzied attack with a crossbow and hits Martha, Faye and Zoe with his crossbows injuring them seriously.
377	10	"Into the Void"	Rob Evans	Tony McHale	19 December 2007	5.16
9-year-old Izzy is in trouble when a donor heart for her is diverted by the police. Martha is injured when a madman goes on the loose with a crossbow, and James is tried at court. Elliot's life is crumbling because of all this.
378	11	"Elliot's Wonderful Life"	David Innes Edwards	Tony McHale	27 December 2007	6.91
Elliot considers suicide, but a strange old man named George changes history so Elliot never existed. Connie returns from her trip.
379	12	"For Your Consideration"	Christopher King	Matthew Evans	1 January 2008	6.15
Connie returns to the hospital and making enemies of the staff. Donna believes she is nominated for the nurse of the year award.
380	13	"Queen of Hearts"	Christopher King	Martha Hillier	8 January 2008	6.04
Connie continues to exonerate her staff, but suddenly realises she needs them back on side. Fayes first day back and already she is in an intolerable situation.
381	14	"Stolen"	James Henry	Martin Jameson	15 January 2008	6.18
New AAU Surgical Consultant Linden Cullen arrives and instantly clashing with Lola Griffin. Connie gets Stuart to sign Sam off sick for a week.: First Appearance of Linden Cullen*
382	15	"Physician, Heal Thyself"	James Henry	Dana Fainaru	22 January 2008	5.99
Joseph's comatose brother arrives in Holby. Faye finds out the truth and reveals a secret from her past.
383	16	"The Key is Fear"	Indra Bhose	Len Collin	29 January 2008	6.07
Elliot returns from his holiday to Mexico. Connie holds a meeting with the Consultants to discuss Sam's current state of health.
384	17	"Final Cut"	Indra Bhose	Joe Ainsworth	5 February 2008	6.47
Stuart holds Chrissie captive in Darwin theatre's but Connie disturbs him.
385	18	"The Extra Mile"	Mike Cocker	Martha Hillier	12 February 2008	6.62
Connie plays detective to find out what was really happening in that theatre. Stuart is arrested and taken away by the police. Stuart McElroy departs.
386	19	"Complications Ensue"	Mike Cocker	Peter Lloyd	19 February 2008	6.11
Phillip Lawlor is visiting the hospital and Connie does her best to get rid of Jac Naylor to him, but Joseph causes the plan to backfire.
387	20	"On A Mission"	Fraser MacDonald	Martha Hillier	26 February 2008	6.50
Kyla restarts work as a nurse after her demotion. Trying to prove herself Jac proposes a risky operation on a terminally ill patient. This is turned down by Elliott, and draws the attention of Philip Lawler who offers her a job if she can pull it off. Unfortunately Jac cannot go through with the operation and turns to lay preacher Kev for inspiration. Faye's first husband Donald Hewson's grave is exhumed for a postmortem. Elsewhere, Linden refuses to treat a female gynae patient and it is up to Maddie to get to the bottom of it.
388	21	"We Serve All Who Come To Us"	Fraser MacDonald	Mark Cairns	4 March 2008	5.74
Connie forgets her priorities when she and Elliot lock horns over a controversial case, leading to a potential personal disaster. Linden is still riddled with guilt over a young woman he was unable to treat, causing Mark to worry about the decisions he is making today. Meanwhile, Maria does her best to get her head around her relationship with Sam.
389	22	"No Cars Go"	Jamie Annett	Ian Kershaw	11 March 2008	5.99
Elliot comforts Connie while Grace lays in I.C.U. Linden operates on Chloe Baxter and continues to keep his past hidden making Maddy suspicious.
390	23	"Long Dark Night"	Jamie Annett	Martin Jameson	12 March 2008	5.32
Grace has to have lung surgery. Chloe Baxter dies, leaving Linden upset. Connie and Sam have a vicious argument causing Sam to collapse with sepsis.
391	24	"12 Hour Nightmare"	Bill MacLeod	Tony McHale	18 March 2008	6.89
HolbyBlue crossover. Alan Clooney turns back up at the hospital. Linden later finds him on the landing with a pair of scissors poking through his chest, whilst Jac hangs around the background. Michael and Connie clash over Sam's treatment. Maria spends most of her day reading to Sam.
392	25	"Love Will Tear Us Apart"	Bill MacLeod	Veronica Henry	25 March 2008	6.46
Dan calls Maddie out of the blue and tells her he's back for a short while and wants to meet up but events conspire to keep them apart and Maddie misses her chance to see him which breaks her heart. Donna's relationship with Michael deteriorates. Faye becomes mad with Joseph for defending Jac's innocence when he wouldn't support her when allegations about her late husband surfaced but with Elliott acting as a mediator they manage to resolve their issues. Lady Byrne and Elliott become close when he helps her with a speech.: Guest Appearance of Peter Wingfield as Dan Clifford*
393	26	"All This Useless Beauty"	Dominic Leclerc	Gert Thomas	1 April 2008	5.85
Chrissie finds out that Stuart has given her cheque for £25,000 in compensation. And after a patient she got close to dies, she decides to leave Holby for a while. Michael and Connie's rivalry continues.: Chrissie Williams departs*
394	27	"Pants on Fire"	Dominic Leclerc	Joe Ainsworth	8 April 2008	5.42
Joseph is suspicious when Faye rushes off to the police station to get her ex-husband's exhumation results. The heat turns up as Donna gets her claws into Michael. Donna is suspicious of Michael and Connie going for a drink after work.
395	28	"You're So Vain"	Mike Cocker	Jeff Dodds	15 April 2008	5.94
Jayne gets Lady Byrne to take over the Byrne foundation as CEO. Ric and Connie take the mick out of Michael's dress sense.
396	29	"The Softest Music"	Mike Cocker	Dan Sefton	22 April 2008	5.19
Elliot is made the Medical Advisor of the Byrne foundation. Connie and Elliot battle to save two teenage heart transplant patients with tragic consequences.
397	30	"Battle of Who Could Care Less"	Ian Jackson	Matthew Evans	29 April 2008	5.45
Daisha Andersons boyfriend publicly dumps her and she is made ambassador of the Byrne foundation. Connie becomes suspicious of Donna's necklace and Michael tries to explain the situation to Connie. Joseph treats and a troublesome couple. Percy 'Abra' Durant returns.
398	31	"Springflower"	Ian Jackson	Sebastian Baczkiewicz	6 May 2008	5.04
Jayne commendates Linden for his work in AEU at the Holby's Heads of Department meeting and he is later horrified to discover that Jayne had installed cameras in his theatre so that the Heads of Department would be able to observe him that day. But Connie is not impressed and refuses to attend the viewing. She sends Jac who warns Linden not to upset Connie. Elliott persuades Lady Byrne to fund the expensive operation of a prospective Olympic athlete but she dies before she can have the operation. Distraught, Elliott tenders his resignation as medical advisor of Lady's Byrne's charity because he is not focusing on his patients but she refuses. Abra hurts himself at Ric's flat and turns up in Holby where Ric fixes him up and hides him in the basement. But Abra is discovered and reported to a furious Jayne who orders him to stay as far away from Holby as he can. Later, at another Head of Department meeting Linden turns the spotlight away from him and congratulates Connie - Connie is immediately won over.
399	32	"TKO San Francisco"	Robert Del Maestro	Joe Ainsworth	13 May 2008	5.10
Faye told Joseph that she might be pregnant but Joseph didn't take the news too well. Daisha refused to treat her new landlord (and Mark's friend) who'd been admitted to AAU. It later transpired that Daisha caused the injury by burning him with a red hot iron after he'd let himself into her room and tried to grope her. Mark was horrified and confronted him who admitted that Daisha was asking for it. Mark then offered Daisha a room at his place. Ric told Abra that a position had come up on Keller and convinced an unimpressed Jayne to put him on the shortlist. Kyla found Abra in Ric's office but after questioning him he ignores her. After talking with his mother Joseph turned to Sam for advice who congratulated him. Joseph then went and bought an engagement ring but when he went to look for Faye she had left early to meet a mystery man named Christopher.
400	33	"Any Port in a Storm"	Robert Del Maestro	Daisy Coulam	20 May 2008	5.11
Maria nursed a patient named Alex who she believed to be her birth mother. Before Maria could talk to her Alex took a turn for the worse. Joseph presented Faye with an engagement ring and she eventually said yes. However, her happiness quickly vanished when she found her first husband's medical file in Joseph's briefcase. When questioned Joseph insisted he'd just wanted to clear her name but Faye didn't believe him and gave him back the ring. Meanwhile, Kyla found Abra drowning his sorrows in the bar after botching up his interview for the job on Keller. Wrestling with her demons she refused to join him and walked away.
401	34	"Send No Flowers"	Rob Evans	Abi Bown	27 May 2008	4.66
Maria's birth mother Alex's condition stabilised but was told she had to have a hysterectomy which distresses Alex who didn't want to lose her chance of having children with her husband. Alex told Maria that she had given birth when she was 15 but had to give her up. Maria encourages Alex to tell her husband. Abra tried to leave Holby but just before he did Ric got into difficulties and Abra was forced to help save the patient. Jayne agreed to find a job for Abra. Lady Byrne and Elliot spent the day organising a charity fund-raiser. Elsewhere, Kyla was shocked to discover her son Max visiting a little boy. But Max did a runner when Kyla tried to talk to him and he suddenly collapsed and started fitting on the floor.
402	35	"Natural Justice"	Rob Evans	Al Smith	3 June 2008	5.17
Michael managed to revive Max and Connie tells Kyla that he needs surgery. But a decision about surgery can only be agreed when Max's foster parents Lindsey and Andrew arrive. Kyla found out that Lindsey had been out drinking and told Max's social worker that Lindsey was an alcoholic and tried to persuade him to let her have Max back. But Roger wouldn't believe her and insisted Max was better off in his new home. Meanwhile, Michael suspected Abra was a liability after he struggled during an operation. After another operation when pear-shaped and with some persuasion from Ric, Michael agreed to cover for Abra. Meanwhile, Elliot bottled out of a coffee date with Lady Byrne but later apologised and agreed to take her out for a coffee.
403	36	"Love You"	Farren Blackburn	Martin Jameson	5 June 2008	4.74
Kyla challenges Max's foster mother Lindsey but she reports Kyla. Max defends his foster mother but Kyla refuses to give in and forces a confrontation between Lindsey, herself and Roger, the social worker, which shows Lindsey's true character. Seeing this, Max tells Kyla he wants to live with her again. Elliott and Lady Byrne's relationship develops. Faye's ex-stepson Carl demands £20,000 cash from Faye to pay off people who are after him. If she doesn't, he threatens to tell his accosters who she is. Faye borrows £5,000 from Joseph but at the last minute refuses to give it to Carl. Later, Carl is found badly beaten and brought to Holby. Joseph and Elliott try to save him but he dies on the operating table. Smelling a rat, Jac follows Faye to a facility named Greenlands where she is told Faye is meeting her husband Lucas Michaels there. Jac leaves to go and tell Joseph but whilst overtaking a tractor she crashes into an oncoming van and is left unconscious.
404	37	"Doctor's Dilemma"	Farren Blackburn	Martha Hillier	18 June 2008	5.59
Jac is left unconscious after her motorcycle crash and later in hospital Linden is confused by her ramblings about Faye and Lucas. Joseph rushed to Jac's bedside as Faye did her best to stall him fearing Jac would reveal her secret. Linden asked Joseph about Lucas but Faye denied any knowledge. Jac went into arrest having suffered an overdose of medication but luckily came round. Jac later woke up with Joseph at her side and she told him about Faye's marriage to Lucas. Elsewhere, Elliot and Lady Byrne were involved in a fund-raising event for the Byrne Foundation and later at the event Elliot told Lady Byrne their romance could not continue as he was still in love with Gina. Donna arranged a Butler Sale to raise money and asked Michael to take part. To Michael's delight, Connie bid £500 for Michael. Michael was under the impression that Connie wanted him, but later found out her bid was actually a favour to a smitten Donna.
405	38	"New Lands, New Beginnings"	Fraser MacDonald	Tony McHale	23 June 2008	5.06
Joseph and Linden go to South Africa to save Faye. Is the information they are given too much too handle?
406	39	"Change of Heart"	Daikin Marsh	David Lawrence	1 July 2008	5.04
Linden's day starts bad when he discovers his late wife's grave vandalised and later at Holby gets worse when he doesn't get the essential equipment he ordered and then takes on a risky procedure which Maddie disagrees with causing her to be thrown out of the operation by Linden. The patient dies on the table causing Linden to wonder how it happened. Lady Byrne leaves abruptly for a world cruise causing Jayne to appoint Michael as her replacement. Michael sees this as a chance to get Connie to be the new medical advisor to the trust and suggests to Elliott he might want to take a holiday. Elliott sees this as an opportunity to wind up Jayne. Jac experiences breathing difficulties and is rushed to surgery where Joseph operates and stabilises her. Joseph sees a new side to Jac but because of their history is not sure what to make of her and her new self.
407	40	"Only Believe"	Daikin Marsh	David Lawrence	8 July 2008	5.61
Martin Kelly, a Clinical Risk Manager for Holby, is assigned to investigate Liam Harris's death. He advises Jayne to send Linden home because the case is gaining momentum in the press. Jayne asks Ric to intercede with Kelly and give Linden a positive outlook as it was her that appointed . An anxious Sam has his final scan and later reveals to Maria that is all clear and gets Maria's hopes up that Sam has feelings for her but is later disappointed when she finds out that Sam doesn't return her feelings. Jayne tells Connie and Ric that the Director of Surgery is on offer and it is a two-horse race. Ric decides not to apply but unknown to him Abra applies online for him. Jayne finds out that Linden didn't go home as she told him to do and instead operated so she suspends him immediately and has him escorted out of the building. Daisha and Mark win a horse bet. Linden returns to AAU when he gets a page and gets involved in the treatment of a Chinese couple's impending baby. Ric worries that Abra is starting to unravel.
408	41	"Crossing Borders"	Ian Jackson	Chris Murray	15 July 2008	4.88
Even though he was suspended, Linden stayed at Holby trying to help a North Korean asylum seeker, Mrs Tan, who was pregnant with conjoined twins. Faye returned to Holby from South Africa but her secret engagement was revealed by Jac to the staff which doesn't please Faye. Joseph's sister Sophie visited and revealed a family party planned for that evening. Maddy grew suspicious about the circumstances surrounding Liam Harris' death and after attending theatre with Michael she noticed that the anesthetist wasn't paying attention and knew he also assisted at Liam's op. Maddy wondered if he inadvertently caused Liam's death and set out to prove it. Maddy confronted Jamie about his carelessness but he shrugged it off, claiming not to make mistakes. Later, Maddy secretly entered the morgue and took a blood sample from Liam Harris' body. Elsewhere, Joseph made it up to Faye by canceling the party so they could spend the evening alone.
409	42	"On The Brink"	Ian Jackson	David Lawrence	22 July 2008	4.76
Jayne told Ric and Connie that the Board had forced her to open up the job of Director of Surgery, both later found out that Elliott and Michael were also in the running. Maddy got the lab results back on Liam Harris via Sam but nothing showed up so she enlists Sam to get better samples. Abra started to crack up after abandoning an operation on a road traffic accident victim. The Home Office visit with Ric over Mrs Tan with Michael helping Ric with a forged test in order to keep Mrs Tan in Keller. Connie performed a landmark operation live over the Internet, but was disappointed that Jayne forgot to attend. At the bar, Connie was deflated when Jayne confirmed there was tough competition for the job. A handsome stranger offered to buy Connie a drink and they started flirting.
410	43	"You Do It To Yourself"	Daikin Marsh	Dana Fainaru	29 July 2008	4.82
Ric warned Abra that his behaviour was getting worse and then Michael tells him to not ruin Ric's chances of Director of Surgery. Connie woke alone in a hotel suite but with a smile on her face. Lola criticized Faye over her treatment of an elderly patient who refused to leave Holby. Maddy's secret tests revealed the real reason Liam Harris died which she took to Jayne, but Jayne is less than impressed. Abra's mind began to play tricks on him while dealing with a patient and later in theater he experienced flashbacks from the Congo whilst the patient's condition deteriorated. Ric ordered Abra to step back but, in his confused state, Abra lashed out and cut Ric's arm with a scalpel.
411	44	"Eighteen and a Half"	Daikin Marsh	Graham Mitchell	5 August 2008	5.15
Daisha discovers she is pregnant and has cystitis as well. Abra continues his decline and eventually signs himself into a psychiatric ward. Mrs Tan gives birth to her conjoined twins after an enforced battle by Linden to get Holby Board to keep them in Holby and not transfer them to another hospital.: Departure of Percy 'Abra' Durant*
412	45	"The Devil and the Deep Blue Sea"	Christopher King	Debbie O'Malley	12 August 2008	5.12
Daisha's morning sickness is making her daily duties difficult and when Mark confronts her, thinking she's been out drinking the night before, she has to tell him she's pregnant. Daisha says she wants a termination but when she learns that she's 25 weeks pregnant, she realises this is not a legal option. But Daisha is determined not to have the child and is intent on seeking illegal alternatives – much to Mark's disbelief. The Tan family have become a huge distraction for Linden and when Professor Adler arrives to oversee the move of the conjoined twins to London, Linden argues that they should stay at Holby with their parents. He seeks help from Ric and Connie, and Connie agrees to try to persuade Adler to perform the operation to separate the twins at Holby. But Jayne is not happy about Linden's meddling – the procedure costs for the operation are something Holby could not afford. Faye treats an asthma attack patient who makes her rethink her relationship with Joseph. She later talks to him about her worries of a future together without children of their own but Joseph reminds her that, if they do get married, Archie will become his son.
413	46	"Hope, Faith & Charity"	Christopher King	Justin Young	26 August 2008	4.74
Michael's friend, Minister Randall, donated money towards the Tans but in return he wanted them for publicity for this church in the US. Daisha went to the Clinic after Mark borrowed money from Elliott, but she couldn't go through with the operation. Connie did a deal with Ric and withdrew from the Director of Surgery job as did Elliott. Michael interviewed for the job but Jayne told him that he wouldn't get it because of an altercation he had in the Holby car park when he first started. As Ric waited for his interview Michael took him to the morgue and informed him that his son Leo is dead.
414	47	"To Govern a Kingdom"	James Larkin	Jake Riddell	2 September 2008	4.83
Ric attends his son's Leo funeral late and his ex-wife Amber (and Leo's mother) makes her feelings very clear to him. Ric told Amber that Leo's death was not his fault as it was heroin that killed him. Ric is offered the job of Director of Surgery but turns it down after coming back from the funeral and also handed in his resignation. Jac meddles in Joseph & Faye's wedding plans. At first Joseph doesn't understand why she wants a small, quiet wedding until she explains that she has to think of Archie too. After talking with Mr. Tan Ric withdrew his resignation with the aim of revamping Keller. He told Jayne to accept Randal's donation for the twins, but filter it through the Holby Nightcare Charity.
415	48	"Whatever It Takes"	James Larkin	Phillip Gawthorne	9 September 2008	5.28
The Board called an urgent crisis meeting on the Tans. As the meeting progressed it got worse for Jayne and Linden leading Jayne to enlist Connie to come to her aid. Meanwhile, Joseph told Jac to leave Faye alone and sensing a mystery Jac left Holby to go to Greenfields where she conned her way into meeting Faye's son Archie. On her arrival back in Holby she taunted both Joseph & Faye with her discovery - a fact which Faye didn't take kindly to. Elsewhere, Donna's attempt to become a scrub nurse hit the skids when she mistakenly told a patient he might have cancer. However, she later impressed Elliot when diagnosing the patient's condition correctly. Maria, meanwhile, continued to email her mystery admirer Aaron.
416	49	"Separate Lives"	Carl Hindmarch	Martin Jameson	16 September 2008	5.14
Ric was forced to make a consultant redundant and Lola was his only option. Although initially vexed, Lola turned the situation to her advantage. She set up a lucrative new job in a private clinic whilst also getting a really good redundancy package. Kyla and Daisha vied for the vacant Sister position. But after finding out that Daisha was pregnant she let Daisha have the post. Maria continued to receive emails from Aaron despite getting cynical comments from Maddy and Donna. Aaron redeems himself later when he sent a bunch of flowers to Maria. Elsewhere, Linden finds out from a news report that the Tans have lost their case against deportation. Later Connie tells him that one of the twins had aortic stenosis and needed to be separated. Now Linden must decide if he should go against his own religious convictions and advise the Tans to move forward with the separation or let fate decide.
417	50	"Leave it to God"	Carl Hindmarch	David Lawrence	23 September 2008	5.30
In the wake of Lola's departure Sam is assigned to cover post-op care. Initially over-confident, he soon found that things weren't as easy as he'd thought and he upset Michael, Connie and Ric along the way. He managed to salvage his credibility by arranging a successful meeting about the Tans twins' separation but it meant telling Linden that he couldn't be part of the separation because he was too close to the Tans. Encouraged by Mark and Donna, Daisha contacted her ex-boyfriend Paul to tell him about the baby. After initial reluctance, Paul attended a scan with Daisha and won over, he then told a thrilled Daisha he'd recognise his responsibilities and wanted to be involved. But then Mark told Paul about what bringing up a baby would be like so Paul changed his mind and told Daisha that he would support the baby but wouldn't be with her. Elsewhere, Kyla, was chatted up by a patient on AAU as Maddy secretly hid a letter that arrived for Kyla from Abra. Meanwhile, Connie's relationship with her mystery man got steamy as they had a secret rendezvous in a hotel room.
418	51	"No Breaks on the Midnight Express, Part I"	Farren Blackburn	Tony McHale	29 September 2008	5.43
Jayne comes under fire from the Board for accepting Randall's donation, as he is charged with child molestation in the U.S. But Jayne takes a stand and moves that the surgery takes place straight away. Jayne urges the Board to stop the operation themselves but she won't do it. Linden urges her to tell the press that they accepted the donation because no-one else would fund it. As Connie and Elliott proceed with the surgery they discover a complication, Connie corrects and then hands over to Ric and Michael. They, in turn, successfully operate on a ureter problem with the stronger twin. Meanwhile, Kyla's patient Dorian continues to pursue her. Egged on by Maddie, Donna and Maria Kyla confesses to him that she's an alcoholic, paving the way for a possible relationship as Maddie continues to hide Abra's letters for Kyla. Elsewhere, a jealous Jac maliciously told Ric about Faye's disabled son so that she wouldn't be in theatre with Joseph. However Connie, on Faye's side, reprimanded Jac in no uncertain terms.
419	52	"No Breaks on the Midnight Express, Part II"	Farren Blackburn	Tony McHale	1 October 2008	5.29
Ric and Michael went against Professor Adler's decision and gambled on how to split the twins bowels so to give both twins the best chance of survival. The twins come through but a complication towards the end brought Connie and Elliott back in to save the day. Connie and John declared their love for one another and agreed to keep on seeing each other. Kyla began to fall for her patient, Dorian, but Mark found his lost patient notes and found that he is a diagnosed schizophrenic. Kyla told him she didn't want to see him again and later found the letters that Maddie had hidden from Abra. Maria had a chance meeting with a handsome pediatric surgeon on the separation op. He asked her out and she turned him down initially because of Aaron, her email romancer. Later on, he revealed himself to be Aaron and Maria was delighted and agreed to go out with him. Jayne's job continued to be in jeopardy until she received a call from the Strategic Health Authority, who agreed to fund the separation op which meant that she could return the donation to Randal. On top of that the Immigration Board gave the Tans asylum and several of the Board were forced to resign much to Jayne's delight.
420	53	"Mad World"	Rob Evans	Joe Ainsworth	14 October 2008	5.60
Lola begins her new job as House Medical Officer at a private psychiatric clinic but is stunned to see a familiar face working in the grounds - Abra. He tells her his estranged mother Elizabeth brought him there for therapy. Lola told Kyla who came to see Abra. After an incident with a patient takes place it gets Lola and Abra thinking and they both decide to go back to Ghana in Africa. Meanwhile, Ric receives a letter from the council ordering him to clear out his dead son Leo's flat. Whilst there he encounters Tom O'Dowd who claims to be Leo's best friend. Tom tells Ric stories about Leo and Ric finds out a new side to his son. However, he later finds Tom trying to find drugs belonging to Leo and throws him out of Leo's flat.: Guest Appearance of Adrian Edmondson as Percy 'Abra' Durant. Final Regular Appearance of Lola Griffin*
