= New Lands, New Beginnings =

- Holby City episode
- Episode no.: Series 10; Episode 38
- Directed by: Fraser Macdonald
- Written by: Tony McHale
- Cinematography by: Gavin Struthers
- Editing by: Michael Dawson; (senior editor); Darren Guthrie; (story editor); Benedict Boyd; (script editor)
- Original air date: 23 June 2008
- Running time: 60 minutes

Episode chronology
← Previous "Doctor's Dilemma"	Next → "Change of Heart"

"New Lands, New Beginnings" is the 38th episode of the tenth series of the UK medical drama Holby City. It was written by the programme's creator, Tony McHale, directed by Fraser Macdonald, and premiered on BBC Scotland on 23 June 2008.

== Production ==
Holby City is regularly filmed at the BBC Elstree Centre in Borehamwood, Hertfordshire. "New Lands, New Beginnings" was the last of an annual series of episodes to be filmed on location abroad. The programme had previously visited Paris in 2004, Ghana in 2005, Switzerland in 2006, and Dubai in 2007. Series producer Diana Kyle stated in November 2008 that due to major BBC budget cuts, the series would not be filming abroad again for the "foreseeable future".

The episode's central characters, Faye, Joseph and Linden, were three of the series' best-known at the time of broadcast according to Kris Green of the entertainment news website Digital Spy. The Stage's Mark Wright observed that Linden was still fairly new to the programme at the time; indeed, Pow had debuted in the role just five months previously, in January 2008.

== Reception ==
According to overnight ratings, the episode was watched by an average of 5.3 million viewers and attained a 26% audience share. Its final viewership was calculated at 5.06 million, down 530,000 on the previous episode, "Doctor's Dilemma", and 560,000 on the tenth series average of 5.62 million. It was the twelfth most-watched programme on BBC One in the week of broadcast; the fourth most-watched scripted show behind Doctor Who, EastEnders and its parent series Casualty.

Critical response to the episode was mixed. It was selected as recommended viewing by the Daily Record, Liverpool Daily Post, and Ceri Thomas of the Evening Standard, although Thomas' review highlighted the unsubtle showcasing of the foreign setting. He noted, "almost every shot features either glorious coastline or grimy townships, while the soundtrack is heavy with African drums. Sheesh! If they'd set it in France, would the Eiffel Tower be constantly in view while Charles Aznavour warbled away in the background? Probably..." Digital Spy's Green called the episode "action-packed". Jane Simon of the Daily Mirror commented on the implausibility of the plot: the way in which "The merest hint that the delectable Faye Morton might be in a spot of bother prompts two of Holby's top surgeons to drop everything in the middle of a shift and leap on the next plane to South Africa", and the "unlikely tales of dark, family-related woe" shared by Faye and Linden. On the events set in Holby, Wright wrote in The Stage, "is Connie still as fabulous as ever? Of course she is!"
