= Holby City series 9 =

Holby City
- Series 9
- No. of episodes: 52

Release
- Original network: BBC One
- Original release: 24 October 2006 – 9 October 2007

Series chronology
- ← Previous; Series 8 Next → Series 10

The ninth series of the British medical drama television series Holby City commenced airing in the United Kingdom on BBC One on 24 October 2006, and concluded on 9 October 2007.

== Cast ==
=== Main characters ===
- Rakie Ayola as Kyla Tyson
- Adam Best as Matt Parker (until episode 24)
- Paul Bradley as Elliot Hope
- Tom Chambers as Sam Strachan
- Sharon D. Clarke as Lola Griffin
- Ade Edmondson as Abra Durant (until episode 14, episodes 32–52)
- Paul Henshall as Dean West (until episode 24)
- Tina Hobley as Chrissie Williams (until episode 17, from episode 29)
- Jaye Jacobs as Donna Jackson
- Verona Joseph as Jess Griffin (until episode 29)
- Patsy Kensit as Faye Byrne (from episode 18)
- Nadine Lewington as Maddy Young (from episode 15)
- Rosie Marcel as Jac Naylor
- Sharon Maughan as Tricia Williams (until episode 6)
- Amanda Mealing as Connie Beauchamp
- Patricia Potter as Diane Lloyd (episodes 1–38)
- Robert Powell as Mark Williams
- Hugh Quarshie as Ric Griffin (until episode 4, from episode 22)
- Luke Roberts as Joseph Byrne
- Phoebe Thomas as Maria Kendall (from episode 7)
- Peter Wingfield as Dan Clifford (from episode 7)

=== Recurring and guest characters ===
- Stella Gonet as Jayne Grayson (from episode 39)
- Ginny Holder as Thandie Abebe-Griffin (episodes 22–43)
- Andrew Lewis as Paul Rose
- Alex Macqueen as Keith Greene
- Patrick Toomey as Christopher Sutherland (until episode 37)

== Episodes ==
No. overall	No. in series	Title	Directed by	Written by	Original release date	Viewers (millions)
316	1	"Before a Fall"	Jamie Annett	Jeff Dodds	24 October 2006	6.21
Diane Lloyd returns to help Lord Byrne oversee the team as they undertake a terrorist drill. Joseph Byrne takes an accidental overdose and is saved by Jac Naylor. Mark Williams persuades Diane to perform a risky operation on Tricia, and Abra comes clean to Ric about the pig's kidney transplant. Diane Lloyd returns
317	2	"Shot in the Dark"	Jamie Annett	Joe Ainsworth	31 October 2006	6.25
Diane, Abra and Ric operate successfully on Tricia after Mark attempts to manipulate the waiting list. Elliot and his son James speak with Dr Sang in the aftermath of Gina's death.
318	3	"Fly Me to the Moon"	Deborah Paige	Paul Coates	2 November 2006	5.29
Ric catches Abra trying to steal drugs from the hospital pharmacy. Elliot and Joseph look out for each other's well-being. Dean and Matt play Halloween pranks on Donna, who meets a psychic patient. Abra flirts with Kyla, who agrees to go on a breakfast date with him.
319	4	"Sins of the Father"	Deborah Paige	Gert Thomas	7 November 2006	6.82
Donna catches Matt kissing his psychiatric patient Nikki. Abra and Ric's kidney transplant patient, Pete Golding, returns to Holby as his body begins to reject the organ. His mother discovers the truth about the transplant and almost reports both surgeons to Sutherland, however changes her mind at the last minute. Ric announces he is leaving to take a sabbatical in Uganda. Ric Griffin departs
320	5	"One for My Baby"	A.J. Quinn	Joy Wilkinson	14 November 2006	6.69
Chrissie discovers that Tricia had kept the return of her cancer secret from her, and falls out with her mother. Matt tries and fails to break things off with Nikki, and Sam meets vulnerable heart transplant Jade, brought in by her pimp. On the way to the airport for their second honeymoon, Mark and Tricia are involved in a car crash.
321	6	"The Unforgiven"	A.J. Quinn	Stephanie Lloyd-Jones	21 November 2006	6.56
Diane operates on Tricia, who wakes briefly but soon deteriorates. Lola catches Matt and Nikki together and comes close to ending Matt's career as a doctor. Sam operates on Jade, while Diane reveals that Tricia is brain damaged, and Mark and Chrissie make the decision to turn off her ventilator. Tricia Williams dies
322	7	"It's Been a Long Day"	David Innes Edwards	Tony McHale	28 November 2006	6.49
Dan Clifford arrives and shows an interest in the kidney patient Pete Golding, worrying Abra. Maria is shocked to witness her first death, and Connie reveals to Sam that she is pregnant. Martha and Joseph take Elliot home for the first time since Gina's death. Dan Clifford and Maria Kendall arrive
323	8	"The Bitterest Pill"	David Innes Edwards	Tony McHale	5 December 2006	6.45
Dan discovers that the kidney transplant is not the only illegal dealing Abra is involved in, suspecting him of sending HIV medication abroad. The staff attend Tricia's funeral, where Connie reveals to Sam he is the father of her baby.
324	9	"Crossing the Line"	Neil Adams	Rachel Flowerday & Debbie O'Malley	14 December 2006	6.31
Mark is found guilty of drink driving, and blames himself for Tricia's death. Joseph and Jac kiss for the first time. Kyla discovers used HIV medication in Abra's desk drawer and assumes he is HIV positive. When he fails to provide adequate explanation, she breaks up with him. Martha announces she is dropping out of uni to go into medicine, and Elliot finds her a Healthcare Assistant job on Darwin.
325	10	"The Good Fight"	Neil Adams	Jenny Lecoat	19 December 2006	5.83
Lola reluctantly allows her foster daughter Leanne to go home with her father. Matt attempts and fails to break up with Nikki once again. Jac agrees to spend Christmas with Joseph's family, while Mark, Elliot, James and Martha scatter Gina's ashes in the peace garden.
326	11	"The Very Thought of You"	Robert Del Maestro	Matthew Evans	28 December 2006	6.61
Lola and Dan discover Leanne's father Steve collapsed following an overdose. Although they try to save him, he dies, and social worker Frankie Weston tells Lola she may apply for full custody of Leanne. Trying to keep the baby's best interests in mind, Lola declines. Elsewhere, Jac warns Martha off of pursuing Joseph, and Kyla learns the truth about Abra's stockpiling of HIV drugs. He arranges a romantic snow scene outside the hospital, and they dance and make up.
327	12	"I Know Thee Not"	Robert Del Maestro	Pete Hambly	2 January 2007	6.96
Connie refuses to allow Sam to attend her twelve-week scan after witnessing him giving a one night stand the cold shoulder in the car park, but later softens and hands him a scan photo. Mark's first day as a Nursing Consultant gets off to a bad start.
328	13	"The Games People Play"	Christopher King	Chris Murray	4 January 2007	6.58
Jac manipulates events so that Elliot catches Joseph and Martha kissing. Abra only narrowly avoids being caught stealing drugs by Dan and Sutherland. Donna and Maria run a sweepstake for staff members to guess the paternity of Connie's baby.
329	14	"The End of the World as We Know It"	Christopher King	Len Collin & Jack Kelsey	9 January 2007	6.84
Connie falls on the wards, causing a partial placental abruption and raising fears for the safety of her baby. Martha attempts to warn Joseph off Jac, but Jac wins him round as they sleep together for the first time in an on-call room. Dan finally catches Abra out, but gives him the chance to leave the country and continue working as a doctor, on the condition he tell no one of his leaving. Kyla is heartbroken to discover he has fled without saying goodbye.
330	15	"Face Value"	Fraser MacDonald	Chris Boiling	16 January 2007	6.81
New SHO Maddy Young reveals herself to be an old friend of Dan's. Jac and Diane compete to fill the Consultant's post left open by Abra's departure. Diane emerges the victor, and Jac uses her disappointment to win her way onto the surgical team Lord Byrne is preparing to take to Dubai. Elsewhere, Sam disappoints Chrissie by revealing he sees her as just a friend, and Connie feels suffocated by his concern for their unborn baby. Maddy Young arrives
331	16	"Feast or Famine"	Fraser MacDonald	Joe Ainsworth	23 January 2007	6.86
Diane is eager to impress on her first day as a Consultant. Kyla is frustrated when Harvey dumps Max on her at work, however softens towards him when Max is admitted with food poisoning. Suffering from the same, Connie is sick, and until they realise that it is food poisoning. Connie fears for her unborn baby but is reassured by Elliot who realises it is food poisoning. Chrissie is thrown from her pursuit of Sam when Jade arrives at the hospital wanting to stay with him.
332	17	"Into the Dark"	Indra Bhose	Andrew Holden	30 January 2007	7.00
Faye Morton arrives at Holby wanting Jac and Joseph to make good on their promise to find her nursing work. Dan irritates Connie by attempting to steal her theatre space, and is accused of sexual harassment by a patient. Donna, Maddy and Dean enter a scratch card syndicate, but when Donna wins £20,000 she has no intention of sharing her winnings. Chrissie is shocked to discover Jade in Sam's bed, and decides to leave Holby for a while.
333	18	"Blood Ties"	Indra Bhose	Dana Fainaru	6 February 2007	6.42
Sam's reputation is in ruins following Chrissie's accusation of him sleeping with underage prostitutes. Donna's massive spendings following her lottery win make her increasingly unpopular amongst her friends. Matt realises Nikki has been telling the truth all along about her father.
334	19	"I Feel Pretty"	Deborah Paige	Debbie O'Malley	13 February 2007	6.84
Diane and Jac clash when Diane works her first night shift as a Consultant. Jac attempts to show Diane up, but her plan backfires when she is attacked by a patient. Kyla is forced to bring Max into work again, annoying Lola. Sam attempts to arrange for Jade to stay with his parents, but she absconds before he can, afraid of Social Services being contacted.
335	20	"Can't Buy Me Love"	Deborah Paige	Dan Sefton	20 February 2007	5.92
Donna is planning on travelling to Australia with the last of her winnings, but is thwarted when a patient steals her money and it is claimed by a local charity, coupled with her missing her flight. Elliot proves to Martha that he can cope on his own, so she agrees to go back to university. Kyla and Harvey have a furious row about Max, resulting in him punching her and leaving her needing stitches.
336	21	"The Borders of Sleep"	Fraser MacDonald	Nick Warburton	6 March 2007	5.63
Jac decides to break up with Joseph, however changes her mind when Lord Byrne tells her how pleased he is with their relationship. Harvey attacks an elderly patient however Kyla lies and claims she saw nothing, agreeing to take him back. Faye and Sam go for a drink, but she rejects his advances and Sam instead goes home with Maddy.
337	22	"Stargazer"	Fraser MacDonald	Sam Wheats	20 March 2007	6.16
Faye suggests to Jac that she stop playing Joseph off against his father. Diane bad mouths Ric to Dan, unaware that Ric has returned and is listening to their conversation. Later, Ric introduces her to his new fiance, Thandie Abebe. Mark agrees to help Faye hide her identity from an interested party when she claims her husband James is looking for her and used to abuse her. However, Faye is later taken away by police who wish to question her about his suspicious death. Ric Griffin returns. Thandie Abebe arrives
338	23	"What Lies Beneath"	A.J. Quinn	Tony McHale	27 March 2007	6.32
Shot partly on location in Dubai, this episode is half told through flashbacks of Faye, Joseph and Jac's time there. It is revealed that Jac and Joseph performed an operation they were not qualified for, whilst pretending to be Consultants. Faye's husband James is seen to attack her, followed by Faye calmly stepping over his dead body at the bottom of a staircase, leaving Dubai for Holby. Back in Holby, Maddy's escaped prisoner father is secretly admitted and treated by Dan, who helps Maddy hide his whereabouts from the police.
339	24	"Bedlam"	Ian Jackson	Johanne McAndrew & Elliot Hope	28 March 2007	3.79
Thandie starts work on AAU and makes a poor first impression on Lola. Nikki attempts suicide after Matt refuses to move in with her, and the whole affair is finally revealed. Matt is suspended, while Dean is approached by Dr Sang to take a job on the psychiatric ward. Faye reveals to Joseph and Jac that James is dead, and Joseph agrees to support her. Matt Parker and Dean West depart
340	25	"Is There Something I Should Know?"	Ian Jackson	Andrea Earl & Matthew Evans	3 April 2007	5.71
Joseph jumps to the wrong conclusion when Jac turns up at work with Sam after a night out. Faye walks in on Kyla as she is changing, discovering extensive bruising on her back. Harvey turns up after his disciplinary hearing and pleads with Kyla to give him one last chance, announcing that he has enrolled in anger management classes. Diane clashes with Thandie, and Kyla is taken out by Harvey as she was about to open up to Faye.
341	26	"Paranoid Android"	Jamie Annett	Paul Coates	10 April 2007	5.14
An increasingly stressed Lola lashes out at Thandie, but is slowly turning her whole team against her. Jac manipulates her way onto a prestigious tele-surgery team, and later sleeps with Lord Byrne. Kyla attempts to cut Harvey out of her life after he once more attacks her at work, but agrees to give him one final chance when seeing how upset this makes Max.
342	27	"For Whom the Bell Tolls"	Jamie Annett	Jeff Dodds	17 April 2007	6.03
Thandie discovers her reference from Ethiopia is uncomplimentary and persuades Ric to write her a new one. Lord Byrne asks Jac to keep their liaison quite, although Diane begins to suspect something has happened between them. Jade turns up at Holby again and reveals to Sam she is pregnant. After she refuses a termination, he ropes in Maddy and takes Jade back to his flat.
343	28	"Leap of Faith"	Farren Blackburn	Mark Cairns	24 April 2007	5.15
Lola lashes out at a patient's relative, and Mark reports her to Sutherland, who fires her. However, before she can leave, Lola suffers a heart attack. Jade threatens to kill herself if she can't be with Sam, and he agrees to take her home again, but later is taken away by police for the murder of a client. Faye questions Thandie's judgement and is reported by Ric, however Dan is impressed with her and promotes her to Ward Sister.
344	29	"Deep Dark Truthful Mirror"	Farren Blackburn	Gert Thomas	1 May 2007	5.10
Connie goes into premature labour as she operates on Lola, however keeps quiet until she has finished the operation. She gives birth to a premature daughter named Grace, but does not allow Sam to attend the birth. Harvey accuses Kyla of cheating on him when he finds lingerie in their flat, and the pair row on the hospital roof. Witness by Max, Harvey falls to his death.
345	30	"After the Fall"	Jim Loach	Chris Murray	10 May 2007	5.61
Lord Byrne is furious to discover that Jac and Joseph have not broken up as he had believed, but Jac talks him round. Connie throws herself back into work to Elliot and Sam's disapproval, and despite Dan's best efforts, Harvey dies in theatre. Max blames Kyla for his father's death and she lashes out at him. Later, she is arrested for assault and Max is taken into care.
346	31	"Trust"	Jim Loach	Martin Jameson	17 May 2007	4.81
Dan suggests to Thandie that she take a job on AAU, revealing he has been cataloguing her mistakes and no longer wants her on his team. Kyla is allowed to keep Max, but he refuses to stay in her care and is taken back into foster care. Connie is told her daughter is brain dead and agrees to turn off her ventilator, inviting Elliot to be present, but neglecting to inform Sam. After a tip off by Chrissie, Sam arrives just in time, and is delighted when Grace begins to breathe on her own.
347	32	"The Human Jungle"	Edward Bennett	Gert Thomas	24 May 2007	5.16
Lord Byrne encourages Jac to take a job in Edinburgh in an attempt to split her up with Joseph, however later feels guilty and reveals their affair to his son. Abra arrives back in Holby, hired by Sutherland to turn around AAU, but inadvertently arrives at Kyla's flat in the middle of Harvey's wake. Sam proves his paternity of Grace and irritates Connie by informing her he will fight for custody of his daughter.
348	33	"An Affair to Forget"	Edward Bennett	Mark Cairns	31 May 2007	4.99
Joseph invites Lady Byrne to the hospital to show his father what he is missing, and tells Jac he is willing to resume their relationship. However, Jac and Lord Byrne later leave to spend the night together. Ric tells Diane to stop taking on too much work, and Donna plays matchmaker and sets up Sam and Faye.
349	34	"Another Country"	Sarah O'Gorman	Martin Jameson	7 June 2007	4.99
Abra attempts to persuade Kyla to take him back, despite her initial annoyance with him, and later confesses his love for her as she breaks down after a hard day. Diane is given a hard time by a hospital inspector and does not receive any support from Ric, who suggests she consider a career change. Thandie makes things worse by asking her to be a bridesmaid at her wedding to Ric.
350	35	"Close Relations"	Sarah O'Gorman	Sasha Hails	14 June 2007	4.94
Diane hands in her resignation to Connie, but is talked into taking a leave of absence by Elliot, who offers her his wife's car and their country cottage to retreat to. Lady Byrne confronts Connie, led to believe by Jac that she is the woman having an affair with her husband, however quickly realises the truth. Chrissie reveals to Faye that she knows about her relationship with Sam, causing Faye to cool things off, afraid of being gossiped about. Elliot later receives a phone call informing him Diane has been killed in a car crash. Diane Lloyd dies
351	36	"Something's Gotta Give"	Rob Evans	Matthew Evans	21 June 2007	5.67
Ric is shocked to learn of Diane's death. When the train driver who hit her is admitted as a patient, against Thandie's urgings, he operates on him drunk. Abra and Lola clash over the running of AAU. Thandie accuses Ric of being in love with Diane, and breaks off their engagement.
352	37	"Countdown"	Rob Evans	Chris Murray	28 June 2007	5.07
Chrissie and Mark lead the nurses in a work to rule day after Sutherland's refusal to spend money on agency staff. Connie later calls for a vote of no confidence in him. Thandie accuses Elliot of racism when Ric refuses to take her back, and Dan tricks Jac into upsetting Ric by questioning Diane's judgement.
353	38	"Past Imperfect"	Fraser MacDonald	Joe Ainsworth	3 July 2007	6.01
The staff attend Diane's funeral, where Ric announces much to her parents' dismay that he believes Diane killed herself. He later agrees to take Thandie back. Connie visits her estranged father in Peckham, and introduces him to his granddaughter. She convinces him to have an operation he needs, and later agrees to allow Sam more access to Grace. Last appearance of Diane Lloyd
354	39	"Under the Radar"	Indra Bhose	Andrew Holden	10 July 2007	5.63
New CEO Jayne Grayson makes herself instantly unpopular by delivering news of Thandie's racism charge against Elliot. Elliot is distracted by the appearance of his son James, still haunted by his mother's death. James later goes missing, causing Elliot further distress. Dan's sister-in-law Louise arrives and reveals she is pregnant, asking Dan to help her have a secret abortion. Abra upsets Kyla by announcing the only reason he returns to Holby was in the hope of performing charity night ops, and later asks her to move in with him to make up. Jayne Grayson arrives
355	40	"The Long and Winding Road"	Indra Bhose	Jeff Dodds	17 July 2007	5.59
Elliot is told he must take a racial awareness course. Dan persuades his brother Alex to back off when Louise reveals she has ended their relationship because he refuses to give her any space. Chrissie is consoled by Sam when her boyfriend Anton dumps her following the death of his father.
356	41	"The Q Word"	Fraser MacDonald	Dan Sefton	24 July 2007	5.79
Lord Byrne filed for divorce much to Joseph's upset, but later collapsed, requiring surgery. Joseph operated on him at his father's request. Elliot was called away before his racial awareness course to identify a body. Maddy inadvertently took the course in his place, and although it transpired the body was not James, both were suspended when the switch was discovered. Jayne spent the day on AAU shadowing Abra.
357	42	"Temporary Insanity"	Fraser MacDonald	Graham Mitchell	31 July 2007	5.57
Before having chance to properly reconcile with his son, Lord Byrne passes away, leaving Joseph devastated. Jac is turned down by Ric for promotion. Abra's night operations are turned down by Jayne, and he begins to clear his desk, but is talked into trying again by Kyla.
358	43	"Bad Reputation"	Christopher King	Joe Ainsworth	7 August 2007	5.42
Jac turns up at Lord Byrne's funeral and later taunts Joseph, provoking him into slapping her. Ric marries Thandie, however is stunned when Connie later uncovers Thandie's lack of medical training. He forces her to revoke her racism charge against Elliot and informs her he is taking her back to Africa. Mark and Donna take cocaine, and Abra makes a drunken proposal to Kyla, but pretends to have been joking when she is unreceptive. Thandie Abebe-Griffin departs
359	44	"Damned If You Do"	Christopher King	Daisy Coulam	14 August 2007	5.72
Ric returns from his honeymoon without Thandie, claiming her brother has been killed in a car crash and she has stayed behind in Ethiopia for a few weeks. Jayne again turns down Abra's renewed plans for night operations, but against Kyla's insistence, he performs an illegal operation on a Ghanaian child anyway. She tries to terminate their relationship, but takes him back as he tells Ric they will take no further illegal cases. Jac wins her way onto Louise's stent trial after discrediting Joseph's application by revealing her injuries from his attack.
360	45	"Old Wounds"	Ian Jackson	Mark Clompus	21 August 2007	5.81
Connie refuses to support Louise's stent trial after a spat with Dan. Dan brings Abra onside by offering him Keller theatre at night for his illegal operations, and later wins round Connie too. Kyla is distressed when a motherless baby reminds her of Max, and is accused of sleeping on the job by Elliot. Mark buys cocaine from a drugs rep.
361	46	"Guilt by Association"	Ian Jackson	Debbie O'Malley	28 August 2007	5.66
Lola and Kyla deal with the victim of a sexual assault, while Lola attempts to teach Donna a lesson in nursing. Joseph discovers Sam is cheating on Faye with Chrissie and insists he break it off with Faye. Elsewhere, Jac covers for Maddy when she makes a poor judgment call after her twin is admitted with an abscess.
362	47	"Friends Reunited"	Rob Evans	Martin Jameson	4 September 2007	5.74
Maddy's niece Sunny is admitted following a methadone overdose, and later dies from cardiac complications. Jac runs into an old school acquaintance on the wards, who humiliates her as revenge for her childhood bullying. A patient whose possible involvement in a rape case had been concealed by Lola and Kyla later attacks Jac outside the hospital, but she and Lola fight him off. Chrissie pushes Sam to break up with Faye, but he reconsiders when Faye covers up a serious clinical error he made, resulting in the death of a patient.
363	48	"Trial and Retribution"	Rob Evans	Martin Jameson	11 September 2007	5.99
Dan and Louise's stent trial goes wrong when the stents are compromised prior to use, and one of the first test patients loses her leg. Sharing a drink over the events of the day, the pair end up kissing. Lola pushes Jac to talk to the police about her attack, but she refuses, and her attacker walks free. Both Chrissie and Faye break it off with Sam.
364	49	"Lovers and Madmen"	Jamie Annett	Nick Warburton	18 September 2007	5.43
Louise and Dan agree to forget about their kiss, but discover they are being sued over the stent failure and are forced to spend the night shift together with Alex going over events. At the end of the night, they kiss again. Sam bets Maddy he can win back Chrissie, and lies to her that he finished with Faye for her. When Chrissie discovers his lie, she and Maria set him up and she finishes with him for good. Elliot's son James returns from Bangkok and Mark discovers he's developed a drug habit.
365	50	"My Aim is True"	Jamie Annett	Gert Thomas	25 September 2007	5.62
Louise and Dan wake up together, and struggle to tell Alex of their infidelity. Dan realises he cannot hurt his brother, and tells Louise they can't be together. James discovers Mark's cocaine habit. Lady Byrne presents Joseph and Jac with their inheritances from Lord Byrne. Jac receives a ring which belonged to Joseph's grandmother, and Joseph a cheque for £500,000. Faye supports Joseph through the day, and shows a discreet interest in his inheritance.
366	51	"Duty of Care: Part 1"	Sarah O'Gorman	Sebastian Baczkiewicz	2 October 2007	5.59
Ric and Abra treat a new charity patient, but Abra has reservations when the young man is accompanied by his father, Cecil. Kyla arrives at three hours late, worried about a meeting she and Abra have with Social Services about access to Max. She has been drinking, and continues to throughout her shift. Faye steals Jac's new ring, but Joseph is disproving and declines to go to breakfast with her. Abra's father tells Kyla that Abra will never stick around for her, and shocked to discover their relationship, Kyla slaps Abra when he emerges from theatre.
367	52	"Duty of Care: Part 2"	Sarah O'Gorman	Dana Fainaru	9 October 2007	5.71
Abra's father falls ill and requires immediate treatment, delaying the transfer of the charity patient. Forced to re-evaluate his opinion of his father, Abra ruins Kyla's chances of getting Max back from Social Services, and breaks up with her, deciding to leave Holby to carry on his father's work in Africa. Maddy's role in Sunny's death is questioned by police, and Dan blackmails Ric into corroborating her story. Later, Maddy and Dan kiss.
