= Q word =

Q word or variants may refer to:

- "The Q Word", an episode of The Rookie
- "The Q Word", an episode of Holby City series 9
- Qword, a 64 bits/8 bytes word in computer architecture

== See also ==
- Interrogative word, a function word used to ask a question
- Queer, an umbrella term for sexual and gender minorities
