= Maria Kendall =

- Holby City character
- Phoebe Thomas as Maria in 2007
- First appearance: 9x07, "It's Been A Long Day", 28 November 2006
- Last appearance: 12x34, "Time and Tide Part Two", 19 May 2010
- Created by: Tony McHale
- Portrayed by: Phoebe Thomas

In-universe information
- Occupation: Student nurse Staff nurse Ward sister
- Family: Alex Deacon (mother); Adrian Kendall (adoptive father); Leonie Kendall (adoptive mother)
- Significant other: Sam Strachan

Maria Kendall was a fictional character on the BBC television series Holby City, portrayed by actress Phoebe Thomas. The character first appeared on-screen on 28 November 2006 in the episode "It's Been A Long Day" – series 9, episode 7. Her role in the show was originally that of a naive and inexperienced student nurse, with a slightly naughty side and a penchant for spreading hospital gossip. She later held the position of staff nurse. The character last appeared on-screen on 19 May 2010 in the episode "Time and Tide: Part Two'" – series 12, episode 34.

Maria's surname is actually misspelt "Kendal" on her nameplate, as can be clearly seen in photographs which have been published in magazines such as Inside Soap.

== Creation ==
=== Background ===
Prior to the introduction of the character Maria, Holby City had lost three regular nursing characters over the course of Series 8 and the beginning of Series 9 – Staff Nurses Jess Griffin, Mickie Hendrie, and Tricia Williams. Despite this outflow of nursing staff, the only recurring nursing character introduced in the show during this period had been Acting Sister Kyla Tyson, in Series 8, Episode 17. The creation of the character Maria – deliberately introduced an episode after the death of Tricia Williams, helped redress this balance to some extent, while also adding to the cast a Student Nurse for the first time since Jess Griffin's career change in Series 4, Episode 50.

== Storylines ==
Maria arrived in Holby as a relatively inexperienced student nurse. From her entrance in the episode "It's Been A Long Day", she was visibly shaken by the experience of patients' deaths and also to be somewhat gullible in believing patients' stories. Maria made friends with Donna Jackson and Maddy Young and they were responsible for spreading the news of Connie Beauchamp's pregnancy around the hospital. She had a brief flirtation with Matt Parker for a bet but was disappointed to learn he already had a girlfriend.

On her first day as a qualified nurse, Maria was attacked by a psychotic patient and had to stab him with a pair of scissors to fend him off. She had to take two weeks' compassionate leave. Shortly after her return, Maria was promoted to Staff Nurse.

It had previously been revealed that Maria was adopted at the age of three, after she was found abandoned as a baby in a ladies' washroom at Kew Gardens. Even when she was old enough to do so, Maria never tried to trace her birth parents; as far as she was concerned, her adoptive parents were – and always would be – her mum and dad. However, fate took the decision out of Maria's hands in May 2008, when her biological mother, Alex Deacon, was admitted to Holby City Hospital. Although Maria did not tell Alex who she was, she did convince Alex to have a life-saving operation. Alex told Maria about the baby she abandoned.

In the episode "We Serve All Who Come To Us", it became clear Maria had developed a crush on Sam Strachan. However, the feeling was not mutual, so their relationship did not develop past friendship for quite some time. Sam changed his mind about his feelings for Maria in December 2008. Unfortunately Sam's newly arrived long-lost son, Kieron Patel a talented violinist, also developed feelings for Maria. While she liked him, she preferred Sam. Not wanting to come between them, she stayed in Holby when they left for New York City.

In the episode "Maria's Christmas Carol", it was revealed that Maria was born on 15 October 1987, the day before the Great Storm, when the Ghost of Christmas Past showed her the events surrounding her birth.

The Ghost of Christmas Present showed a patient dying because she forgot to meet him for Christmas lunch. This was to show her how important she is to other people.

The Ghost of Christmas Future showed her, Sam and Kieron three years from now. Maria and Sam were married, and living and working in a hospital in New York. Maria was also expecting a baby, but Kieron was devastated that Maria had married Sam. He was so hurt that Maria and Sam had lied to him about their relationship that he refused to play the violin again, smashing the instrument to pieces in front of her. When Maria told Kieron that she had only ever loved him as a son, he deliberately stepped out in front of a truck. Kieron was rushed into hospital, but died on the operating table before the eyes of his father and stepmother.

When Maria returned to the present day and arrived at the Christmas party at Holby City Hospital to which she had been preparing to go before the Ghosts of Christmas Past, Present and Future had shown up, she made her peace with Donna (with whom she had argued earlier in the day), telling her that she was the best mate she had ever had, and told Sam that she wouldn't be going to live in New York with him and Kieron – thus ensuring that the events of 2011 that she had seen would never happen.

In the episode "Just a Perfect Day", Maria goes into the ladies' toilet to find Maddy bleeding out on the floor, having been stabbed in the back by the evil Chantelle, a convict whom Maddy had treated. She does the resuscitation procedure on Maddy, but at the end of the episode it is shown that Maddy has actually died and Maria blames herself for her friend's death. In the following week's episode, "What will Survive of Us?", Maria struggles to come to terms with Maddy's death, blaming herself for not moving the OUT OF ORDER sign from outside the toilet which, if she had, Maddy would have been found sooner and probably still be alive now. Not even the news that Chantelle has been arrested is enough to reassure her. Maria is asked by Linden to write a speech for Maddy's memorial service, which she does, but she can't read it because she is too upset. Donna steps in and reads the speech on Maria's behalf.

In September 2009 Maria ended up being hit by a car outside the hospital. Following Maria's accident, Ric tried to save her life. A fracture was discovered in Maria's spine. When she woke up she had no feeling in the lower part of her body. Donna tried to lift Maria's spirits and tried to get her to make friends with another patient on the ward. Maria learns she could be paralysed for life and her only chance is an operation which could cost her everything. Ric and Henry Miller operate on Maria. Maria is determined to stay positive about her future.

Maria left Holby in May 2010 when she got a new job.

=== Departure ===
On 17 February 2010, it was announced on the official Holby City website that Phoebe Thomas had just shot her final scenes as Maria which will be on screen in May.

Phoebe Thomas as Maria on Children in Need

== In popular culture ==
The 17 November 2006 Children in Need charity telethon included a segment featuring the Holby City cast performing a version of Hung Up by Madonna. Although the character had not yet made her on-screen debut in the programme, Phoebe Thomas as Maria Kendall appeared in the sketch – as did fellow newcomers Peter Wingfield (Dan Clifford) and Nadine Lewington (Maddy Young) who also had yet to arrive in the show itself.
