= Donna Jackson =

Fictional character in Holby City

- Holby City and Casualty character
- Jaye Jacobs as Donna Jackson
- First appearance: "Baptism of Fire"; 16 March 2004 (Holby City); "Casualty@Holby City – Part One"; 26 December 2004 (Casualty)
- Last appearance: Episode 1102; 29 March 2022 (Holby City); "Too Much Too Young"; 16 September 2023 (Casualty)
- Created by: Mal Young
- Portrayed by: Jaye Jacobs
- Spinoff(s): Casualty@Holby City (2004, 2005)
- Duration: 2004–2011, 2017–2023

In-universe information
- Occupation: Clinical nurse manager; (prev. Bank nurse, Staff nurse, Senior staff nurse, Ward sister)
- Family: Shirley Jackson (grandmother); Derek Newman (father)
- Spouse: Jared Baptiste (ex-husband)
- Significant other: Kieran Callaghan
- Children: Mia Barron (adoptive); Amber Baptiste

Donna Jackson is a fictional character from BBC medical dramas Holby City and Casualty, played by actress Jaye Jacobs. Donna entered Holby City in its sixth series as a staff nurse, characterised as a wild-child with a chaotic personal life. During her tenure, she grew to take her work more seriously, becoming a ward sister and accepting more personal responsibilities by adopting her half-niece Mia (Jada Wallace-Mitchell). A tart with a heart character, Donna had many romantic liaisons with her colleagues, including a one-night stand with midwife Mickie Hendrie (Kelly Adams). She ultimately fell in love with agency nurse Kieran Callaghan (Barry Sloane), and departed to be with him after he was injured in Afghanistan as part of the Territorial Army.

Jacobs' casting was chronicled in the documentary Making It at Holby. She made appearances as Donna in both Holby City's sister show Casualty, and two crossover editions of the programmes, broadcast as Casualty@Holby City. After seven years, Jacobs resigned from Holby City in order to pursue new projects; Donna departs in the drama's thirteenth series. The character's reintroduction was announced in February 2017 and she returns in the nineteenth series. Jacobs was included in the final cast of Holby City when it concluded in 2022. She reprised the role a year later in Casualty for a five-month stint.

Donna's relationship with her terminally ill father Derek (Clarke Peters) attracted praise from critics. Her affair with married consultant Michael Spence (Hari Dhillon) proved less popular, with several critics opining that Donna deserved better treatment. She was named "Best Emerging Talent" at the 2005 Screen Nation Awards for her portrayal of Donna, and was nominated for two further awards while part of the series.

== Storylines ==
=== Holby City ===
Donna arrives at Holby City Hospital as a staff nurse on the general surgery ward, making a poor first impression by being disorganised and insolent. Mistakenly believing that living with her superior will ensure her an easy time at work, Donna invites herself to move in with nurse Lisa Fox (Luisa Bradshaw-White). The two have a strained relationship: within weeks, Donna is evicted for falling behind on her rent, and when she is later allowed to move back in, she lets bailiffs take Lisa's possessions after failing to keep up her own loan repayments. Forced to run a shift in charge of the hospital's Acute Assessment Unit as recompense, Donna struggles to manage and learns a new respect for Lisa. During this period, Donna has a friendship with midwife Mickie Hendrie (Kelly Adams). Mickie is questioning her sexuality, and the two have sex while drunk. Mickie is disappointed when Donna states that it was just a one-night stand, but they are able to reconcile their friendship. When the general surgery ward is downsized, Donna is forced to reapply for her job. Although she gives a good interview and impresses Lisa, other candidates have more experience, so she is unable to retain her position and has to work as a bank nurse.

Following a short-lived relationship with physiotherapist Justin Fuller (Ben Richards), Donna moves on to date hospital manager Bradley Hume (Scott Adkins). Their relationship is terminated by the discovery that Bradley has been running a pharmaceutical scam, resulting in the death of one of Donna's patients due to a morphine overdose. After entering into a scratchcard syndicate at work, Donna wins £20,000. She refuses to share her winnings with the others and resigns from her job, making plans to travel to Australia. On her last day, a patient with bi-polar disorder steals and re-distributes her money. Donna misses her flight, and is forced to remain in Holby. She goes on to begin an affair with consultant general surgeon Michael Spence (Hari Dhillon), despite the fact he is married. When Michael's wife Annalese (Anna-Louise Plowman) begins working at the hospital as a locum anaesthetist, she suspects that Michael has been unfaithful to her and confronts Donna, who confesses the affair and apologises profusely.

Donna is shocked when her estranged father Derek (Clarke Peters) is admitted to the hospital and diagnosed with cancer. He dies soon thereafter, and when dealing with his effects, Donna learns that he unknowingly fathered another daughter. Though her half-sister is recently deceased, Donna meets her half-niece Mia (Jada Wallace-Mitchell), who is being raised by her grandmother, Patti (Barbara Drennan). Within weeks, Patti also dies, and Donna decides to adopt Mia. She and her friend Maria (Phoebe Thomas) compete for a ward sister position on the general surgery ward. Although Maria is the successful applicant, she realises that Donna needs the job in order to support Mia, and withdraws her candidacy so Donna is appointed sister. Donna falls in love with agency nurse Kieran Callaghan (Barry Sloane), and is devastated when he is called to serve in Afghanistan with the Territorial Army (TA). Kieran asks her to marry him, but Donna refuses, terminating their relationship with the intention of giving Mia stability. When Kieran is injured by an improvised explosive device (IED), Donna reconsiders, supporting him through the amputation of his leg. Upon learning that he will be transferred to a rehabilitation unit in Liverpool, Donna resigns in order to move there with him.

=== Casualty ===
When a fuel tanker crashes into the hospital, Donna works alongside ED staff members to treat patients. A year later, Donna is involved in a car crash en route to the staff Christmas party. She and paramedic Paul "Woody" Joyner (Will Thorp) then inadvertently cause a tunnel to collapse while trying to rescue a trapped baby. Donna is seconded for a shift to the ED as they deal with the aftermath of a school shooting, which Donna finds a challenge.

== Development ==
=== Casting and characterisation ===
Jacobs was cast as Donna immediately after leaving drama school, and considers herself "completely blessed" for having won the role. She was cast alongside fellow series six newcomer Kelly Adams, as midwife Mickie Hendrie. A BBC documentary entitled Making It at Holby chronicled their casting process, which entailed seven weeks of auditions, including group workshops to allow the series producers to gauge candidates' personalities. Adams originally auditioned as Donna, however the casting directors felt that she would be better suited to Mickie, the quieter character, and "mild mannered" counterpart to Donna's "sassy staff nurse". She and Jacobs were paired together during a three-hour workshop, and the producers detected an "instant spark" between them, leading to their dual casting. Following her successful audition, Jacobs was mentored by actress Jan Pearson, who played ward sister Kath Fox.

Donna as she appeared in her first stint.

Jacobs characterised Donna as "a working class tart". Upon her arrival in the programme, Donna was said to be a recent college graduate. Lacking career ambition, she selected nursing as the most exciting role available to her, hoping to meet a wealthy surgeon. The BBC stated that, despite her lack of ambition, Donna was likely to succeed on her chosen career path due to her propensity to "land on her feet". On the series' official website, Donna was described as a party girl with a "wild-child reputation". Her negative characteristics included being easily led and materialistic, easily bored, and "outspoken, stubborn and lazy". The website also highlighted her determination to "live life to the full", her fun-loving and straight-talking nature, bravery, honesty and loyalty, and the fact that "her heart's in the right place."

"I've played Donna for six years, and she’s a part of me, but she's changed a lot. She used to be quite comical; she had the bumbling one-liners and she was quite physical – there was a lot of bumping into stuff and falling over, having naughty nookie in confined spaces. Now it's getting a bit more serious. She's adopted a child, her niece Mia, and now that she's a sister, she needs to be more responsible."

— Jacobs, on developments in Donna's characterisation.

Donna's costume initially involved short skirts, tight-fitting tops, multi-coloured hair extensions and a nose-stud. Jacobs, who affected a Bristolian accent for the role, commented that Donna had "no sense of what she should keep covered up." A size 12, Jacobs was not pressured to lose weight for the role, and considered Donna's figure "part of her loveable charm". In early episodes, the character was seen to partake in recreational drug use and arrive for work hungover. Jacobs described her as "everything that you secretly want to be, but can't get away with in normal society", calling her "very gregarious" and immune to maturing. The Guardian's Grace Dent deemed her "weak-willed" in a 2006 feature on television medics, and in 2008, the Daily Mirror's Jane Simon branded her unintelligent.

A 2006 review by Simon noted that Donna lacked dedication to her job, and was easily distracted by her love life. Following an April 2008 interview with Jacobs, the itv.com website for the entertainment show This Morning observed that despite Donna's "chaotic" personal life, she had grown more serious about her work. Ultimately, adopting her half-niece Mia forced Donna to grow up, focussing on her career by attaining promotion to ward sister and accepting the resultant responsibilities. Reflecting on Donna's development in January 2011, Jacobs observed that she had changed a great deal from her early days, when she was used as a comical character with "bumbling one-liners", into a serious, more responsible person.

When Donna returned in 2017, Jacobs billed her character as "flirty, brash and ballsy", while Simon Harper, the show's acting executive producer, described Donna as "sparky [and] irreverent". Jacobs told Jessica Ransom of What's on TV that although Donna has matured since her departure in 2011, she is "still just Donna Jackson". She summarised Donna as "such a floored, quirky, mental character." Jacobs confirmed that Donna continues to be flirtatious upon her return, because it is in her personality. Sarah Deen, writing for the Metro, branded the character a "flirty, feisty whirlwind" and described her as "ballsy and bubbly". Reflecting on Donna's character development between leaving and returning, Jacobs commented, "Before she was a girl in her 20s who was very focused on love and men, and now she has two children so her life is a lot more child-focused." She added that Donna tries to focus on her maturer lifestyle while maintaining the lifestyle she had when she was younger. Jacobs stated that Donna's costume reflected that and opined that her dress sense had "regressed" since her departure. A BBC Online contributor characterised Donna as "a sassy, fun-loving nurse and a breath of fresh air." They stated that Donna is able to voice her opinions because she speaks in a comical tone. The reporter added that Donna returned to the nursing profession "a little worldlier" than before.

=== Family ===
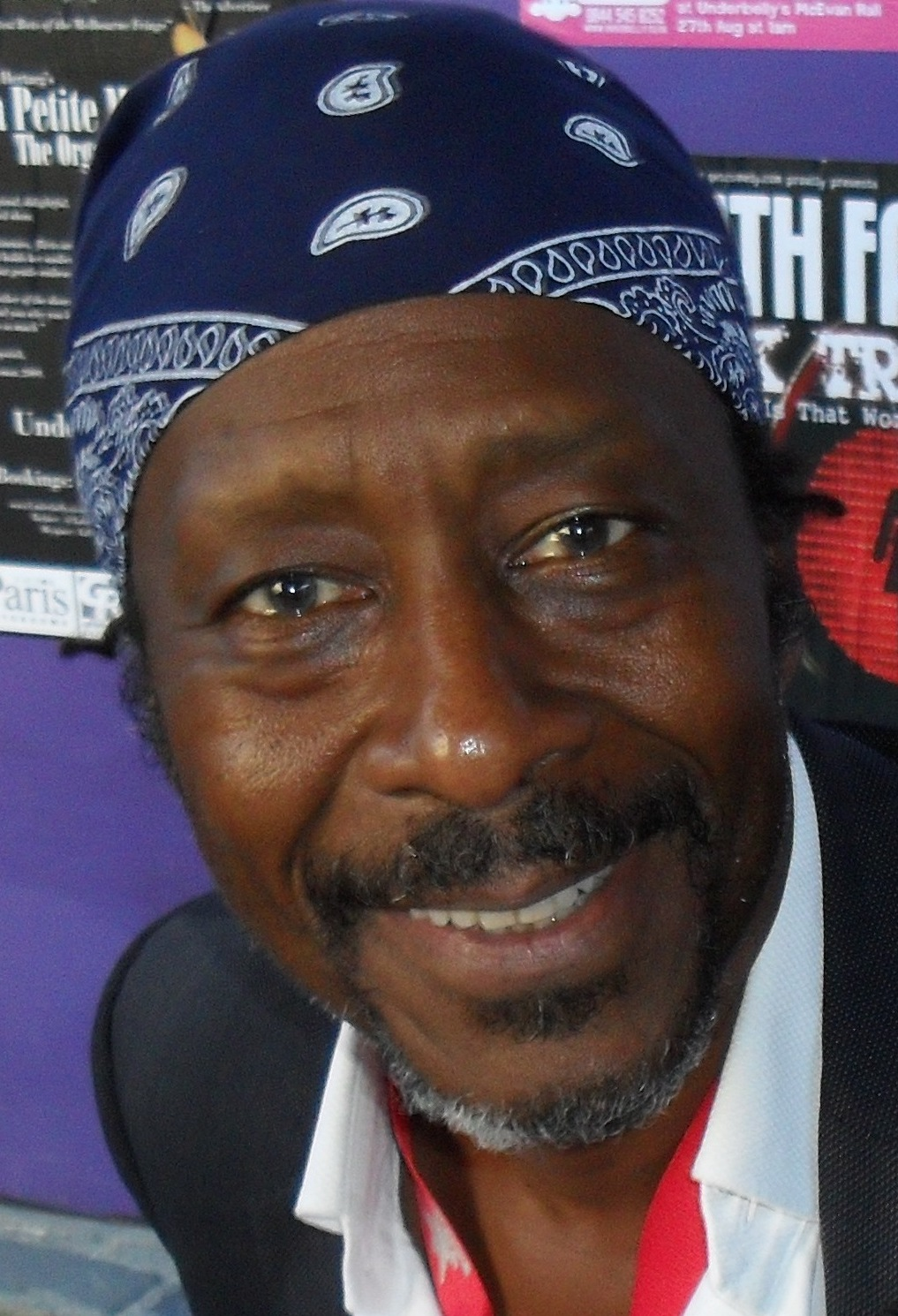
Clarke Peters played Donna's estranged father, Derek.

Donna was raised by her grandmother Shirley (Lynda Baron), who appears in the series eight episode "Bad Blood". Clarke Peters, star of American drama series The Wire, was cast as her estranged father in 2009. He appeared from 14 July to 11 August 2009, suffering from cancer of the splenic flexure, pancreas and abdominal wall. Jacobs was "thrilled" by Peters' casting, and reported that his first appearance rendered the programme's crew "star-struck" for the first time in her five years on the show. His appearance allowed Donna to confront her father over his abandonment of her as a child, and rendered her devastated upon learning that he had accepted his impending death. Peters assessed that his appearance had an "enormous impact" on Donna, explaining that his role allowed the audience to discover more about her life, as: "This is a way to get into these characters rather than just seeing them as one-dimensional characters, dealing with whatever happens at Holby." Producers Diana Kyle and Tony McHale intended the storyline to reveal a new side to Donna, depicting her attempting to cope, in contrast to the "smiling party girl" viewers were familiar with.

Following her father's death, Donna adopted her half-niece Mia. Discussing the development in the context of her 2010 Casualty appearance, Jacobs explained that it made her ED shift particularly stressful as "she now has little Mia to look after – if anything happens to Donna, Mia is completely on her own." She expanded that, "The stakes have really moved on for Donna over the last couple of years. She's had to accept some responsibility and it's not now just about which man she's going to sleep with next".

=== Relationships ===
Perennially "unlucky in love", Donna fits the tart with a heart stereotype. Her numerous romances during her tenure earned her the nickname "Nurse 'Action' Jackson". In 2004, she had a lesbian liaison with Mickie. The scene in which they kissed was edited to half its original length after being deemed too explicit for pre-watershed broadcast. Later that year, Jacobs stated that her ideal storyline would be for Donna to find a good man and gain a promotion, hoping she would find someone who would treat her well and help her give up her recreational drug habit. Her love interests included physiotherapist Justin Fuller, registrars Ed Keating (Rocky Marshall) and Mubbs Hussein (Ian Aspinall), manager Bradley Hume, senior house officer Sean Thompson (Chinna Wodu), and a love triangle with married consultant Michael Spence and his cardiothoracic colleague Connie Beauchamp (Amanda Mealing). Although Michael did not initially disclose to Donna that he was married, Jacobs stated that her character was aware of this "deep down", but was unfortunately unperturbed. He treated her badly, to the point that he would only have sex with her in a toilet stall; nonetheless Jacobs assessed that Donna was in love with him, believing him to be "the one" and different from her previous lovers, branding her deluded in this respect.

In a November 2007 article for the Daily Mirror, television critic Jim Shelley described Donna as a "nymphomaniac", though qualified his comment with the addendum "to be fair, sex addiction is a job requirement in Holby." His Mirror colleague Simon branded Donna supremely unsubtle in her pursuit of Michael, deeming her "unsinkable", and in a later piece for The Guardian, Shelley commented on Donna's proclivity for sleeping with senior staff members at inopportune moments, to the detriment of patient care. She was dubbed "man crazy" by Tina Miles of the Liverpool Echo, and "shameless" by the Mirror's Clare Raymond, who noted that she would "stop at nothing to snare a rich doctor".

Despite her numerous sex scenes, Donna did not have a genuinely romantic storyline until beginning a slow-burning romance with agency nurse Kieran Callaghan in late 2010. She initially disliked him, suspecting him of shirking his work duties, and at one point requested that he never return to her ward. Jacobs assessed that Donna was attracted to him, but would not allow herself to accept it at first, having had so many failed relationships with men ill-suited to her. They went on to begin a relationship, with Jacobs describing Kieran as "Donna's dream come true", and co-star Sloane deeming the two a "great match". Their relationship was impeded by Kieran's commitment to the TA and tour of duty in Afghanistan. Sloane felt that Kieran did not sufficiently explain the extent of his involvement with the TA, and assessed that Donna failed to understand his "soldier mentality", stating that their problems stemmed from a mutual stubbornness. Following Kieran's deployment, television magazine What's on TV noted a change in Donna's demeanour, observing that she had "soured" in contrast to her former "bubbly" friendliness. Kieran lost a leg in an IED explosion. In the aftermath, he and Donna reunited, before moving away together.

By the time she returns, Donna has become a footballer's wife after marrying footballer Jared Baptiste (Leon Lopez). Jacobs explained that Donna and Jared share a difficult relationship since Donna has "married into a lifestyle without realising it." Donna and Jared have a child, Amber Baptiste, which Jacobs thought was nice for Donna's character development. Donna considers Mia and Amber her top priority; on this, BBC Online contributor commented, "She would do anything to give her two girls all they need in life." Deen (Metro) observed that Donna has adopted "a new flashy lifestyle" since leaving Holby. Jacobs stated that despite her matured lifestyle, Donna would continue to be flirtatious. She also confirmed that Donna would not have a love interest, which she disliked. The actress hoped that Donna would be given a love interest after becoming reestablished within the series.

=== Crossover appearances ===
Donna has appeared in two editions of Casualty@Holby City—crossovers with Holby City's sister show Casualty, which is set in the hospital's emergency department (ED). In the first such crossover, originally broadcast in December 2004, Donna works alongside ED staff members when a fuel tanker crashes into the hospital. She reappears in the fourth edition of Casualty@Holby City, originally broadcast in December 2005, when she is involved in a car crash en route to the staff Christmas party. She and paramedic Paul "Woody" Joyner (Will Thorp) then inadvertently cause a tunnel to collapse while trying to rescue a trapped baby.

In 2010, Donna appeared in Casualty itself, for the launch of the show's twenty-fifth series. She was included in the episode at the request of its writer, Mark Cately. Casualty's series producer Oliver Kent deemed her "hilariously funny" and "one of Holby's best characters". During the episode, the ED staff work through the aftermath of a school shooting. Jacobs explained that Donna finds the shift difficult and is "really quite scared", as she is used to working with routine rather than emergency patients. In contrast to her typical disorganisation and laziness, Donna is forced to work hard and "put herself on the line" to keep up with the other staff members. Jacobs appears as Donna in a two-part crossover episode with Holby City's sister show, Casualty, originally broadcast in March 2019.

=== Departure ===
Jacobs departed from Holby City in 2011, wanting to "broaden [her] horizons" after seven years in the programme. The thirteenth series saw the departure of many regular cast members, and the arrival of a group of new ones, including Guy Henry, Laila Rouass, and Jimmy Akingbola. Jacobs deemed it "a new era with a new cast", one which she was not part of, and stated that the time felt right to leave. She had some input in her exit storyline, the focal point of which was Donna's relationship with Kieran, as they moved away to begin a new life together. Jacobs relayed feedback she had received from the general public with regards to how Donna should leave, and this was incorporated into her departure. The actress felt personal pressure to get Donna's last scenes right, wanting to give the best performance possible. She found the filming "overwhelming", explaining "it was incredibly emotional and intense, and it made it all very hard, and raw. [...] It wasn't until later that I realised I'd put myself under a hideously stressful situation, and that I should just be enjoying the experience." She stated: "I've absolutely loved playing Donna. I know that I'm going to look back very fondly on the time I had with her. I really got to know the character, and she had so many facets and was always fun to play."

=== Return ===
Jacobs reprised her role as Donna in 2017 and the character returns in Spring 2017. Donna claims that she is returning to the nursing profession as a "Good Samaritan", following her marriage to a footballer. However, it was teased that her reasons for returning may not be true. Jacobs missed the character and was pleased to return to the role, commenting, "Donna and I have unfinished business." Harper was glad that Jacobs decided to return and called her return "thrilling". Jacobs decided to reprise the role after assessing what she could bring to the character and realising how it could be "exciting" to Donna in this stage of her life. Jacobs signed a year-long contract after agreeing to return. She found it easy to relax back into the cast and found it comforting.

Donna returns following the death of F1 Jasmine Burrows (Lucinda Dryzek) when the hospital's mood is low. Deen (Metro) thought that Donna's forthright personality would be "the last thing the Holby staff need at the moment". Donna tries to lighten the atmosphere, although her upbeat persona is found to be inappropriate in the circumstances. Jacobs explained that Donna is "trying too hard" and that she "wants it all to work out so badly" because she enjoys being at the hospital. Donna's behaviour causes her to clash with Adrian "Fletch" Fletcher (Alex Walkinshaw), the ward manager of the Acute Assessment Unit (AAU), where Donna is based. Jacobs explained that Donna and Fletch clash when she fails to listen to Fletch's instructions. The actress enjoyed portraying the tension between the characters and preferred it to Donna being everyone's friend. Jacobs and Walkinshaw previously starred together on Waterloo Road as a married couple so they share a good relationship. The actress also confirmed that Donna and Fletch would not begin a relationship.

The reasons for Donna's return are unexplained for several episodes. However, Donna returns richer than she departed, which Jacobs thought was "very unlike Donna". The actress confirmed that Donna has developed "skeletons in her closet" after leaving Holby, which she brings with her when she returns. Donna has a close relationship with Ric Griffin (Hugh Quarshie), who acts as a father figure to her. Jacobs liked that Donna had one already established friendship when she returns.

=== Holby City cancellation ===
In June 2021, it was announced that Holby City had been cancelled after twenty-three series. Story producer Ben Wadey told Calli Kitson from Metro that the story team had to create suitable endings for all the regular characters. Jacobs was sad about the show's cancellation and struggled to leave her character behind. She named Donna's relationship with her father Derek as her favourite storyline. Jacobs filmed the final episode in December 2021, and it was broadcast in March 2022. Speaking to Kitson, Jacobs and Walkinshaw theorised that a spin-off series for their characters could be created.

In her final story, Donna become disillusioned with the NHS after struggling to cope with "an untenable workload". The story climaxes when Donna quits her job with immediate effect, having been offered a better job working in the private sector. Writers included scenes of Donna deliberating her decision to leave the NHS with Bernie Wolfe (Jemma Redgrave), who was guest starring in an episode. Jacobs did not appear in multiple episodes as a result of the story, returning prior to the show's finale. Donna appears again for the show's final three episodes. In her return, Donna asks Dominic Copeland (David Ames) to rehire her after realising that the private sector does not suit her. Across these episodes, Donna is involved in a story focusing on the treatment of vicar Lexy Morrell (Jenny Howe), a long-standing recurring character. Her appearance in the finale revolved around her support of Lexy as she undergoes surgery.

=== Casualty stint ===
On 23 March 2023, it was announced that Jacobs would join the regular cast of Casualty, reprising her role of Donna. The character is reintroduced as the new clinical nurse manager of the ED, having been reassigned from the surgical wards. Of her casting, Jacobs commented, "I am thrilled to be joining such a legendary show". Donna returns in the thirty-seventh series episode "Welcome to the Warzone", originally broadcast on 8 April 2023. Having previously guest starred in Casualty, Jacobs joined with preconceived ideas about the drama. However, she admitted to being surprised as it operates differently to Holby City. The show's story team plotted Donna at the centre of a new story when she causes a crash and lies about it. Jacobs struggled with the story as she did not believe it supported Donna's characterisation. The story concludes with Jacobs' departure from the series. In the narrative, Donna is sentenced to twelve months imprisonment. She departs in the series 38 episode "Too Much, Too Young", first broadcast on 16 September 2023.

== Reception and impact ==
Jacobs won the "Best Emerging Talent" accolade at the 2005 Screen Nation Awards for her role as Donna. She was also nominated for the "Best Newcomer" award at the 2004 National Television Awards, and the "Favourite Female TV Star" Screen Nation award in 2008. Discussing public reaction to her character, Jacobs stated that real nurses enjoyed her "man-eating antics", and were envious that Donna got away with wearing so much make-up. She commented, "I've never met anyone who has been sensitive about Donna throwing herself at men. The women I meet seem to appreciate her tactics." In the aftermath of the Donna/Mickie storyline, the BBC banned its actresses from appearing in raunchy photo-shoots, after Jacobs and Adams were photographed in intimate poses while dressed in nurses uniforms for various "lads' mags".

In November 2007, Shelley deemed Donna one of Holby City's few "really good, realistic, characters". He named Peters' casting as Donna's father his "Worst TV moment of the year" in 2009, however found their relationship "deeply moving". Donna's farewell speech to Derek was again called moving by both a reviewer for the Liverpool Daily Post, and Simon, though she had previously despaired at Donna's optimism despite Derek's terminal prognosis. The following year, What's on TV named Donna one of their favourite characters, praising her for taking a stance against Director of Surgery Henrik Hanssen (Guy Henry) in defence of her fellow nurses. Harper considered Donna "one of the most popular and iconic Holby characters ever".

Donna's relationship with Michael proved unpopular with critics. In an editorial discussing the boundaries between fiction and reality, The Guardian's Scott Murray and Barney Ronay declared their love for Donna, commending the way she "always has time for people" and recommending that she stay away from Michael as she deserves better. Bree Treacy of RTÉ.ie believes that Michael had better chemistry with Donna than with his wife Annalese, however similarly commented that he did not deserve Donna, never having seen her as more than "a notch on his stethoscope". Following her promotion to ward sister, Treacy hoped that the series producers would give Donna a man who would see her "as more than just a good time girl." Simon criticized Donna for failing to observe correct organ donation protocol in an attempt to win Michael's affection, commenting that she had "thrown her own heart willynilly at the first good-looking doctor she s[aw] with an ego the size of Texas." She later branded her "selfish to a fault" for her negative reaction to Kieran's posting to Afghanistan, but opined that Kieran "makes a far more suitable partner for her" than Michael did.

Several of Donna's pivotal episodes were selected as recommended viewing by critics. "Myself, Coming Back", the series ten episode in which she goes on a road-trip and discovers the existence of her niece, Mia, was named a televisual highlight by the Daily Mirror, Birmingham Post, and Liverpool Daily Echo, with the latter publication deeming it "refreshingly different" following the "doom and gloom" of preceding episodes. Many regional newspapers named "Promises", in which she decides to adopt Mia, a "pick of the day", and Sarah Morgan of the Daily Record cited Jacobs' appearance as Donna in the premiere episode of Casualty's twenty-fifth series as a positive example of the BBC "pull[ing] out all the stops to make sure the first edition in this latest run is something of a cracker." Ransom (What's on TV) looked forward to Donna's return, commenting, "We can't wait to see her get stuck back in to all the action!"
