= Kyla Tyson =

Fictional character from Holby City

- Holby City character
- First appearance: "I'll Be Back"; 8x17, 7 February 2006
- Last appearance: "Sweet Bitter Love"; 11x09, 9 December 2008
- Created by: Richard Stokes
- Portrayed by: Rakie Ayola

In-universe information
- Occupation: Staff nurse (2008); Ward sister (2006-2008)
- Spouse: Harvey Tyson
- Children: Max Tyson
- Nationality: Welsh
- Romances: Justin Fuller; Abra Durant

Kyla Tyson is a fictional character from the BBC medical drama Holby City, portrayed by actress Rakie Ayola. She appeared from 7 February 2006 to 9 December 2008, from the series eight episode "I'll Be Back" to the series eleven episode "Sweet Bitter Love". Ayola had made a former minor appearance in the show several years prior to being cast as Kyla, and was later asked to return in a more permanent role. She departed from the show after becoming pregnant with her second child.

Kyla is a nurse and single mother, constantly trying to balance her career, her child and her love life. Her storylines see her subjected to domestic abuse by her husband, temporarily lose her son to foster care and become an alcoholic. After getting her life back on track, she departs from Holby, moving to Ghana with her partner Abra Durant (Adrian Edmondson).

In August 2006, Ayola was shortlisted for the "Female Performance in TV" award at the fourth Screen Nation Awards for her portrayal of Kyla, and was granted "Honourable Mention" in the same category the following year. However, the character has also been criticised for the dramaticism of her storylines, and the manner in which they reflect upon real NHS nurses.

== Development ==
=== Casting ===
Prior to being cast as Kyla, Rakie Ayola had made former appearances in both Holby City and its sister show Casualty - in the former as a patient, in series five, episode 32 "By Any Other Name", and the latter as a patient's relative, in series 13, episode 19, "Trapped". She was approached about returning to Holby City in a more permanent role by BBC casting director Julie Harkin, who was also responsible for casting fellow Holby City newcomers Luke Roberts as Joseph Byrne and Tom Chambers as Sam Strachan. After a series of three meetings, two years after the birth of her first child, she agreed readily, despite being "nervous about signing such a long contract", and having claimed just sixteen months previously that she had no desire to work in any long running serial - lambasting the quality of long-term recurring characters by stating: "I watch lots of soaps and love watching them but I often think how frustrating it must be when they make a character into such an idiot. I think it would drive me mad to pick up a script and think, 'Who am I kissing now?'"

Ayola has since explained that her change of heart stemmed from becoming a mother. In the early years of her marriage to fellow actor Adam Smethurst the couple struggled financially, and with the added expense of the birth of their daughter, Ayola had been on the verge of giving up her acting career to begin a business franchise. On joining the cast of Holby City, she disclosed: "I've been someone who's loved the uncertainty of acting. I've loved that one month it's Sahara in Morocco and the next I'm doing a stage play, then it's a six-part telly thing. But last summer I started thinking it would be really nice not to have to look for a job every couple of weeks. It would be nice just to stay put for a while. If I'm going to be a working mum I'd rather just be one rather than be one intermittently. And then Holby came along, so I'm very grateful."

Ayola signed a three-year contract to play Kyla, which expired in October 2008. It was announced on 11 October 2008 that she would be departing from the show in order to have a second child. Ayola said of her decision to leave: "It's strange but sad at the same time. I've had a great time and I'll miss it. I made the decision purely because I was pregnant, but I wasn't really ready to put down the character of Kyla. I'm very sorry to have to let her go".

=== Personality ===
Upon announcing the character's arrival, BBC Publicity described Kyla as a "survivor", someone who had "been through a lot in her life, firstly losing out on her dream career as a runner and then escaping a violent marriage." It was stated: "Kyla is compassionate, feisty, gives others the benefit of the doubt, strong and loyal - but you wouldn't want to cross her. Kyla has a habit of picking the wrong men, she's inflexible once she's made her mind up and can be volatile if pushed. She has come to Holby with her son Max eager to start anew."

From May 2007 onwards, the character was portrayed as increasingly emotionally unstable, having had "her whole world crash down around her", following storylines including the death of her husband, and her son's request to be taken into foster care. As this emotional instability continued and worsened with the abrupt ending of another relationship, the character was seen to develop full blown alcoholism. Series producer Diana Kyle said of the storyline: "It's important we cover topics that are relevant today. Every day, people in the medical profession deal with patients who have drink or drug problems. Plus, the fact that some of the Holby staff are also suffering with these addictions is very pertinent to hospitals in real life." Speaking of Kyla's struggle to deal with her addiction, she added: "She'll work so hard to get her life together. She has a long way to go, but hopefully there's a light at the end of the tunnel..."

Discussing the storyline which saw Kyla's Alcoholics Anonymous companion Stuart McElroy (Conor Mullen) violently attack her colleague, Ward Sister Chrissie Williams (Tina Hobley), Ayola has stated: "It makes her finally accept what Stuart was capable of. She sees this huge gash and feels that all her instincts about other people are wrong – so she ends up running off. [...] [Kyla] has no excuses – all she can think is that she's really messed up and needs to leave." This plot strand saw Kyla once more resort to drinking while at work, and decide to quit her job, only to be talked out of doing so by Nursing Consultant Mark Williams (Robert Powell). Ayola explained: "He suggests she takes a demotion, so she'll have less to worry about and more time to deal with her problems. It's the lifeline she needs, because her work is all she has right now. I think if Kyla did leave, she'd end up simply going home and buying loads of cheap booze." When asked if Kyla would be able to overcome her addiction and regain custody of her son, Ayola responded: "I hope so. Kyla's had trouble being a good parent to Max, but she's had lots of time to reflect on why this is."

=== Relationships ===
Kyla was involved in three romantic relationships during her time in the show, the first of which was with physiotherapist Justin Fuller (Ben Richards). Ayola said of the relationship: "She hasn't got great taste in men! She likes good-looking blokes - that whole 'take me to a cave' thing - but she doesn't check that there is a soft, gentle, sensitive side to him. He's gorgeous to look at, but she hasn't learned that you have to look a bit deeper." Roger Griffiths was cast as Kyla's ex-husband Harvey. Ayola commented on their previous relationship: "I think they split up because Kyla is so volatile. The more we learn about Harvey the more I think he might not be the reason for their split". She expanded: "They had a tempestuous relationship and Kyla is very irrational which got too much for Harvey. Harvey brings out the worst in Kyla and she just ends up yelling at him. It's a very difficult and if he knew how to handle her maybe it could work out but he doesn't."

Asked in July 2006 what she hoped for Kyla in the long run, Ayola responded: "Most of all I'd like to see her laugh, big belly laughs as she has not done much of that! ...I also would like her to find a man that she is with not just because he is attractive but someone who can work her out and understand her". Several months after this interview, the character was romantically linked to newcomer and former guest star, general surgical consultant Abra Durant, played by Adrian Edmondson. Edmondson departed from and returned to the show several times, with Kyla and Abra breaking up and reuniting on multiple occasions. Asked in February 2008 whether the two would ever get back together, Ayola responded: "He treated Kyla like dirt, so I don't know if she'll forgive him, but I love working with Ade – he's a gorgeous man." The two ultimately left Holby together, moving to Ghana.

== Storylines ==
Kyla arrives at Holby General as an agency nurse in the episode "I'll Be Back". She makes a good impression on consultant Ric Griffin (Hugh Quarshie), and is invited to take on the position of Acting Sister. When her former boyfriend, physiotherapist Justin Fuller, begins working at the hospital, they briefly renew their relationship. Kyla tires of Justin's immaturity, however, and breaks up with him again. In retaliation, Justin kidnaps Kyla's son Max, plying him with alcohol, and sending him into a hypoglycemic coma. While Kyla and her ex-husband Harvey manage to get to Max in time to save him, Harvey tells Kyla she is an unfit mother and he will be filing for sole custody of their son.

Kyla and Harvey fight a brief custody battle. When it is revealed that Max has been bullying his classmates, his parents realise they need to set aside their differences for their son's sake. Shortly after this, Kyla begins a relationship with new general surgical consultant Abra Durant. Kyla helps Abra cover up an illegal xenotransplantation he performed, and keeps quiet when she discovers he has been stealing and shipping returned anti-retroviral drugs to African hospitals in need. When Abra's illegal dealings are uncovered, he is forced to flee the country, devastating Kyla.

Shaken by Abra's departure, when Max falls ill with food poisoning in the episode "Feast or Famine" Kyla realises he needs a male influence in his life and begrudgingly allows Harvey to move back in with them. Harvey becomes physically abusive, is suspended from his work as a police officer, and begins drinking heavily. When Harvey discovers lingerie bought for Kyla by Abra, the pair fall out once again, culminating in Harvey falling to his death from the hospital roof. Max, who witnessed this, blames his mother, causing her to lash out at him. As a result, he is taken into foster care, and although social services decide he may return to Kyla's custody, he requests to remain in his new foster home.

Abra returns to Holby, and although Kyla initially rebukes his advances, they ultimately resume their relationship, moving in together. Abra makes a drunken proposal to her in episode "Bad Reputation" however laughs it off as a joke when she assumes he is not serious. Kyla is seen to develop an increasing dependence on alcohol as she grieves for her son. When Abra abruptly terminates their relationship in order to move back to Africa, this alcohol dependence continues and worsens. Kyla is devastated when Max applies for a Guardianship Order, and becomes negligent at work, leading to the deaths of two patients. Kyla admits she has become an alcoholic and agrees to begin attending AA meetings. Initially this goes well, and she is supported by new consultant Stuart McElroy who is also an alcoholic. However, Kyla's confidence is damaged when Stuart violently attacks colleague Chrissie Williams, and she resorts to drinking once more. She attempts to hand in her notice, but Mark Williams persuades her to take a voluntary demotion to give her more time to deal with her problems.

Kyla is shocked when Abra returns to Holby again, contemplating going back to both him and alcohol, but managing to resist. In the episode "Send No Flowers", she is unexpectedly reunited with Max when he arrives at the hospital to visit his foster brother, a patient in Kyla's care. After an argument, Max suffers cardiac arrest and requires an operation. Kyla suspects he has been neglected by his foster mother. Max is initially highly defensive of her, but after a stern talking to by Abra, and being implored to do the right thing by Kyla, Max admits to his social worker that his foster mother is frequently neglectful. Kyla is delighted when he finally asks to come home with her.

Kyla briefly re-unites with Abra, when he reveals to her that he was subject to a machete attack in the Democratic Republic of the Congo, however he then leaves Holby once more to check himself into a psychiatric hospital. When Lola Griffin (Sharon D. Clarke) finds Abra being treated for post-traumatic stress by his own mother, she and Kyla convince Abra to discharge himself and return to Ghana. Shortly thereafter, Max is accepted into a prestigious football academy in Rotterdam, the Netherlands. Kyla hands in her notice, intent on leaving with him, however Max convinces Abra to return and take Kyla back to Ghana with him. Kyla initially refuses, but comes to realise that Max only wants to make her happy, and agrees to leave with Abra, who proposes marriage to her.

== Reception ==
Ayola was shortlisted in August 2006 for the "Female Performance in TV" award at the 2006 Screen Nation Awards, for her portrayal of the character. The 2007 Screen Nation Awards saw Ayola receive "Honourable Mention", again for "Female Performance in TV", however she failed to make shortlist this time around. Kyla has achieved mild popularity with Holby City fans. She was voted fans' fifth favourite newcomer of series eight in the official 2006 Holby.tv Awards, and she and Abra were voted fifth favourite couple of series nine, the following year in the 2007 awards.

The level of dramaticism of some of the character's storylines, as well as those of other Holby City nurses was heavily criticised by the Nursing and Midwifery Council. The lead article of the July 2007 issue of the NMC magazine tackled nurses in popular culture, discussing "the ease with which writers can attach terrible storylines to a caring profession", and stating: "Nurses who become prostitutes to pay the bills, nurses who kill their husbands, nurses who abuse the system to get their own way - Holby City has always been a hotbed of slanderous storylines. Good people doing bad things makes excellent entertainment... The bald fact is that real life nurses doing their jobs well just aren't that entertaining."

Kyla's "no-nonsense" personality has led to mixed reviews in the press. A number of episodes central to her storylines have been reviewed by various publications as televisual 'picks of the day' - from her introductory episode, to the death of her husband, to the surprise return of her former boyfriend Abra. Her "fiery" stance resulted in the assessment that, from a viewing perspective, the character "has never been one of the more likeable members of staff", however her descent into alcoholism drew some more sympathetic reviews, with Linda Gibson of TV Quick writing of the character: "Let's hope that Kyla pulls herself together, gets her son back and meets a man who can give her what she wants." Conversely, Daily Mirror TV critic Jim Shelley opined that the character had formerly been one of the more "normal" and "reliable" members of the cast, but criticized the handling of her alcoholism storyline, stating that the character seemed to have become an alcoholic "overnight".

In October 2007, drinks' industry body the Portman Group made an official complaint to communications regulator Ofcom about a scene in Holby City which depicted two medics drinking five shots of tequila following a stressful day at work. The body's chief executive David Poley claimed that in failing to show the negative consequences of this action, the series was presenting a "highly irresponsible portrayal of excessive and rapid drinking". Ofcom received a total of eight complaints about the incident. In response to the accusation that "We would expect the BBC to take greater care with the portrayal of alcohol in programmes", the BBC released a statement tying the complaint closely to the alcoholism storyline being played out with Kyla at the time, explaining that: "Holby City is in the middle of a storyline in which a key character (Kyla) has spiralling problems in her personal and professional life because of alcohol – a storyline that fully and realistically depicts the negative impact of alcohol dependency in the workplace. Kyla has now been seen to seek help for alcoholism and the audience will see how she fares on the road to recovery."

== In popular culture ==
The 17 November 2006 Children in Need charity telethon included a segment featuring the Holby City cast performing a version of Hung Up by Madonna. Ayola as Kyla featured prominently in this sketch, performing the song's bridge and providing vocals for its introduction.

The 16 November 2007 Children in Need appeal again contained a musical performance from Holby City cast members. Ayola, alongside Nadine Lewington (Maddy Young) and Phoebe Thomas (Maria Kendall) provided backing vocals for Sharon D Clarke (Lola Griffin), who performed a soul version of Aretha Franklin's signature song, Respect.

On 3 June 2008, BBC Two cooking programme Ready Steady Cook broadcast a Holby City special, featuring Ayola and Edmondson. As well as competing over their cooking skills, the pair discussed their characters' relationship and storylines.
