= Stuart McElroy =

Fictional character from the BBC medical drama Holby City

- Holby City character
- Conor Mullen as Stuart McElroy
- First appearance: "The Apprentice"; 6 November 2007
- Last appearance: "The Extra Mile"; 12 February 2008
- Portrayed by: Conor Mullen

In-universe information
- Occupation: Cardiothoracic consultant
- Spouse: Amelia McElroy
- Significant other: Chrissie Williams

Stuart McElroy is a fictional character from the BBC medical drama Holby City, played by actor Conor Mullen. He first appeared in the series ten episode "The Apprentice", broadcast on 6 November 2007. Producers approached Mullen with the offer to play Stuart. The character arrives at Holby City hospital as a locum cardiothoracic consultant to look after the Darwin ward in the absence of Connie Beauchamp (Amanda Mealing). He soon begins a feud with registrar Sam Strachan (Tom Chambers) and a romance with ward sister Chrissie Williams (Tina Hobley). Stuart is characterised as a charming surgeon but one who has a possessive side. He is an alcoholic whose wife Amelia left him prior to his arrival. His jealousy becomes an issue when he tries to control Chrissie and she ends their relationship. He begins drinking more heavily resulting in him holding Chrissie hostage and slashing her across the face with a scalpel. Stuart made his final appearance in series ten, episode 18, "The Extra Mile".

== Development ==
Stuart is a locum cardiothoracic consultant who first appears in the series ten episode titled "The Apprentice", which was broadcast on 6 November 2007. The BBC had approached Mullen with the offer of playing the role of Stuart. The actor is often hired to assume the "bad guy" role. Holby City's series producer Diana Kyle described Stuart as "dishy", "sexy" and a "good-looking" new addition to the show. The BBC described Stuart following his departure as "a people person full of Irish charm. But he was also a deeply jealous alcoholic and needed to control the person he saw as 'his'." In his backstory his first wife Amelia had decided to leave Stuart due to his drinking. He arrives on the wards take on duties left by Connie Beauchamp (Amanda Mealing) who has decided to take a sabbatical. She tells registrars Sam Strachan (Tom Chambers) and Joseph Byrne (Luke Roberts) that they will need to impress Stuart. Stuart refuses to perform an operation on a heavy smoker and Sam supports his decision. But Joseph challenges him, which leads to Stuart favouring Joseph over Sam who he believes is immature. The show further developed Stuart's rivalries with Connie and Sam, but made an ally in fellow alcoholic Kyla Tyson (Rakie Ayola). When Connie arrives back from her leave early, she is unimpressed with how Stuart has run Darwin and clashes with him.

Stuart's time on the show sees him embark on a romantic relationship with sister Chrissie Williams (Tina Hobley). A Radio Times writer stated that "Stuart fails to make a good impression on Chrissie with his reorganisation of the ward, but his charm subdues her arguments." Their connection was heightened when a crossbow attack was launched within the hospital. Upon discovering that Chrissie was alive and well, the two characters shared a kiss. As they continue their romance, Chrissie often spends time with her ex-boyfriend Sam who is suffering from cancer. When Sam falls asleep and misses an operation Stuart excuses his behaviour but Keith Greene (Alex Macqueen) becomes concerned and reports the situation to Connie. Chrissie believes that Stuart orchestrated the situation to remove Sam from the ward. Hobley told a What's on TV reporter that Stuart "becomes slightly possessive and he's always there when she's with Sam. Then Chrissie finds out that he’s tried to get Sam off her ward and he’s done it in a way that makes Sam look incompetent."

Chrissie decides to end her relationship when she finds evidence of Stuart's vendetta against Sam. She discovers missing patient notes in Stuart's locker that he had stolen from Sam. This causes Stuart to start drinking more frequently and his behaviour becomes erratic. Hobley told Katy Moon from Inside Soap that Stuart "basically lost the plot". He goes to Alcoholics Anonymous meetings but starts discussing Chrissie to fellow attendees. She decides to move on but "unbeknownst to Chrissie, he's been ranting about her [...] he's convinced himself that they can get back together, but she knows that's never going to happen."

While on shift a patient under Chrissie's care suffers heavy bleeding and Stuart is forced to work alongside her. Chrissie notices Stuart has been drinking alcohol and confronts him. She is shocked to learn the full extent of his alcoholism and refuses to work with him. Stuart sees this as a rejection and harasses her to get back together. Hobley explained that Stuart loves Chrissie and cannot give her up and her rejection "sends him over the edge" leading to an "awful confrontation". Stuart chases Chrissie in an operating theatre and slashes her across the face with a scalpel. He then ties her up, gags her mouth and stitches her face up. As Stuart is drunk he makes "an awful job" of Chrissie's wound. The actress described the scenes as "horrific" and said her character is "absolutely terrified". Connie arrives outside of the theatre and manages to free Chrissie.

Hobley later recalled the difficulty she and Mullen had filming the scenes. She said "I was being chased around the operating theatre with a scalpel four months pregnant, pretending I wasn't pregnant -- that was hard work." On-screen Stuart continues his abuse and tries to convince Connie that Chrissie is mentally ill and cut herself. Stuart then tries to locate Chrissie, who goes into hiding to escape him. Hobley said the attack leaves her character "physically and psychologically scarred". She then has to find evidence to convince everyone that Stuart was the one who caused her injuries. Stuart is subsequently arrested, and makes his final appearance in series ten, episode 18, "The Extra Mile". Stuart then tries to make amends with Chrissie by sending her a compensation cheque for twenty-five-thousand pounds.

== Reception ==
A writer from the Daily Record included the episode in which Stuart attacked Chrissie in their "pick of the day" feature. They said it had "devastating consequences" and branded it a "disastrous turn of events". A Daily Star writer also named the episode in their "pick of the day". They branded Stuart as "seriously bladdered" and "deranged". A What's on TV reporter branded Stuart a "sexy surgeon" and added that Chrissie thought she had found "the one" when she got with him. The Swanswell Trust project, a domestic violence charity produced by Warwickshire County Council, welcomed the storyline for helping to raise awareness. They assessed that "if Stuart's character got in touch with the Swanswell Trust, they would work with him to reduce the levels of alcohol he was drinking to within safe limits by exploring how his current use affects others. If Chrissie contacted them, she would be given support to make choices about her life, referred for counselling and would receive help to keep safe."

A reporter from the Coventry Telegraph said that Stuart and Chrissie's storyline was "hard-hitting" and highlighted a problem in British society. A Liverpool Daily Post writer said that Stuart gets "drunk and goes bonkers" and called it a "shocking storyline" and "ghoulish plot". Inside Soap's Katy Moon believed that Stuart was a "psychotic" character and thought the attack on Chrissie made "horrifying" and "gritty" scenes. In 2022, Victoria Wilson and Elaine Reilly from What's on TV chose Stuart attacking Chrissie in their top five moments in the show's history. They branded Stuart "charming" with a "sinister side".
