= Holby City series 8 =

Holby City
- Series 8
- No. of episodes: 52

Release
- Original network: BBC One
- Original release: 18 October 2005 – 17 October 2006

Series chronology
- ← Previous; Series 7 Next → Series 9

The eighth series of the British medical drama television series Holby City commenced airing in the United Kingdom on BBC One on 18 October 2005, and concluded on 17 October 2006.

== Cast ==
=== Main characters ===
- Kelly Adams as Mickie Hendrie (until episode 47)
- Rakie Ayola as Kyla Tyson (from episode 17)
- Adam Best as Matt Parker
- Paul Bradley as Elliot Hope (from episode 4)
- Tom Chambers as Sam Strachan (from episode 12)
- Sharon D. Clarke as Lola Griffin
- Ade Edmondson as Abra Durant (from episode 33)
- Michael French as Nick Jordan (episodes 11-37)
- Paul Henshall as Dean West
- Tina Hobley as Chrissie Williams
- Jaye Jacobs as Donna Jackson
- Verona Joseph as Jess Griffin (episode 15)
- Rosie Marcel as Jac Naylor (from episode 6)
- Sharon Maughan as Tricia Williams
- Amanda Mealing as Connie Beauchamp
- Mark Moraghan as Owen Davis (until episode 10)
- Patricia Potter as Diane Lloyd
- Robert Powell as Mark Williams
- Hugh Quarshie as Ric Griffin
- Luke Roberts as Joseph Byrne (from episode 12)

=== Recurring and guest characters ===
- Scott Adkins as Bradley Hume (episodes 32–52)
- Gillian Bevan as Gina Hope (episodes 23–52)
- Martin Hancock as Reg Lund (until episode 52)
- Andrew Lewis as Paul Rose
- Alex Macqueen as Keith Greene
- Ben Richards as Justin Fuller (episodes 23–37)
- Patrick Toomey as Christopher Sutherland (from episode 25)

== Episodes ==
| No. overall | No. in series | Title | Directed by | Written by | Original release date | Viewers (millions) |
|---|---|---|---|---|---|---|
| 264 | 1 | "The Outsiders" | Fraser MacDonald | Anita Pandolfo | 18 October 2005 | 7.06 |
Chrissie is convinced she is pregnant. Ric confronts his own prejudices and Matt finally proves he has a bedside manner.
| 265 | 2 | "Test Your Metal" "A Great Leap Forward" | Rob Evans | Suzie Smith | 26 October 2005; 27 October 2005 (Note: The episode was split into two 30-minute episodes as part of a Casualty@Holby City crossover, broadcast over two nights as "Test Your Metal" and "A Great Leap Forward".) | 4.57; 5.64 |
Comfort is rushed into theatre and operated on by Diane Lloyd, Ric Griffin and Matt Parker.: Part three and four of a Casualty@Holby City Halloween crossover.
| 266 | 3 | "Crimes and Misdemeanours" | Rob Evans | Michael Jenner | 1 November 2005 | 7.02 |
Diane urges Dean to be realistic about his limitations, leaving him more determined than ever to prove his worth.
| 267 | 4 | "More Equal Than Others" | Fraser MacDonald | Andrew Holden | 8 November 2005 | 7.81 |
A new surgeon arrives at the hospital, and Connie is outraged to learn he has been given Loftwood's position. Lola's daughter moves in with her boyfriend.: First Appearance of Elliot Hope*.
| 268 | 5 | "Butterfly Effect" | Richard Platt | Elsa Cranworth | 15 November 2005 | 7.60 |
Donna's past comes back to haunt her when she meets the teenager who asked her for an abortion pill weeks earlier - and the girl's mother shows up at the hospital
| 269 | 6 | "Bird on a Wire" | Richard Platt | Andrea Earl | 22 November 2005 | 6.75 |
Ric pushes to perform extreme surgery on one of his patients, with disastrous consequences for himself. Meanwhile, Owen finally decides between Chrissie and Diane.: First Appearance of Jac Naylor*
| 270 | 7 | "Learning Curve" | Steve Finn | Andrew Cornish | 29 November 2005 | 6.82 |
Diane takes her consultants exam and passes, but is she ready for promotion? An encounter in a lift jeopardizes Dean's chances in the practical exam.
| 271 | 8 | "Comfort of Strangers" | Steve Finn | Jonathan Myerson & Robert Fraser | 6 December 2005 | 6.85 |
Amy returns to the hospital, but her reckless behaviour prompts Donna to call social services. Chrissie tells Owen she's leaving Holby, forcing him to make a decision.
| 272 | 9 | "Prometheus Unbound" | Julie Anne Robinson | Andrew Holden | 13 December 2005 | 7.04 |
Abra returns to Holby and asks Ric to perform a transplant operation. However, the injury to the surgeon's hand means he can't operate. Laura finds out Owen's secrets.
| 273 | 10 | "The Long Goodbye" | Julie Anne Robinson | Debbie O'Malley | 20 December 2005 | 6.07 |
Owen brings his daughter to work, and realizes he has to think very clearly about his priorities. Amy's stepfather takes legal action, while her mother realizes the truth: Last Appearance of Owen Davies*
| 274 | 11 | "Deny Thy Father, Part II" | Paul Harrison | Gaby Chiappe | 27 December 2005 | 8.86 |
Part two of a two-hour-long Casualty@Holby City crossover special. Bernie Doyle and Mitch Campbell are unhappy Bernie's daughter, Tara, and Mitch's son, Lee, are dating. A car chase involving Lee and Bernie's son, Sean causes an accident.: Return of Nick Jordan*
| 275 | 12 | "Mother Love" | Claire Armspach | Tony McHale | 3 January 2006 | 7.61 |
Two medics apply for the registrar's position, Connie sees an opportunity to advance her own career, and a patient brings back painful memories for Tricia.: First Appearance of Sam Strachan and Joseph Byrne*
| 276 | 13 | "Pride Before a Fall" | James Erskine | Len Collin | 10 January 2006 | 7.02 |
Ric has plenty of problems on his hands as the new ward opens, and Donna applies for a new job - only to find Mickie has already been appointed.
| 277 | 14 | "Yesterday Once More" | Steve Kelly | Gaby Chiappe | 17 January 2006 | 7.14 |
Mark learns the truth about Chrissie's parentage when Frank's life insurance company gets in touch. Jac returns and Ric advises Diane to take some time off
| 278 | 15 | "Brother's Keeper" | Steve Kelly | Peter Lloyd | 24 January 2006 | 7.29 |
Jess returns to work after the death of her son but finds her newfound determination put to the test when young patient Archie presents with a lacerated spleen and she suspects possible child abuse. Meanwhile, Mark tries to deal with the news that Chrissie is not his daughter.
| 279 | 16 | "Roots" | Richard Platt | Tony McHale | 31 January 2006 | 7.46 |
Connie's old school boyfriend Peter Holland arrives in the emergency department with a case of rheumatic fever and reveals childhood secrets about Connie. Mark and Lola become very involved in the treatment of two young brothers who have been beaten up. Elsewhere, Mickie loses her drunk patient Liz.
| 280 | 17 | "I'll Be Back" | Richard Platt | Colin Bytheway | 7 February 2006 | 7.09 |
New nurse Kyla abandons a patient during a critical period and the rest of the team want answers. Meanwhile, in a bid to get Ric's support Jac and Diane go head to head in their procedures.: First Appearance of Kyla Tyson*
| 281 | 18 | "Flight of the Bumblebee" | Ian Barber | Jeff Dodds | 14 February 2006 | 6.96 |
Sam performs a risky operation that he has never done before. Elliot gets a new PA, and Chrissie acquires a secret admirer.
| 282 | 19 | "Out on a Limb" | Ian Barber | Mark Cairns | 21 February 2006 | 6.52 |
Lola's daughter reveals her plans to go travelling with her boyfriend. Sam's good intentions backfire, while Jac and Diane treat a man who has fallen down a lift shaft.
| 283 | 20 | "We Gave Her All Our Love" | Indra Bhose | Michael Jenner | 28 February 2006 | 7.88 |
Jac is not pleased to see new consultant Nick Jordan and it's obvious the pair have a history. Later, Nick treats one of Ric's cancer patients while Ric is out lecturing at the university. But there's trouble on the horizon when he goes against Ric's chosen course of action and performs a risky operation. Elsewhere, Matt is dealing with a difficult patient. The young girl tests his patience to the limits but he finally manages to win her round, which impresses Lola.
| 284 | 21 | "Into Your Own Hands" | Indra Bhose | Stephanie Lloyd-Jones | 7 March 2006 | 6.40 |
Mark gets over involved in a case which causes disastrous consequences. Meanwhile, Nick Jordan rocks Diane's world which may affect her relationship with Ric.
| 285 | 22 | "Let it Shine" | Nick Jones | Len Collin | 14 March 2006 | 7.11 |
When Nick learns that Ric is away from Holby for the day he is determined to get one over on him. Meanwhile, Kyla learns that the best way to be a leader is to be herself.
| 286 | 23 | "Leap in the Dark" | Nick Jones | Andrea Earl | 21 March 2006 | 6.84 |
Elliot battles with his personal fears as he tries to get Sandra Wilson well enough to accept a new heart whilst doing everything he can to get concert recital tickets for his ill wife Gina. Matt finally admits to Mark what he really thinks of him. Meanwhile, Donna is bowled over by new physiotherapist, Justin, but will she heed Kyla's warnings about him?: First Appearance of Justin Fuller*
| 287 | 24 | "Snake in the Grass" | Colin Teague | Johanne McAndrew | 28 March 2006 | 6.33 |
Nick continues to cause trouble by working on a patient with a cardio thoracic (CT) condition. When the patient's condition deteriorates, Jac decides not to involve Nick again and doesn't page him. Nick is furious when he finds out. Elsewhere, Chrissie is concerned by Mark's erratic behaviour and tells him to take some time off. Matt and Dean both apply for the student scholarship but their lax attitude doesn't impress Joseph.
| 288 | 25 | "Passing On" | Colin Teague | Pete Hambly | 4 April 2006 | 7.26 |
Nick and Ric both use underhand tactics to get Diane on side. Nick wins Diane round by letting her perform a difficult procedure for the first time and therefore saving the patient. After the operation Nick asks Diane out for a drink but she refuses, for now! Meanwhile, Connie is devastated when the new device she is championing cannot save her patient Sandra. Elsewhere, Kyla brings her son Max into work as he is diabetic and his blood sugar reading is high. The stressful day gets to her and Justin sees a chance to escape.
| 289 | 26 | "Quality Time" | Simon Massey | Martin Jameson | 11 April 2006 | 7.13 |
Elliot fears for his wife's failing health - a secret he is keeping from their daughter. Sam uncovers a family secret when he treats a boy who needs a heart transplant.
| 290 | 27 | "Honesty" | Ian Jackson | Jenny Lecoat | 18 April 2006 | 6.64 |
Ric risks his friendship with Diane in an attempt to save her from Nick Jordan's clutches. Meanwhile, Joseph finds himself in trouble at work and Matt makes a career changing decision.
| 291 | 28 | "Judge Not Lest Ye Be Judged" | Ian Jackson | Paul Coates | 25 April 2006 | 5.86 |
Diane is determined to prove Ric wrong about Nick Jordan and a desperate Tricia tries to keep the truth from a suspicious Chrissie.
| 292 | 29 | "Short Cuts" | Steve Finn | Veronica Henry | 2 May 2006 | 6.53 |
Joseph struggles to stay in control as tension builds between Nick and Ric. Donna is thrilled to have a new man in her life but can Justin really give her what she truly needs?
| 293 | 30 | "Lead Us Not into Temptation" | Steve Finn | Debbie O'Malley | 9 May 2006 | 6.10 |
Sam draws Chrissie and Matt into a risky game in order to secure a heard for recovering alcoholic Dillon Ellis. When Helena Bosman is readmitted to hospital Nick assigns the follow-up surgery to Diane who covers up a potential problem in order for Ric to see Nick in a better light. It all goes pear-shaped when Helena has a massive brain hemorrhage and is declared brain-dead. Meanwhile, Donna refuses to work with Justin as Kyla tries to keep a lid on her returning feelings for Justin.
| 294 | 31 | "Games of Chance" | Jim Doyle | Peter Lloyd | 16 May 2006 | 6.37 |
An inquest into the death of Helena Bosman throws the spotlight on Nick and Diane. Meanwhile, Sam plays a practical joke on Joseph.
| 295 | 32 | "One Tender Kiss" | Jim Doyle | Graham Mitchell | 23 May 2006 | 6.46 |
Diane feels the full force of Nick Jordan's betrayal when her career hangs in the balance. Matt tries to get out of debt but only gets into trouble with Connie and Reg attempts to get Donna to go out with him fall flat and she ends up going off with Justin again.: First Appearance of Bradley Hume*
| 296 | 33 | "Abracadabra" | Indra Bhose | Joe Ainsworth | 6 June 2006 | 5.52 |
Abra returns from Africa ready to turn over a new leaf. Tricia vows to make a go of it with Mark but gets bad news from Diane - her cancer has returned. Mickie learns she could clear Diane's name but it is to no avail and puts her chances of getting a reference for her medical school application in jeopardy.
| 297 | 34 | "Invasion" | Indra Bhose | Len Collin | 7 June 2006 | 4.17 |
Don Bosman returns to the hospital to retrieve Helena's body and is furious to find out her heart was donated without his consent. Sam and Elliot operate on Dillon.
| 298 | 35 | "Promises to Keep" | Ian Barber | Nick Warburton | 29 June 2006 | 4.40 |
Elliot lets his personal feelings get the better of him when Gina is re-admitted. Sam is put on report but continues to do things on his own terms - will he learn his lesson?
| 299 | 36 | "The Truth Will Out" | Ian Barber | Andrea Earl | 6 July 2006 | 4.86 |
Nic Jordan steps up his campaign to get back into CT. Mark tries to save Chrissie from a painful truth, but unearths shocking news about Tricia.
| 300 | 37 | "Extreme Measures" | Colin Teague | Tony McHale | 11 July 2006 | 5.43 |
Jordan helps Connie save the day when a black tie charity dinner turns into a disaster zone. In an attempt to ingratiate himself with Kyla, Justin offers to look after Max.: Departure of Justin Fuller and Nick Jordan*.
| 301 | 38 | "I Am Not What I Am" | Peter Rose | Bradley Quirk | 18 July 2006 | 4.80 |
Matt is thrown out of his rented accommodation with his landlord retaining his medical books until he pays his back rent. He signs up for clinical trials to make a fast buck but the consequences are dangerous. Lola wants to save young mother Kerry Peters to keep her baby from going into care.
| 302 | 39 | "Looking After Number One" | Peter Rose | Alun Nipper | 25 July 2006 | 5.19 |
Bradley outlines his cost-cutting plans for the hospital, dividing opinions among his staff. Joseph returns to the wards, but his OCD is not under control.
| 303 | 40 | "Conscience" | Rob Evans | Pete Hambly | 1 August 2006 | 5.80 |
Lola makes a drastic decision regarding baby Leeanne's care. Reg wonders if Bradley's intentions towards Donna are honourable. Jac works closely with Joseph.
| 304 | 41 | "Metamorphosis" | Rob Evans | Sasha Hails | 8 August 2006 | 5.96 |
It's the day of Michael Beauchamp's appeal. Connie, Michael's wife is keen to press on with daily work on Darwin, however her mind is obviously elsewhere. She leaves the hospital to attend Michael's appeal, which he wins. Connie returns to work after the appeal, to operate on a dancer who has a heart infection due to an abortion which she had earlier in the year. Michael turns up at the hospital and gets into a scrape with a journalist, landing himself in AAU with a head injury. Connie visits him and tells Michael they will talk later. Connie is on Darwin when Michael later turns up with a Thai take-away. Connie tells Michael he may return home with her, where they can eat and talk. Elsewhere, Lola is reluctant to let Leanne's dad take her home. After she suspects him of being a drug user, she runs tests which prove inconclusive, and Lola realises he is diabetic. She reluctantly lets him take the baby home, but it's clear Lola is upset.
| 305 | 42 | "Team Holby" | Ian Jackson | Debbie O'Malley | 15 August 2006 | 5.89 |
Connie's heart battles her mind as she wonders if she should stay at Holby. Mark learns to respect the way Tricia wants to handle her cancer.
| 306 | 43 | "Horse to Water" | Ian Jackson | Michael Jenner | 22 August 2006 | 6.10 |
A late-stage Motor Neurone Disease sufferer arrives on Darwin. It turns out that she has undergone brain stem treatment abroad to try and correct her MND. Surgeon Elliot Hope, whose wife is also a MND sufferer is impressed by the patient's story and informs Gina. Connie and Joseph are very skeptical on the brain stem treatment, however Elliot tries to persuade his wife to take the chance. In the end she agrees to go abroad to try brain stem treatment in a bid to control her MND. Elsewhere, it's Matt's first day as a qualified doctor on Keller
| 307 | 44 | "Bad Blood" | Richard Platt | Martin Jameson | 29 August 2006 | 6.55 |
Ric warns Lola of the danger of becoming involved with her patient's father Trevor Heron. Connie begins to feel broody and sets her sights on Sam Strachan much to the annoyance of Chrissie. Meanwhile, Matt desperately tries to clear his name and nearly starts an all out war with the nursing staff.
| 308 | 45 | "Nothing Ventured, Nothing Lost" | Richard Platt | Sara Turner | 5 September 2006 | 6.79 |
Kyla loses her cool under pressure with Chrissie as she is monitored by her son's social case worker. Mark's engagement proposal doesn't go as well as he had planned and Sam finds himself as the "meat in the sandwich" between Chrissie and Connie.
| 309 | 46 | "Better the Devil You Know" | John Greening | Paul Coates | 6 September 2006 | 4.75 |
Mickie's love life takes a turn for the better when she falls for patient Kim Felix. Steve Spence is re-admitted to Holby and Lola becomes concerned for his baby daughter Leanne and proposes herself as temporary foster mum to Leanne until Steve gets clean. Elsewhere, a determined Chrissie pursues Sam unknowing of his secret involvement with Connie. Meanwhile, Abra returns to Holby and clashes with Ric over the treatment of Kim's long-lost brother Pete Golding who is awaiting a viable kidney transplant. When the transplant fails Abra offers Pete an illegal transplant.
| 310 | 47 | "Star Maker" | John Greening | Johanne McAndrew & Elliot Hope | 12 September 2006 | 6.22 |
Abra's patient Pete Golding agrees to Abra's illegal kidney transplant. Mickie makes the biggest decision of her life by helping Abra and putting her fledgling romance with Kim in jeopardy. After surgery Ric gives her a glowing reference for her to leave and study at Newcastle University Medical School. Kim decides to relocate to Newcastle with her. Recovering MND patient Margaret Wrightman dies as a result of her aortic valve treatment. Elliott worries how this news will affect Gina as she prepares to fly to Singapore for the same stem cell treatment that Margaret underwent. Elliot and Gina talk and they both decide to spend what time they have together and not undergo the procedure.: Last Appearance of Mickie Hendrie*
| 311 | 48 | "Just Another Day" | Christopher King | Mark Cairns | 19 September 2006 | 5.96 |
Lola is determined to gain custody of Leanne and goes to extreme lengths to impress social worker Frankie Weston including asking Ric to pretend that they live together. Meanwhile, Tricia asks Mark if his offer of marriage still stands and accepts.
| 312 | 49 | "Now or Never" | Christopher King | Andrew Holden | 26 September 2006 | 6.50 |
Roger is back on AAU but his immune system is dangerously low due to his HIV. His son, Zak, also returns and after a few home truths from his dad, he makes peace with him but Roger dies leaving Zak devastated. Elsewhere, Tricia finds out that Mark plans for them to get married today, and she's not pleased when she learns he organised the wedding because she is about to "kick the bucket". After talking to Roger's son Zak, Tricia realises she's not ready to give up and she and Mark finally tie the knot. Meanwhile, patients on AAU are having adverse reactions to drugs, resulting in Matt questioning Donna's competence again. After Reg carries out tests in his lab, it is discovered that the hospital drug supply, organised by Bradley, is full of faulty pills.
| 313 | 50 | "Taking Liberties" | Fraser MacDonald | Mark Catley | 3 October 2006 | 6.12 |
Gina Hope tells Connie that she wishes to go to an assisted suicide clinic in Switzerland and enlists her help in filing the application. Connie at first refuses but after hearing a taped message than Gina made for Elliott she agrees. Matt continues to question the validity of the drugs available in Holby and enlists Reg's help. They run tests on samples from the Holby pharmacy and find that the drugs are below par in nearly all cases and nearly results in Ric losing an obese man on the operating table.
| 314 | 51 | "If The Heart Lies" | Fraser MacDonald | Peter Lloyd | 10 October 2006 | 6.14 |
Ric pursues Bradley Hume over the dodgy drugs after he sees him being gifted expensive champagne by a pharmaceutical rep. Connie gets involved in Gina's plight after she gets her acceptance letter from the assisted suicide clinic in Switzerland. Meanwhile, Sam works out where he stands with Connie.
| 315 | 52 | "Moondance" | Nigel Douglas | Tony McHale | 17 October 2006 | 6.83 |
Connie arrives with a very determined Gina in Switzerland but Connie is in turmoil and rings Elliott who flies out to Switzerland to be with Gina in her last hours. Elliott also tells Connie he knows she's pregnant. As Bradley's position at Holby becomes increasingly shaky, Reg opens his heart to Donna.: Last Appearance of Bradley Hume Reg Lund and Gina Hope*
