= Abra Durant =

Fictional consultant general and cardiothoracic surgeon

- Holby City character
- Adrian Edmondson as Abra Durant
- First appearance: 7x38, "Tuesday's Child", 2005
- Last appearance: 11x09, "Sweet Bitter Love", 9 December 2008
- Portrayed by: Adrian Edmondson

In-universe information
- Occupation: Locum Consultant General Surgeon, prev. Cardiothoracics, Critical Care
- Family: Cecil Heaney (father); Elizabeth Mills (mother)
- Children: Kyle Wallis
- Romances: Kyla Tyson (fiancée)

Percival "Abra" Durant is a fictional character from the BBC medical drama Holby City, portrayed by actor Adrian Edmondson. The character first appeared on-screen on 5 July 2005 in the episode "Tuesday's Child", episode 38 of the show's seventh series. Initially making a one-off, guest-appearance, Edmondson has since reprised the role of Abra numerous times, stating that he has loved the show since its 1999 conception. He departed from the show for the final time on 9 December 2008, in episode "Sweet Bitter Love".

Abra's initial role in the show was that of Third World rights champion and humorous surgical maverick, whose major storylines centered on serious rule breaking (including stealing returned anti-retroviral drugs to send to African countries in need, performing an experimental xenotransplantation without authorisation, and secretly using Holby City Hospital's theatres at night to perform charity operations on African children) as well as his relationship with colleague nurse Kyla Tyson. Upon returning to the show in April 2008, the character took a darker turn, resorting to self-harm as a symptom of post-traumatic stress, following a harrowing experience in the war torn Congo.

Well received by the show's fans, writers and directors, Abra has established an enduring popularity which has seen Edmondson invited back to the programme regularly. TV critics have proved almost entirely favourable to the character, even when commenting on the unrealistic quality of many of his storylines.

== Creation ==
=== Background ===
It was first announced on 4 May 2005 that comedian Adrian Edmondson would be making a guest appearance in Holby City in July of that year, although the character he would be playing was not disclosed. The storyline running at the time saw established character, General Surgical Consultant Ric Griffin (Hugh Quarshie), depart from Holby to work in his brother's hospital in Ghana, with Registrar Diane Lloyd (Patricia Potter) following on in an attempt to persuade him home. Edmondson's character, Abra Durant, was introduced as a new friend and colleague of Ric's, also working in his brother's clinic. Although the character's given name is actually Percival, it was explained within the episode that he goes by Abra, short for the Ghanaian name 'Abrafo', meaning 'troublemaker'. The episode was shot on location in Ghana, and formed part of the BBC's 'Africa Lives' series, aiming "to give the viewers a more rounded portrayal of African life and culture through special editions of favourite shows as well as new commissions."

=== Casting ===
Edmondson has discussed the surprised reaction he encountered upon assuming the role of Abra, stating: "I'm sure people are surprised I'm in it, but I don't give a toss. I have always liked it. It's like any soap - if you watch it, you get stuck in. I love working on it." He has mentioned that he is the only cast member to have been a fan of the show since its 1999 conception, that both he and his youngest daughter Freya often watch it together "as a bonding exercise", and going as far as to describe the role as "a dream". Commenting on his decision only ever to reprise the role of Abra on short term contracts, Edmondson has stated that: "I don't think I could handle any longer. The regulars on the show work very, very hard. Basically I don't think I could do what they do and still be alive."

Several of Edmondson's Holby City co-stars have described feeling intimidated by the prospect of working alongside him for the first time, stemming from his already well established fame. Rakie Ayola explained: "I thought it was going to be difficult at the beginning because he wasn't speaking to me. But he was initially just a little shy and sussing things out. He's a lot quieter than you would expect but then suddenly he'll say something that has everybody doubled up in laughter. You won't find anyone who doesn't like him." Edmondson himself has added that he gets along well with the cast, although finds that the distance of Elstree Studios from most of their London homes makes them "weirdly unsociable".

Edmondson's casting in the role followed a trend remarked upon by television critic Jim Shelley, who noted a tendency of Holby City producers toward hiring already well established actors, including Jesus of Nazareth star Robert Powell and actress Patsy Kensit. When asked in November 2007 whether she actively sought out well-known names to fill new roles in the show, series producer Diana Kyle responded: "It's lovely when we have a new member of the cast come in and bring an audience with them. But we want the best actors, and the star names we cast are always the best - which is why we go for them!"

== Development ==
=== Personality ===
Describing the character following his October 2007 departure from the show, the BBC attested: "Rebellious surgeon Abra was an anti-authoritarian and would always fight for what he believed in, even if it broke the rules. He worked hard and played hard and wasn't afraid to push the boundaries." The character has often been referred to as a "maverick", with editorials also mentioning his "heavy-drinking" tendencies. Edmondson has described his alter-ego as "a great character - he's a maverick and can do things the others would not be able to get away with.", while the Daily Mirror have discussed the personality trait whereby "Abra finds it hard to conform to bureaucracy and is a risk taker. He is not afraid to fight for what he believes in - which, inevitably, lands him in all sorts of trouble."

The character's return in April 2008 saw drastic changes to his personality. Edmondson attested that Abra returned in "a fragile state" following a traumatic incident in the Congo, and had become "genuinely horrible". He said of the transformation: "He's not as humorous as he used to be. I used to like that, that sardonic wit that he used to have and it's kind of gone out of the window. But you can be quite funny when you're feeling everything's pointless. He does some things that are so cruel and cold that they're actually quite funny."

=== Early appearances ===
Abra first appeared in episode "Tuesday's Child" as an ex-pat colleague of longstanding character Ric Griffin, now living in Ghana. The storyline saw Ric eventually decide to return to Holby, leaving both Abra and Ghana behind. Abra returned to the show later in the series, in episode "Great Expectations", when he accompanied an African patient to the UK for an operation. He displayed his maverick tendencies by transplanting a third-hand heart, despite having been expressly forbidden to do so by the hospital chairman, Michael Beauchamp (Anthony Calf). He also proved instrumental in convincing recently demoted Matron Lisa Fox (Luisa Bradshaw-White) to leave Holby to practice medicine in Ghana. Bradshaw-White said of the storyline: "I'm pleased it's a positive ending for her as she's been so miserable!"

Abra returned again in episode "Prometheus Unbound", when his 'nephew' Kyle was brought into Holby for a live liver transplant. It was revealed that Abra was actually Kyle's father, and that he and Kyle's mother, Jenny, had brought the child up believing Abra to be his uncle, and his father to be Abra's fictitious brother Harry—supposedly a war hero living abroad with a family of his own. Discussing the storyline, Edmondson commented of his character: "Typically he has been drinking and hasn't warned Ric of his arrival. Abra tells Ric that the surgeon lined up to carry out the op has pulled out. He wants Ric to do it." Abra proved able to convince Ric to go ahead with the operation, even talking him into allowing him to perform part of the surgery himself, despite being under the influence of alcohol. As Kyle recovered, Abra came close to admitting his paternity, however lost his nerve at the last minute and departed from the show once more, despite Jenny's confession that she still loved him.

The character returned on a more permanent basis from June 2006. Abra confessed to old friend Diane he had been run out of Ghana by the father of a woman he had a fling with. He was offered a permanent position at Holby by Christopher Sutherland, however this was almost immediately retracted when Abra defied new protocol by utilising the designated emergency theatre for a minor gall stone operation. Edmondson explained of the storyline: "Abra promises a patient he'll operate on her immediately, but the hospital rules say he can't book the operating theatre for the same day. So Abra decides to do it anyway. He has a knee-jerk reaction to any kind of authority." Initially this plot strand was set to crossover with Holby's sister show, Casualty, with Sutherland's role instead filled by Casualty manager Nathan Spence, however this was abandoned prior to broadcast. After clashing with colleague Nick Jordan in the following episode, "Invasion", Abra made a favourable impression on Lord Byrne, an old family friend. He then left Holby again briefly for a research project recommended by Lord Byrne.

It was revealed at this point that Edmondson would be returning as Abra for six months from the autumn. Series producer Emma Turner stated: "We are delighted that Adrian has agreed to come back. He made a huge impact in the few episodes that he was involved in and there are some explosive and controversial storylines in store for his character when he returns to film with us."

=== Xenotransplantation; anti-retrovirals ===
Abra arrived back in Holby towards the end of series 8, immediately becoming embroiled in an illegal porcine kidney transplantation on renal patient Pete Golding. When Ric discovered what he had done, the deception strained their friendship, and Abra came close to losing his job. Eventually, Ric decided the pressure of covering up their misdoing was too great to bear, and after making up with Abra, departed once more for Africa on sabbatical.

Kyla and Abra prior to his departure

Around this time, Abra began a relationship with Acting Sister Kyla Tyson. When Ric departed for Uganda, Abra confessed the xenotransplantation secret to Kyla, who helped cover for him upon the arrival of new General Surgical Consultant Daniel Clifford. It was revealed that Abra had been stealing returned anti-retroviral drugs from the hospital pharmacy to ship to African countries in need for some weeks. When Kyla discovered a small supply in his desk drawer, she assumed he was HIV positive, and after failing to extract a confession from Abra, terminated their relationship. The misunderstanding was resolved several episodes later, when Abra was able to win her back by serenading her in a grand romantic gesture in the hospital car park.

Soon after, the investigation into the suspected corruption within the General Surgical department was stepped up. After some weeks of intense investigation, Clifford managed extract a confession from Abra. He revealed an admiration for Abra's maverick ways, and instead of turning him in, instructed Abra to leave Holby immediately with his record intact. Abra penned a post-it note bearing a brief message of goodbye to Kyla, and fled the country, leaving her devastated.

=== Night operations ===
Abra returned yet again to Holby in episode "The Human Jungle". Initially, Kyla was furious with him, and resisted his attempts to win her back—blaming him for the death of her ex-husband, which occurred in his absence and resulted in her son being taken into foster care. However, Abra persisted, and was able to convince her to resume their relationship, and move in with him. Ayola said of the relationship at the time: "It's love! Well, she loves him but I think he loves moving around the world more. He's a drifter. I wouldn't put any money on a happy ending for them. He's such a rolling stone and she's so emotionally wrong that I don't think it's going to work. On the plus side, I think this pair probably have a fantastic sex life and a great time down the pub."

It was revealed that his return to Holby was part of a deal made with hospital manager, Christopher Sutherland. Abra had agreed to turn around the hospital's struggling Acute Assessment Unit, and in return, Sutherland would allow him to use the hospital's theatres at night to operate on African children through a charity scheme Abra was involved in. The plan fell through when Sutherland was fired after the Board of Directors took a vote of no confidence in him. He was replaced by Jayne Grayson, who refused Abra's proposal, citing budget constraints.

Abra, aided by a returned Ric, decided to go ahead with the operations anyway, and secured the use of Kellar theatre at night from Clifford. However, events come to a head when they received a charity patient in episode "Duty of Care" chaperoned by Abra's father, Cecil. Having previously told Kyla his father was dead, Abra attempted to hide his identity from her, but she was furious to discover the truth. He placated her briefly, but was so worried when his father collapsed with ill-health that he ruined a social services meeting to decide whether her son may be returned from foster care. They rowed bitterly, and soon thereafter Abra's father died. He decided to take over the running of the charity in his father's place, and once more departed from Holby, again leaving Kyla behind. When asked whether the two characters would ever get back together, following Abra's second abandonment, Ayola responded: "He treated Kyla like dirt, so I don't know if she'll forgive him, but I love working with Ade – he's a gorgeous man."

=== Post-traumatic stress ===
It was announced on 7 November 2007 that Abra would again be returning to Holby City, in spring 2008. Edmondson revealed that "Abra comes back as a patient because some trauma has happened in Africa and he will be sponging off Ric." Expanding on this, he explained: "Abra's in a very fragile state, as he's suffering from post-traumatic stress. He keeps hurting himself, but no one knows why. Ric's pretty off with Abra at first, but he agrees to let him stay at his place for a week. Abra used to be a nice guy, but he's horrible now. Something happened to him on his travels, though even I haven't been told what it is yet. What I do know is that Abra has a huge machete scar on his back... I imagine he's been through some horror." He has stated that this appearance in the show will last four or five months, and that he doesn't yet know how the character will be written out this time, beyond there being "some kind of mental-health issue." It emerged that Abra had borne witness to a violent attack on the hospital he was working in the Congo, eventually leading to him checking into a psychiatric unit. After being discovered being treated by his own mother, Kyla and Lola Griffin convinced him to discharge himself and return to Ghana. He returned briefly to Holby in December 2008, when he convinced Kyla to move to Ghana with him, proposing marriage to her.

== Reception ==
The light-hearted, comedic quality the character of Abra brought to Holby City was a focal point of early reviews. Daily Mirror TV critic Jane Simon wrote of Abra's second Holby appearance:

The laughing gas has been in desperately short supply at Holby of late. [...] What they really need is for someone to come along and prove that heart transplants can be fun. It's a job for comedy cardiac specialist Percy Durant (guest star Ade Edmondson), who we last saw working out in Ghana with consultant Ric. You could easily imagine Percy driving around in a van with a big, red, plastic heart on top of it, or cracking open someone's chest and pulling out a bunch of flowers. And when it comes to Lisa (Luisa Bradshaw-White), he magically comes up with the answer to all her problems.

This particular episode garnered 7.4 million viewers and a 33 percent audience share, with both The Guardian and Digital Spy mentioning Edmondson's guest-appearance as Abra as a decisive factor in the high rating.

In early 2006, the character's "wacky" personality was deemed to have "proved such a hit, that Holby bosses got him back for two more episodes, shown in September and December (2005). And now they want to make Abra a permanent fixture in the show." Series producer Emma Turner said at the time that "(Abra) made a huge impact in the few episodes that he was involved in" and expressed her delight that Edmondson had agreed to reprise the role. TV critic Jim Shelley satirised the unrealistic storyline given to the character upon his return, deeming Abra's line "Essentially, it's an experiment and illegal." when explaining to the sister of a patient that he intended to transplant a pig's kidney into her brother's body, his televisual 'Bad news of the week'. However, Digital Spy's Dek Hogan was more positive about the plot strand, and especially the role of Abra therein, stating: "It's been a cracking take this, another example of the excellent form that medical drama has been in this year, thanks in no small part to Adrian Edmondson marvellous turn as maverick surgeon Abra."

Jim Shelley again commented on the outlandishness of the character's storylines following Abra's next return to the show, in 2007. He wrote: "Ric and Ade Edmondson had been conducting secret operations on orphans smuggled in from Africa (as you do). [...] It's TV crack—instant, mind-altering, utterly addictive." He also dubbed the line "I don't know why people complain about the NHS." his 'Naive statement of the week', with the explanation: "Hmmmm let's see. Abra covering up that he was operating on his arms-dealer father. Maddy hiding the fact she killed her junkie sister's daughter. And secret cokehead Jesus Of Nazareth (Robert Powell) keeping quiet about counselling Elliot's son for heroin addiction. Oh yeah, and in Casualty, in Holby's A&E department, nurse Ruth Winters secretly fixed her dad's breathalyser test. Anyone detect a theme emerging?"

Abra proved a popular character amongst fans of the show, and in the 2007 official fans awards, was voted fifth favourite male character of series 9, and his relationship with Kyla voted fifth favourite coupling of the series. When Edmondson took time out from Holby City to work on his ITV sitcom Teenage Kicks, Mark Wright of The Stage reviewed the show poorly, urging him to "go back to Holby City, you were good in that". Announcing that the role of Abra was indeed going to be reprised a sixth time, the Mirror described his return storyline as "sizzling".
