= Jim Shelley (TV critic) =

British television critic

Jim Shelley (birth name James Finch) is a British television and entertainment critic.

From 1993 to 2000, Shelley wrote as a freelance writer for The Guardian's supplemental section The Guide. His television criticism work initially appeared as a column under the alias of "Tapehead". These were considered surrealistic reviews of current television, similar to the work of Victor Lewis-Smith and Charlie Brooker. He later worked specifically on soap operas under "Soaphead". He also wrote for The Mail on Sunday's "Night on Day" section on soaps.

In 2001, with the departure of Charlie Catchpole from the Daily Mirror to the Daily Express, Shelley became the new television critic for the Mirror. He continued to write for the Mirror under its "Shelley Vision" column until 2011. In 2012, he was shortlisted for the critic of the year award at The Press Awards. Since 2013, he writes as a television review columnist for the Daily Mail.

In addition, Shelley has written for magazines such as Esquire, Details and BLITZ and was featured in NME.

His collection of Tapehead columns was published as Interference: Tapehead vs. Television by Atlantic Books in 2001.
