= Tony McHale =

British actor and director

Tony McHale (born Anthony John Wright in Bradford, West Riding of Yorkshire) is a British actor, writer, director, and producer. He appeared in Coronation Street and worked as a performer on Game for a Laugh and Beadle's About. He trained at Rose Bruford College.

McHale worked on the BBC soap opera EastEnders as a writer, story consultant, and director from its early years through the mid-1990s. He later co-created the BBC medical drama Holby City and served as its executive producer and showrunner from 2007 to 2010.

== Early life ==
McHale was born Anthony John Wright in Wibsey, a suburb of Bradford, West Yorkshire. His father, Gordon Wright, was a police officer and road-safety specialist who was appointed a Member of the Order of the British Empire (MBE), and his mother, Madeline Wright, was a schoolteacher.

At the age of fifteen, McHale joined the West Riding Youth Theatre, where he appeared in productions including The Crucible, Oedipus Rex, and The Apprentices. In 1969, he enrolled at Rose Bruford College in Sidcup to study drama.

== Early career ==
After graduating from Rose Bruford College in 1972, McHale began his acting career with the Q20 Theatre Company in Bradford and later performed with the Chesterfield Civic Theatre. He also appeared in the films That'll Be the Day (1973) and A Bridge Too Far (1977).

During the 1970s and 1980s, McHale appeared in television programmes including The New Avengers, Play for Today, Terry and June, and Coronation Street. In 1982, he began appearing in hidden-camera segments for Game for a Laugh and later continued in a similar role on Beadle's About, remaining with the programme until 1996.

== Writing and TV career ==
McHale began his writing career in radio, with his play Get It Off Your Chest commissioned by BBC Radio 4. He subsequently wrote several other radio dramas, including No Get Out Clause, Son from Soho, and Still Life.

In 1984, he joined the development team of EastEnders and became one of the programme's regular writers following its launch in 1985. He later worked as a storyliner, story consultant, and director on the series, and was the first writer to complete 100 episodes.

McHale subsequently wrote for a number of British television dramas, including Boon, The Bill, Casualty, Dangerfield, Silent Witness, Waking the Dead, Dalziel and Pascoe, and Trial & Retribution.

In 1998, McHale and Mal Young co-created Holby City, a spin-off of Casualty. McHale wrote the programme's first episode and later returned as story consultant before serving as executive producer from 2007 to 2010.

== Personal life ==
McHale married Janet Logan. They had two children, Mathew Anthony and Sally Jane.
