= Holby City series 12 =

Holby City
- Series 12
- No. of episodes: 55

Release
- Original network: BBC One
- Original release: 20 October 2009 – 12 October 2010

Series chronology
- ← Previous; Series 11 Next → Series 13

The twelfth series of the British medical drama television series Holby City commenced airing in the United Kingdom on BBC One on 20 October 2009. The series deals with the repercussions of the death of ward sister Faye Byrne's son Archie, including the resignation of consultant Connie Beauchamp and the return of former registrar Thandie Abebe-Griffin. It also focuses on staff members' romantic and family lives. F1 Oliver Valentine becomes romantically involved with registrar Jac Naylor and ward sister Daisha Anderson, and his sister Penny embarks on a secret romance with a heart transplant patient. Consultant Linden Cullen is reunited with his estranged daughter Holly, nurse Donna Jackson decides to adopt her half-niece Mia, sister Chrissie Williams gives birth to a son, Daniel, and Faye becomes pregnant by her estranged husband Joseph. The series includes a crossover episode with sister show Casualty and it also has the highest number of episodes to date, as the series contains a small number of episodes which air during the same week.

The series began with 15 roles receiving star billing. Executive producer Tony McHale and actresses Rebecca Grant and Phoebe Thomas announced their intentions to leave the show during the course of the year. Actresses Leslie Ash, Amanda Mealing and Tina Hobley took several-month breaks from filming, and actresses Ginny Holder and Anna-Louise Plowman reprised their roles as Thandie Abebe-Griffin and Annalese Carson respectively. The series received mixed to negative reviews from critics. It was criticised as presenting an inaccurate portrayal of real hospital life, and deemed a soap opera rather than a drama series by former Holby City writer Peter Jukes. It attained strong ratings, however, and was regularly the most-watched show in the 8 pm Tuesday timeslot, frequently drawing a quarter of the audience share.

== Episodes ==
No. overall	No. in series	Title	Directed by	Written by	Original release date	Viewers (millions)
473	1	"The Hands That Rock the Cradle, Part 1"	Christopher King	Tony McHale	20 October 2009	5.45
Faye (Patsy Kensit Healy) struggles to cope when her son Archie (Conor Cremin) is admitted to the hospital having swallowed a whistle. Connie (Amanda Mealing) operates on Archie successfully, but his nurse, Lauren Minster (Riann Steele), causes further problems by mistakenly injecting him with the wrong drug. Michael's (Hari Dhillon) professionalism is compromised when Connie is left without a patient for the launch of her robotics suite. Mark (Robert Powell) falls out with the new clinical matron, Judith Marchant (Shelagh McLeod), when Maddy's (Nadine Lewington) suspected murderer Chantelle (Toyah Frantzen) is admitted to AAU. Maria (Phoebe Thomas) struggles to treat her, desiring justice for Maddy's death.
474	2	"The Hands That Rock the Cradle, Part 2"	Christopher King	Tony McHale	21 October 2009	5.51
Archie dies following his recent surgery, and Lauren blames Faye for changing his saline bag without permission. Joseph (Luke Roberts) attempts to help Faye by persuading Connie and Ric (Hugh Quarshie) to say they signed off on the bag change. CEO Vanessa Lytton (Leslie Ash) does not believe them and suspends Faye, sending Connie and Ric on leave pending an investigation. Michael takes the credit for Connie's successful robotics launch, and Donna (Jaye Jacobs) unsuccessfully tries to set Oliver (James Anderson) and Daisha (Rebecca Grant) up. Mark and Maria persuade Chantelle to confess to Maddy's murder.
475	3	"Myself, Coming Back"	Robert Del Maestro	Nick Warburton	27 October 2009	5.86
Donna deals with her father's effects following his recent death, and finds a letter asking her to visit his friend Patti (Barbara Drennan). Donna and Maria take a road-trip to visit her, and find Patti collapsed and the child she is caring for on the verge of being taken into foster care. Donna learns that the child is her half niece, Mia, and Patti asks her to consider taking care of her. Joseph compromises his professionalism by confronting Lauren over Faye's suspension against Michael's advice. Judith's new infection-control measures are a failure, and she comes to appreciate Mark when he saves the day for her.
476	4	"The Professionals"	Daikin Marsh	Martha Hillier	3 November 2009	5.77
Elliot (Paul Bradley) struggles to run Darwin in Connie's absence. He feels ill, and is forced to leave theatre mid-way through an operation as a result of the pain. Penny (Emma Catherwood) discovers he is suffering from angina. Joseph becomes acting-consultant, and attends Archie's funeral with Faye and her mother (Deborah Grant). Vanessa appoints Thandie Abebe-Griffin (Ginny Holder) as Darwin ward's new locum surgical registrar. Jac (Rosie Marcel) acts up as consultant general surgeon on Keller. Judith's personal life impinges on her professionalism, and she confides in Mark that she is going through an acrimonious divorce. Maria returns to work following her back surgery, and struggles with Donna's lax attitude. A patient makes a complaint about Maria's lack of commitment, but Judith supports her in her need for frequent breaks.
477	5	"Home Truths"	Daikin Marsh	Dana Fainaru	10 November 2009	5.98
Linden (Duncan Pow) avoids his estranged daughter Holly (Charlotte Wakefield) when she visits her mother's grave. His mother-in-law later arrives at the hospital and tells him that Holly has dropped out of college and run away with her boyfriend. Linden realises that he is ready to be a father again, and accepts Holly back into his life. Oliver comes to respect Jac's medical skills when she correctly diagnoses and treats a patient with a mystery illness. Penny enjoys working with Thandie after performing a successful procedure and being encouraged by her, and suggests that Elliot relinquishes his animosity gives her a second chance.
478	6	"To Have and to Hold"	David Innes Edwards	David Lawrence	17 November 2009	5.78
Joseph illegally acquires the toxicology report on Archie's death, hoping to exonerate Faye. A patient becomes seriously ill in his absence, requiring Elliot to step in. Joseph is forced to admit culpability and help Elliot with another patient in order to prove himself. Chrissie (Tina Hobley) makes an effort to get along with Judith, but is furious when she discovers she has jeopardised Mark's job by recommending him for redundancy. Judith claims the recommendation was a mistake, but Chrissie's animosity remains. Oliver tries to prove his capability to Jac. Though he accepts help from Daisha, he impresses Jac with his performance.
479	7	"Break Away"	David Innes Edwards	David Lawrence	24 November 2009	5.76
Penny tries to prove to Elliot that she is good with patients, however becomes overly involved in the case of a new cardiothoracic patient, Scott (Joshua Bowman). Elliot is not impressed when he sees Penny admonish Scott's girlfriend for breaking up with him, but Penny is unapologetic. Jac and Oliver work together again, and Oliver is pleased when he spots a vital detail Jac has overlooked. Jac later overhears him boasting about his success, but to Oliver's surprise, does not reprimand him. Holly begins working in the hospital as a healthcare assistant. Donna attempts to help her along, but causes tension between them by asking probing questions about her parents.
480	8	"And That's What Really Hurts"	Rob Evans	Justin Young	1 December 2009	4.60
Joseph tries to convince the police and Vanessa that Archie was killed by a potassium overdose. He makes a serious error at work, which Elliot initially blames on Thandie. When Elliot uncovers the truth, his begins to lose confidence in Joseph's professionalism and suitability for consultancy. Judith attempts to soothe her strained relationship with Chrissie, but only makes things worse with her approach to infection control. Oliver passes over the opportunity to assist in an operation which he needs to complete an assessment, in favour of spending time with an upset Daisha.
481	9	"Now We Are Lonely"	Rob Evans	Andrew Holden	8 December 2009	5.43
Joseph is accused of bullying when he suggests Lauren is responsible for Archie's death. Vanessa threatens him with suspension, but Lauren begins to suspect that she may in fact be at fault. Vanessa lets Michael down by hiring a locum unqualified in robotic surgery, causing Michael lose both his robotics suite and his faith in Vanessa. Penny hopes to make a good impression on the Acute Assessment Unit, is distracted from her work and neglects her duties when Scott is re-admitted.
482	10	"Too Close for Comfort"	Dominic Keavey	Sonali Bhattacharyya	15 December 2009	5.34
Mark supports Judith when her teenage son Connor is admitted to the hospital with alcohol poisoning. Holly mistakenly calls Judith's estranged husband Paul, and the pair argue. Mark helps them to come to an uneasy truce, but acknowledges that he might have feelings for Judith. Elliot accuses Penny of being too close to Scott, and when she ignores another patient to spend time with him, she comes to realise that he is right. Maria aims to impress Daisha and take a course to become a senior nurse. She is disappointed with Donna when she turns up to work hungover and lets her down on the ward, and begins to question their friendship.
483	11	"Stand by Me"	Jamie Annett	Tony McHale	22 December 2009	5.32
Linden and Holly's Christmas is strained by his guilt over her mother's death. Donna reunites a terminally ill mother with her daughter, Michael discharges all his patients for the holiday, Daisha becomes closer to Oliver and Chrissie announces that she is pregnant. The staff gather for a karaoke singalong.
484	12	"Resolutions"	Dominic Keavey	Chris Murray	29 December 2009	5.70
Faye is charged with Archie's murder, and Lauren confesses her guilt to Thandie, who tells Joseph. Vanessa calls the police and has Lauren arrested. Oliver chooses work over partying, and shares a locker room kiss with Jac.
485	13	"Talk to Me"	Mark Walker	Graham Mitchell	5 January 2010	6.77
Faye throws herself into her work, and confronts Lauren over Archie's death. Ric returns after his suspension, and clashes with Jac when she undermines him in theatre, causing him to block her promotion. Michael reveals that Connie has resigned, and Chrissie runs into the father of her baby, who is working as a locum at the hospital.
486	14	"A Glorious Reunion"	Mark Walker	Graham Mitchell	12 January 2010	6.36
Faye stops blaming Lauren for Archie's death after the nurse attempts suicide. Ric proposes a vote of no confidence against Vanessa over her handling of the Archie incident, but she instead dismisses Judith as a scapegoat. Oliver learns that photos of his kiss with Jac have been posted all over the hospital, and tries to hide them from Daisha.
487	15	"Stop All the Clocks"	Robert Bierman	Rebecca Wojciechowski	19 January 2010	5.98
Linden tries to help Faye through the loss of her son. Thandie attempts to persuade Ric to give her a second chance, but Ric believes she has not changed when she mishandles a case. Maria runs Darwin in Faye's absence, and is reminded that some things are more importance than being perfect.
488	16	"Promises"	Robert Bierman	Joe Ainsworth	27 January 2010	5.10
Donna's half-niece Mia arrives at the hospital with her grandmother Patti, who suffers a stroke. When Patti dies, Donna decides to adopt Mia. Jac offers to support Joseph, whose relationship with Faye is struggling, but she also wants his consultancy for herself. Maria is enamoured by the new locum George Kerwin (Joseph May), who tries hard to impress Chrissie after turning up late on his first day.
489	17	"...And The Devil Makes Three"	Paul Gibson	Tom Bidwell	2 February 2010	5.92
Ric tries to befriend the hospital chairman Terence Cunningham (Roger Barclay), to ensure that Thandie will not be re-hired at the end of her contract. Thandie, however, impresses Cunningham, and he supports her application for a permanent position. Penny faces an ethical dilemma over organ donation, and Holly causes trouble on the wards.
490	18	"Too Cold to Crash and Burn"	Paul Gibson	Al Smith	9 February 2010	6.38
Penny accidentally reveals her secret relationship with Scott on the day of his heart transplant. Elliot holds her back a rotation, and tells her to choose between Scott and her career. When Oliver lets Jac down, she shouts at Penny, ruining her chance to showcase her teaching skills to Michael. A patient causes Maria to believe George is cheating on her, but she realises after confronting him that the patient was lying.
491	19	"Downstairs, Upstairs"	Michael Buffong	Mark Catley	15 February 2010	6.68
In a crossover with Casualty beginning in "Love is a Battlefield", Elliot attends to the emergency department's Charlie Fairhead (Derek Thompson), who has had a heart attack. Elliot disagrees with Nick Jordan (Michael French) over Charlie's treatment, endangering his own health in the process. Thandie fools the Home Office into believing that she and Ric are a couple to avoid potential deportation. Ric is reminded of why he first fell in love with her, and they kiss. Nurse Nicky Van Barr (Alan Morrissey) attempts to impress Maria, but attracts attention from George.
492	20	"Together Alone"	Daikin Marsh	Dan Sefton	17 February 2010	5.75
Michael finds Connie working at a private hospital in London, and attempts to convince her to return to Holby. Toby Geddes (Rick Warden) assumes a consultancy position on Darwin and annoys Elliot, who also travels to London to try to persuade Connie, however she refuses unless Vanessa leaves. Penny's confidence is knocked when she clashes with night shift nurse Frieda Petrenko. Scott asks Penny to move to Spain with him. She agrees, but when Oliver interferes, Scott leaves alone, not wanting Penny to give up her career for him. First Appearance of Greg Douglas.
493	21	"Amare"	Michael Buffong	Sebastian Baczkiewicz	22 February 2010	6.50
Thandie and Ric's renewed relationship is going well, when Thandie's brother Moses arrives at the hospital. He has AIDS and only days left to live, and asks Thandie to help him die. She eventually agrees, but the decision brings about the end of her marriage to Ric, and she leaves Holby. Maria asks George to meet her parents, but he refuses, and admits to Nicky he is bisexual. Maria realises he is not serious about their relationship and breaks up with him. Joseph invites Faye on holiday, but she declines.
494	22	"The Butterfly Effect – Part 1"	Dominic Keavey	Justin Young	2 March 2010	6.31
Following a fight between Faye and Joseph, Faye is comforted by Linden and the two share a kiss. Victims of a hostage situation in the city are admitted to the hospital, and Faye fears for Joseph after finding his tie on a patient. It transpires that Joseph is fine, but Daisha has been shot. Elliot falls out with Toby in theatre and later writes his letter of resignation. Penny and Oliver attempt to use the hostage emergency to advance their careers.
495	23	"The Butterfly Effect – Part 2"	Dominic Keavey	Justin Young	9 March 2010	5.84
The hostage crisis is seen from Joseph and Daisha's perspective. The incident highlights Vanessa's poor management skills and forces Michael to prove himself as Director of Surgery by bringing Connie back to the hospital. As a result of Connie's return and the departure of Geddes, Elliot retracts his resignation.
496	24	"Faith No More"	Robert Bierman	Andrew Holden	15 March 2010	6.01
Faye ends her relationship with Joseph, who violently assaults Linden. Mark encourages Daisha to stay in Holby following her shooting. Judith breaks up with him, doubting his commitment to her and hurt by his closeness to Daisha. Michael realises that new consultant Sacha Levy (Bob Barrett) is the father of Chrissie's baby.
497	25	"Tipping Point"	Robert Bierman	Abi Bown	22 March 2010	6.00
Daisha leaves Holby to return to the Philippines. As a result of her back injury, Maria is sent home by Vanessa, and Mark begins a compensation claim against the hospital Trust on Maria's behalf. Joseph announces that Faye has left him for Linden, but Linden experiences doubts and puts their relationship on hold. Penny and Oliver work together on Darwin, where Connie realises that Penny is a better doctor than her brother. Final Appearance of Daisha Anderson.
498	26	"Enemies Closer"	Christopher King	Paul Mari	30 March 2010	5.78
Jac's estranged mother Paula (Julie Legrand) arrives at the hospital in need of a kidney transplant. After arriving late for work, Oliver submits Penny's research as his own in an attempt to impress Connie and Elliot, but is witnessed by new nurse Roberta (Emily Lawrance). Vanessa threatens Maria's job should she pursue her compensation claim, causing her to withdraw it. In protest of Vanessa's actions, Mark resigns.
499	27	"For the Greater Good"	Christopher King	Nick Warburton	6 April 2010	5.42
Following Mark's resignation, Michael calls an emergency board meeting about Vanessa's competence. She humiliates him in front of the hospital board, before leaving for a new job. Joseph apologises to Linden and allows Faye to move back in with him. After an argument with her, he sleeps with one of his patient's relatives. Oliver attempts to work hungover, and is annoyed by Sacha. Final Appearance of Vanessa Lytton.
500	28	"Bette Davis Eyes"	David Innes Edwards	Dan Sefton	12 April 2010	5.97
When Paula's condition deteriorates, Jac offers to be a kidney donor. Chrissie goes into early labour and gives birth to a son, finally admitting to Mark that Sacha is the father. Faye is upset by a letter requesting that she choose an inscription for Archie's gravestone.
501	29	"X-Y Factor"	David Innes Edwards	Nick Fisher	19 April 2010	6.00
Chrissie meets Sacha's two daughters and his mother Esther (Carol Macready). When Esther begins discussing wedding plans, Chrissie tells Sacha that he will always be in his son's life, but that she does not want them to be a family. Jac and Paula's kidney transplant goes ahead on Jac's birthday. Despite complications during Paula's surgery, the transplant is a success, and mother and daughter celebrate Jac's birthday together. Michael is dismayed when Cunningham suggests that he split Director of Surgery responsibilities with Connie, and requests to work with Ric instead.
502	30	"What Goes Around"	Rob Evans	Al Smith	25 April 2010	5.92
When Paula goes missing from Jac's home, Jac discovers she has left to stay with her grandfather and half-sister. She realises her mother has conned her into the transplant, and cuts her family out of her life. Faye discovers she is pregnant, and is unsure whether to tell Linden or keep it a secret.
503	31	"Apply Some Pressure"	Mat King	Sally Abbott	3 May 2010	6.21
Mark impresses Cunningham by single-handedly resolving a porters strike, and the hospital chairman suggests that he applies for the CEO position. Hurt by not being included in Ric and Michael's job-share, Connie begins working on Joseph's research project, and encourages her old friend Elaine (Tilly Vosburgh) to take part. Michael is unhappy about deferring to Ric, but accepts the situation in an attempt to save his marriage.
504	32	"Take No Prisoners"	Mat King	Chris Murray	10 May 2010	4.57
Mark is reluctant to apply for the CEO post, disliking the politics involved. However, when he meets a patient who could significantly benefit from a new laser treatment, he decides to pursue the position. Oliver is promoted from F1 to F2, but has problems with Connie's trial patient, Elaine. Connie is furious with Oliver, who deflects blame by telling her Penny slept with a patient. Penny is subsequently transferred to work on AAU. Frieda joins AAU covering Chrissie's maternity leave. When Donna disappears for an entire day, Maria is forced to run the ward single-handedly. Although both nurses deny wanting to become ward sister, they change their minds and both submit an application for the position.
505	33	"Time and Tide – Part 1"	Daikin Marsh	Graham Mitchell	18 May 2010	5.69
A flash flood hits south west England, and the hospital is inundated with patients. The basement is at risk of flooding, and the mains power is cut off. The back-up generator fails while Connie and Joseph are operating on Elaine. Maria is offered the ward sister job, to Donna's dismay. The two get stuck in a lift together when the power fails, increasing the tension between them. Staff members discover that Terry, a patient admitted for taking an overdose of paracetamol, has previously downloaded child pornography. When the children in the hospital crèche are moved during the flood, Mia is separated from the group and noticed by Terry.
506	34	"Time and Tide – Part 2"	Daikin Marsh	Graham Mitchell	19 May 2010	4.95
Mark helps to resolve the hospital flooding crisis. When power is restored, acting CEO Davina concedes he is a worthy applicant for the job. Donna worries that Mia has been taken by Terry, but is relieved when she is found by Greg Douglas (Edward MacLiam), Connie's former registrar from The Trafalgar hospital. Maria realises how much the ward sister job means to Donna, and hands in her notice, intent on travelling to Tanzania. Connie explains to Elaine's partner Kevin that she may have permanent brain damage, due to oxygen deprivation during the power cut. Final Appearance of Maria Kendall.
507	35	"Brutally Frank"	Jamie Annett	Joe Ainsworth	24 May 2010	5.30
Mark faces challenges on his first day as CEO. Connie is upset when her friend and patient Elaine is diagnosed with brain damage and fears that Kevin may discover the truth about how she misled them. Donna faces competition on her first day as ward Sister due to the arrival of super-efficient new nurse Elizabeth. First Appearance of Elizabeth Tait.
508	36	"Taking Over"	Jamie Annett	Chris Murray	1 June 2010	4.28
New registrar, Greg Douglas arrives on Darwin ward and he immediately clashes with Elliot by giving conflicting information to his patient. Jac is determined to solve a complicated case by herself to show her abilities as a doctor, but may require some help from a friend.Faye is determined to keep the secret of her unborn child's paternity from Linden.
509	37	"Cross My Heart"	Edward Bazalgette	Dana Fainaru	7 June 2010	5.48
Joseph is sent to London with Greg so that they can collect a heart for a transplant patient. During the journey they find that they both rub each other up the wrong way. Elaine dies and Connie is determined to prove her amazing surgical abilities, despite her emotional state not being at its best. Final Appearance of Paul Rose.
510	38	"Thursday's Child"	Dominic Keavey	Sebastian Baczkiewicz	15 June 2010	4.89
Faye has a CVS test in secret in order to discover the sex of her baby. If it's a boy there's a 50% chance he'll have Lowe's syndrome, the thought of which terrifies Faye. Joseph is determined to be a part of his baby's life no matter what the case. Linden is not happy when he is left out of the decision making. Penny continues to refuse Oliver's attempts to make peace and they end up participating in a game of 'pass the patient' which angers their consultants. Michael and Annalese attempt at saving their marriage by going to see a counsellor but they end up having to save the life of their counsellor.
511	39	"Fool's Gold"	Dominic Keavey	Darren Guthrie	1 July 2010	5.05
Michael uses his work in order to distract himself from his private life. Later he is frustrated with a difficult patient and takes his anger out on Donna and Elizabeth. Elliot is determined not give up on young footballer Ben who needs his operation, with no more time for fundraising Elliothas to find someone to supply the laser equipment immediately. Penny is challenged by Linden to work with Frieda, making her extra determined to put aside their differences.
512	40	"Swimming With Sharks"	Steve Hughes	David Lawrence	6 July 2010	4.68
Mark finds himself dealing with a complaint against Sacha, which makes him suspicious about Sacha's past as a doctor. Penny decides to play Frieda at her own game when she shows her up yet again. Elliot is concerned when the laser he needs for surgery has not arrived.
513	41	"Secrets You Keep"	Steve Hughes	Abi Bown	13 July 2010	5.56
Linden is angry when he discover that everyone knows that Faye is pregnant; his anger then leads to his work suffering. Elliot finally performs laser surgery on Ben, but now has no choice but to reveal where he got the funding from. Concerned about Elizabeth's professional attitude both Sacha and Jac attempt to make her laugh, Jac however goes too far.
514	42	"All Cried Out"	Rob Evans	Graham Mitchell	20 July 2010	5.33
Michael refuses to accept the fact that Annalese wants a divorce. Michael then finds himself paranoid that Ric and Annalese might rekindle their affair and therefore competes with Ric to pitch for a 500,000 pound funding donation. Sacha is accused of sexual harassment by a patient. Jac however hopes to find out the truth behind the allegations. Elliot struggles with his new-found fame after receiving his OBE. Final Appearance of Keith Greene.
515	43	"Two in Five Marriages"	Rob Evans	Tony McHale	27 July 2010	5.48
Michael wants to boost his fragile ego, and aims to take Connie to the Summer Ball. Greg finds himself distracted by a group of sunbathing nurses, and leaves Oliver to handle a meeting with the chairman of the hospital.
516	44	"Dandelions"	Dermot Boyd	Stuart Morris	3 August 2010	5.27
Ric anxiously awaits the results of his scan, and finds himself in conflict with Michael over who should receive funding for a project at the hospital. Elliot has no choice but to reprimand Connie when she takes credit for Greg's work and takes over his case. Faye is concerned over her relationship with Linden and decides to ask Joseph for a divorce.
517	45	"Man With No Name"	Dermot Boyd	Martha Hillier	10 August 2010	5.41
Ric finds it hard to concentrate on his presentation for the Board. He asks Jac to manage a domino transplant for him. When she fails, will Ric be able to find a way to use this to his advantage? Connie appoints Greg to be Oliver's mentor. Greg is not happy about this and Oliver therefore attempt to win him round. Penny is forced to lie to save both her and Frieda when Freida treats a patient without having a doctor on the case.
518	46	"Skipping A Beat"	Daikin Marsh	Rebecca Wojciechowski	17 August 2010	5.49
Linden is over-joyed when Faye announces that she and Joseph are having a divorce mediation. Later he is, however, angry when he learns from Joseph that he had been named as the third party in their marriage breakup. Greg wants to coll his relationship with Connie so she decides to flirt with a top American surgeon visiting the hospital. Michael is distracted by his suspicions over Annalese and misses out on the opportunity to put his case to the board.
519	47	"Transgressions"	Daikin Marsh	Tahsin Güner	24 August 2010	5.05
Michael's one-night stand is rushed into Holby, having overdosed on cocaine. Ric decides he must do something about his own relationship with Annalese, as Michael is obviously distressed. Frieda decides to play a joke on an unpleasant racist patient, and in the process must begrudgingly accepts Penny's support.
520	48	"Til the Grave"	Dominic Keavey	Tim Price	25 August 2010	5.31
Michael wins the Trust's support to expand HolbyCare. After missing visitation with his children due to spending the previous evening taking cocaine, he pleads with Annalese to reconcile with him, but discovers that she has been dating Ric. While Michael operates on a patient, Ric finds the cocaine in their office and orders him out of theatre. Michael antagonises Ric over his relationship with his wife, prompting Ric to admit he has terminal cancer. Penny becomes an F2, but her day begins badly when several emergency patients are admitted and one dies. Joseph pushes Faye to make a pre-natal appointment. After she collapses in theatre and is diagnosed with fibroids, he convinces her to test for Lowes, promising that whatever the outcome, he will be a father to the baby.
521	49	"The Last Day of Summer"	Dominic Keavey	Justin Young	31 August 2010	5.70
Annalese asks Ric to explain why he broke up with her, but he refuses to divulge the truth about his cancer and tells her to go back to Michael. He gives Mark his resignation, but collapses in theatre while performing a final operation, requiring Michael to save him. Oliver over-stretches himself trying to prove his worth to Greg, and Connie is furious to discover that Greg left him unsupervised. After spending a shift in a futile attempt to achieve an empty ward, Jac accepts Sacha as a friend.
522	50	"Get Busy Living"	Michael Buffong	Joe Ainsworth	7 September 2010	5.60
Frieda challenges Penny over her diagnosis of a patient, and when the patient goes into crisis she saves his life. When later questioned by Penny, Frieda is forced to admit she trained as a doctor in Ukraine. Ric has survived surgery, but faces a long struggle with chemotherapy. Joseph is very happy that Faye has allowed him a place in their child's future. Lady Byrne however muscles in leading to Faye refusing any help from Joseph.
523	51	"A Failure To Communicate"	Michael Buffong	Joe Ainsworth	14 September 2010	5.54
Jac is over the moon when she is promoted to Acting Consultant on Keller, but she immediately clashes with Ric over a patient. Later she tells Ric he's past it, and is forced to publicly apologise to save her credibility with the team. Greg discovers that Oliver has told Connie that he is to blame him for his botched procedure gets his revenge when he discovers a patient's sexy relative is a high-class prostitute, and sets Oliver up on a date. Penny encourages Frieda's skills as a doctor, but Frieda is adamant to continue on as a nurse.
524	52	"Test Results"	Rob Evans	Rob Williams	21 September 2010	5.77
Linden returns from his religious retreat, and tries to avoid Faye and instead helps a doctor through her first shift on AAU who later hasthrows acid in her face by an angry patient. Connie struggles to prepare a presentation and a tricky patient procedure in order to get the job as Director of Surgery. Jac struggles settle in on Keller following her promotion, as the team are still angry over the way she treated Ric.
525	53	"Long Night's Journey Into Day"	Rob Evans	Dana Fainaru	28 September 2010	5.68
Affected by Ric moving in with Annalese, Michael risks the end of his career when he tries to illegally harvest one liver from a patient to another. Connie finds out and is livid with him. Joseph is angry when Connie leaves Greg in charge of Darwin. Frieda is happy on the night shift when a temp nurse who she used to work with arrives. They happily work together to nurse a group of elderly patients, until Frieda realises that the temp was illegally sedating the patients to quieten things down; leading to her having to sack him.
526	54	"Revelations"	David Innes Edwards	Graham Mitchell	5 October 2010	5.81
Linden tries to persuade Faye that AAU is too dangerous of a place for her to work in her condition. Oliver wants to prove he's a team player but ends up having to be bailed out by Frieda. After listening to Donna Sacha is worried that Jac fancies him.
527	55	"Misfit Love"	David Innes Edwards	Andrew Holden	12 October 2010	5.77
Linden discovers Faye's lies leading to a breakdown in their relationship. Despite his attempts to leave her, he can't help but try and save her when she is threatened by a drug addict. Michael is called into work on his day off to explain some figures he's lied about in his plans for Holbycare. When he realises that Ric is behind people scrutinising his proposal, he punches him and swiftly loses not only his pitch for Holbycare but also his Director of Surgery role. Frieda misreads the signals when Oliver invites her out for a drink to say thanks for bailing him out previously. Death of Linden Cullen.

== Production ==
=== Crew and scheduling ===
The series was produced by the BBC and aired on BBC One in the United Kingdom. In December 2009, executive producer and series co-creator Tony McHale announced his intention to stand down, after four years producing the show. McHale was the first British writer ever to become the showrunner of a major prime-time drama, and the BBC's controller of drama John Yorke praised him for his success. McHale stated: "I've had a terrific four years on Holby and am thrilled with what we've achieved. [...] I know the show will go on from strength to strength." McHale was succeeded as executive producer by Belinda Campbell, and as lead writer by Justin Young, who intends to introduce a more writer-led commissioning process from series thirteen onwards. Young aims for writers to create more of the theme and story of their episodes than was previously the case. The series featured a number of different directors and writers. Each director worked on at least two episodes, except Robert Del Maestro and Edward Bazalgette, who directed one episode each. Dominic Keavey was the series' most frequent director, working on eight episodes. Graham Mitchell was the series' most frequent writer, writing six episodes.

Holby City's twelfth series aired in the 8 pm timeslot on Tuesdays across the United Kingdom, except in Scotland, where the series has no fixed timeslot. As a result, several episodes originally aired on BBC Scotland before their broadcast in the rest of the United Kingdom. The episode "Take No Prisoners" originally aired on 10 May 2010 on BBC Scotland. In the rest of the United Kingdom, the episode was rescheduled from 11 to 12 May 2010 due to extended news coverage of the 2010 UK General Election, and the BBC received 83 complaints over the rescheduling. Episodes were repeated on BBC One on the Monday morning following their original broadcast.

=== Music ===
The series continued the technique of using musical montage or "songtage" segments in each episode, originally introduced by McHale as a means of modernising the programme. The opening episodes alone, "The Hands that Rock the Cradle" parts one and two, utilised "Ben's Song", "Answer", "Angel" and "Dirty Little Secret" by Sarah McLachlan, "Sweet About Me" by Gabriella Cilmi,"Can't Speak French" by Girls Aloud, "Don't Bring Me Down" by Sia, The Blue Danube by Johann Strauss II, "Golden Slippers" by Lester Bradley & Friends and "Svefn-g-englar" by Sigur Rós. Asked whether she felt songtages were appropriate for a serious drama show, series producer Diana Kyle responded: "Yes - sometimes. On a multi-strand series such as Holby, they are an excellent way of telling stories visually - a moment from each - to open or close an episode or create the passing of time in a concise way for the audience." Kris Green of entertainment and media website Digital Spy suggested that the number of songs used per episode could be "very jarring", to which Kyle replied: "We plan to use music carefully in the future - maybe 'songtages', as above - and sourced music within a scene, that is music actually playing in the scene itself, for example on a radio - but less incidental."

=== Crossovers ===
Series twelve included a crossover storyline with Holby City's sister show Casualty. Holby originally launched as a spin-off from Casualty in 1999, and the two dramas have occasionally crossed over in special episodes broadcast as Casualty@Holby City. A new set of crossover episodes written by Casualty's lead writer Mark Catley were planned for February 2010. In the event, however, the episodes which saw Casualty's Charlie Fairhead (Derek Thompson) operated on by Holby City's Elliot Hope (Paul Bradley) after suffering a heart attack were broadcast as regular Casualty and Holby City episodes, rather than under the Casualty@Holby City title. Casualty's series producer Oliver Kent commented that, while it is "fantastic" to be able to produce crossover episodes, they are logistically difficult, as Casualty is filmed in Bristol, while Holby City is filmed in Elstree. In June 2010, Kent announced that the two shows would crossover again in September, for the launch of Casualty's 25th series. He explained that Holby City's nurse Donna Jackson (Jaye Jacobs) would appear in the first episode of the new season of Casualty, at the bequest of Cately, who again wrote the episode. Kent deemed it unlikely that another Casualty@Holby City episode would be produced in the "foreseeable future", but hoped that characters from the two shows would begin to crossover two or three times a year.

=== 500th episode ===
On 13 April 2010, Holby City reached its 500th episode with "Bette Davis Eyes", in which Jac (Rosie Marcel) offers to donate a kidney to her mother, who abandoned her as a child, and Chrissie (Tina Hobley) gives birth to a son. Marcel stated that she was "really proud" of the storyline, and grateful for the opportunity to show a different side of her character, explaining: "Everybody always has had their family dragged into things on the show, apart from me. It's actually been five years since I started and now we're finally getting to meet Jac's family. It's exciting." Hobley also enjoyed her storyline, commenting that after Chrissie's first baby died and she then suffered a miscarriage, Chrissie was "due some happiness". Actress Amanda Mealing stated on the show reaching 500 episodes: "It's a huge achievement. Holby's always had a good, high standard and that's not easy thing to do when you're on every week for an hour. We're always pushing it and making it better, too. To still be around for the 500th episode is testament to the passion that we all have."

== Cast ==
=== Overview ===
The series began with 15 roles receiving star billing. Amanda Mealing portrayed Connie Beauchamp, a consultant on the cardiothoracic surgery ward, Darwin. Paul Bradley played Elliot Hope, also a cardiothoracic consultant, and Luke Roberts played Joseph Byrne, a registrar on Elliot's firm. Hari Dhillon played consultant general surgeon and Director of Surgery Michael Spence. Hugh Quarshie acted as Ric Griffin, also a consultant on the general surgery ward, Keller. Rosie Marcel portrayed Jac Naylor, a general surgical registrar. Emma Catherwood and James Anderson appeared as Penny and Oliver Valentine, siblings and F1 doctors. Duncan Pow played Linden Cullen, a consultant on the hospital's Acute Assessment Unit. Robert Powell played Mark Williams, the unit's consultant nurse, and Tina Hobley played his daughter, ward sister Chrissie Williams. Patsy Kensit and Rebecca Grant played ward sisters Faye Byrne and Daisha Anderson, and Jaye Jacobs and Phoebe Thomas played staff nurses Donna Jackson and Maria Kendall.

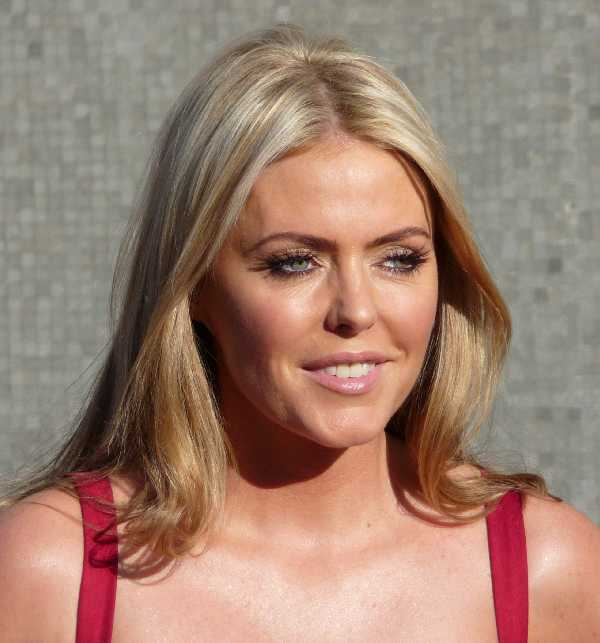
Patsy Kensit played ward sister Faye Byrne, but announced her intention to depart from the series in 2010.

Two actresses departed during the course of the series, with Grant leaving in March 2010, and Thomas departing during the summer. Kensit, Mealing and Roberts also resigned from the show during its twelfth series, however their characters will not depart until series thirteen. Prior to her resignation, Mealing took a three-month break from the show to spend time with her family and travel to Bangladesh. Hobley took four months maternity leave, which coincided with her character's own maternity leave, and actor Alex Macqueen left his recurring role of anaesthetist Keith Greene, having appeared in Holby City since 2005.

To compensate for the departing characters, several new characters joined the show during the course of the series. After appearing briefly as Chrissie's one-night stand, Bob Barrett became a main cast member playing locum consultant Sacha Levy. Meanwhile, having made a one off appearance as surgeon Greg Douglas in February 2010, Edward MacLiam joined the cast on a permanent basis from June 2010. Olga Fedori was promoted to the main cast as Frieda Petrenko, while La Charné Jolly was cast as eager new nurse Elizabeth Tait (Holby City). Actors are given the opportunity to shadow real doctors as preparation for their roles. MacLiam spent time with one of Holby City's medical advisors, and observed laparoscopic surgery being performed.

The series featured several recurring characters, and numerous guest stars. Ginny Holder reprised her role as Thandie Abebe-Griffin, Ric's wife who last appeared in the show's ninth series. Shelagh McLeod appeared as Judith Marchant, a clinical matron who began a relationship with Mark. Judith was written out of the series in January 2010, but McLeod felt things were left "open ended", suggesting there could be a happy ending for them. She briefly reprised her role in March 2010, as the relationship between Judith and Mark concluded. Leslie Ash played hospital CEO Vanessa Lytton. In December 2009, it was announced that Ash would take a several-month break from the series, returning later in 2010. In June 2010, Anna-Louise Plowman reprised her role as Annalese Carson, wife of Michael Spence. Joshua Bowman had a semi-recurring role, portraying cardiothoracic patient Scott James, who became romantically involved with Penny. Riann Steele appeared as nurse Lauren Minster, and Rick Warden played locum consultant Toby Geddes, described as "hugely irritating" by Scott Matthewman of The Stage. On 29 June 2010, Jane Asher announced that she would be reprising her recurring role as Lady Byrne, mother of Joseph, for a storyline involving Faye's pregnancy.

=== Main characters ===
- James Anderson as Oliver Valentine
- Bob Barrett as Sacha Levy (from episode 13)
- Paul Bradley as Elliot Hope
- Emma Catherwood as Penny Valentine
- Hari Dhillon as Michael Spence
- Olga Fedori as Frieda Petrenko (from episode 20)
- Rebecca Grant as Daisha Anderson (until episode 25)
- Tina Hobley as Chrissie Williams (until episode 29)
- Jaye Jacobs as Donna Jackson
- La Charné Jolly as Elizabeth Tait (from episode 35)
- Patsy Kensit as Faye Byrne
- Rosie Marcel as Jac Naylor
- Edward McLiam as Greg Douglas (from episode 20)
- Amanda Mealing as Connie Beauchamp
- Duncan Pow as Linden Cullen (until episode 55)
- Robert Powell as Mark Williams
- Hugh Quarshie as Ric Griffin
- Luke Roberts as Joseph Byrne
- Phoebe Thomas as Maria Kendall (until episode 34)

=== Recurring characters ===
- Leslie Ash as Vanessa Lytton (until episode 27)
- Roger Barclay as Terence Cunningham
- Ginny Holder as Thandie Abebe-Griffin (episodes 3−21)
- Andrew Lewis as Paul Rose (until episode 37)
- Alex Macqueen as Keith Greene (until episode 42)
- Niamh McGrady as Mary-Claire Carter
- Shelagh McLeod as Judith Marchant (episodes 1−24)
- Alan Morrissey as Nicky van Barr
- Anna-Louise Plowman as Annalese Carson (episodes 38−55)
- Riann Steele as Lauren Minster (until episode 14)

=== Guest characters ===
- Joseph May as George Kerwan (episodes 16−21)
- Charlotte Wakefield as Holly Cullen (episodes 5−30)
- Rick Warden as Toby Geddes (episodes 20−23)

== Reception ==
=== Critical response ===
Critical response to the series was mixed. Jane Simon of the Daily Mirror reviewed the opening episode positively, writing: "We should start a petition to get Holby's creator and exec producer Tony McHale back writing for the show more often, because when he turns in an episode like this one, it's a cracker." However, Simon commented in a later review that Holby is often "Depressing as hell". In October 2009, former Holby City writer Peter Jukes wrote a critical piece for Prospect magazine, contrasting Holby and Casualty negatively with the standard of American television dramas. Jukes wrote that Holby City has become a soap opera, rather than a drama. Tom Sutcliffe of The Independent reviewed a December 2009 episode poorly, finding it "astonishing" that any patients leave Holby General alive, as the staff are "so busy looking stricken or lovelorn at each other". Sutcliffe criticised the themes of "bedside relationship counselling" and "intercollegiate rivalry", and commented: "Anyone in search of a comedy masterclass should watch, but, you know, I don't think this is meant to be a spoof either." Janet Street-Porter, also of The Independent, felt that Holby City had "come to the end of [its] natural life" and should be cancelled.

In November 2009, Antony Sumara, CEO of the Mid Staffordshire NHS Foundation Hospital Trust, wrote a column criticizing Holby City and Casualty for misrepresenting real hospital life.

Andrew Billen of The Times reviewed the show's 500th episode, noting that he had lost interest in the series following the departure of Anton Meyer (George Irving) in 2002. He deemed the cast a "bizarre old mix", but concluded: "I could fall in love with this nonsense all over again."

=== Accolades ===
During series twelve, Holby City was nominated for the "Best Drama" award at the 2010 Inside Soap Awards, however lost to rival BBC One drama Waterloo Road. It was shortlisted in the "Best Television Continuing Drama" category at the 2010 Writers Guild of Great Britain Awards, with a group nomination for McHale, Young, Catley, Mitchell, Dana Fainaru, Martha Hillier, Chris Murray, David Lawrence, Veronica Henry, Peter Lloyd, Joe Ainsworth, Abi Bown, Andrew Holden, Ian Kershaw, Sebastian Baczkiewicz, Rob Williams, Al Smith, Claire Bennett, Jake Riddell, Nick Warburton, Sonali Bhattacharyya, Rebecca Wojciechowski, Tom Bidwell, Dan Sefton, Paul Mari, Nick Fisher and Sally Abbott. The series was longlisted for the "Best Drama" award at the 2010 National Television Awards, with "Best Drama Performance" nominations for Roberts and Marcel, and a "Best Newcomer" nomination for Fedori, who progressed to the shortlist. It was additionally nominated in the "Best Soap/Continuing Drama" category at the 2011 Broadcast Awards.

=== Ratings ===
The twelfth series of Holby City averaged 6.3 million viewers and a 23.1% audience share. The 1 December 2009 episode "And That's What Really Hurts" experienced a drop in ratings to 4.60 million, damaged by ITV airing an extra edition of the soap opera Coronation Street in the same timeslot, winning a 31% audience share and leaving Holby City with an 18% share. Heavy snowfall on 5 January 2010 led to a surge in TV viewing, and the Holby City episode "Talk to Me", which aired that night, received a higher than usual 6.8 million viewers. The series' lowest ratings occurred on 1 June 2010, when Holby City was watched by 3.81 million overnight viewers, adjusted up to 4.28 million in the weekly ratings. The episode, "Taking Over", aired against Britain's Got Talent on ITV, which attained 9.75 million viewers and a 39.2% audience share, leaving Holby City with a 15.1% audience share, down 40% on the channel's average audience share in the timeslot over the previous three months. Holby City was again down in the ratings on 6 July 2010, when the episode "Swimming With Sharks" aired against the first 2010 FIFA World Cup semi-final match on ITV. Holby attained 4.05 million viewers and a 16.9% audience share, while the football was watched by 7.92 million viewers, a 35.3% share.
