= Vanessa Lytton =

Fictional character

- Holby City character
- Leslie Ash as Vanessa Lytton
- First appearance: "The Spirit Dancing"; 13 October 2009
- Last appearance: "For the Greater Good"; 6 April 2010
- Created by: Tony McHale
- Portrayed by: Leslie Ash
- Spinoff(s): Casualty (2021)

In-universe information
- Occupation: Chief executive officer

Vanessa Lytton is a fictional character from the BBC medical drama Holby City, portrayed by actress Leslie Ash. The character first appeared on-screen on 13 October 2009 in the episode "The Spirit Dancing" - series eleven, episode fifty-two of the programme. Her role in the show is that of chief executive officer of the Holby City Hospital Primary Care Trust, making her the only regular character who is not a medic by profession. Vanessa was created by Holby City's executive producer Tony McHale as a replacement for former CEO Jayne Grayson (Stella Gonet). Ash was cast in the role after a five-year break from acting, due to complications arising from MSSA. As Ash is disabled, Vanessa walks with the aid of a walking stick. Ash has praised Holby City producers for their willingness to cast a disabled actress, though faced some media criticism for accepting the role, as she had previously received £5 million compensation for loss of earnings from the hospital at which she contracted MSSA. Vanessa is a "scheming", "conniving and calculated" executive, whose storylines have seen her clash with several members of the hospital's senior staff. In June 2021, it was announced that Ash would be reprising her role in Holby City's sister show Casualty.

== Creation ==
Vanessa was created in 2009 by Holby City's executive producer Tony McHale, as a replacement for former CEO Jayne Grayson (Stella Gonet), who departed from the show during its eleventh series. It was first announced on 18 May 2009 that actress Leslie Ash had been cast in the role, after a five-year break from acting due to complications arising from MSSA. Ash commented that the role was the first she had had to audition for since the age of nineteen, and although nervous: "I am so pleased and happy they've given me this chance. They are very brave to have taken on a disabled actress. I can't wait to be back on set. It's the last piece of the jigsaw in my recovery. I'm finally back to where I was." McHale commented: "We're thrilled to have Leslie join us at Holby. We know she's going to be a terrific asset to the show and her character will bring another dimension to our already strong cast. Her stories are going to have our viewers guessing all the way." Her first scenes were filmed in June 2009, for broadcast in October 2009. Asked how long she saw herself staying in Holby City, Ash replied: "At the moment I’m really happy, so as long as they want me! I want it to go well so I can stay on. Also, I know there are lots of women out there who love this show and I don’t want them to be disappointed. I want them to say, 'She looks great!'".

Ash was not a regular viewer of Holby City prior to her casting, but stated: "I'm actually quite surprised by the powerful women in the show and proud to be one. The scripts are brilliant and it’s very fast moving. It's a joy going to work every morning."

Ash sued Chelsea and Westminster NHS Trust for £5 million in damages for loss of earnings after contracting MSSA, arguing that her resulting disability meant she would never win leading TV roles again.

Considering her own experience, Ash felt that it was "ironic" to be playing a CEO, but commented that it made the role easier to play, as she had spent a lot of time on wards and dealing with hospital politics. She noted an initial reluctance to enter the hospital set, but found it helpful that she was already acquainted with co-stars Tina Hobley and Patsy Kensit Healy, as well as director Christopher King, who she worked with on ITV drama Where The Heart Is.

== Development ==
Vanessa is described by the BBC as "scheming", "conniving and calculated". Ash called the role a "meaty, hard part", explaining of her character: "She's not had to work her way to the top and people resent her for it. She's used her toughness all the way." As part of the character's costume, she wears black, thick-rimmed glasses. Due to Ash's disability, Vanessa uses a walking stick. Ash commented: "Disability is misrepresented on television and it's really fantastic that it did not worry the production team I was disabled." Of Vanessa's backstory, Ash explained: "She rose through the ranks from a nurse to become a CEO rather easily and we can only imagine that she’s done it by stepping over people along the way. But with a smile on her face." With regards to Vanessa's nursing background and the difference it made to her position, Ash explained: "They’re all so used to CEOs being very bureaucratic. I think it’s quite a shock to find someone who knows the medical side of things. They can’t get away with things, because she understands what’s going on."

Vanessa was introduced as an old friend of established character Michael Spence (Hari Dhillon), who helped her win the CEO position at Holby City Hospital in return for her helping him to deal with his rival Connie Beauchamp (Amanda Mealing). Ash commented: "Together I think her and Michael are going to whip the hospital up into a frenzy." She denied that Vanessa and Michael would be romantically involved, instead characterising their relationship as a case of "If you scratch my back, I’ll scratch yours", explaining: "[Michael] gets his own way rather more easily with Vanessa around, and in return he helps her." With regards to Vanessa's personal life, Ash divulged that she lives with a man who is unemployed, making Vanessa the main source of income in their relationship.

In June 2021, over 11 years after her final appearance on Holby City, Ash confirmed in an interview with OK! that she would be reprising her role as Vanessa on Holby City's sister show Casualty. Ash told the publication's Chloe Alexandrou that she was asked to return for one episode as a patient. She called it "a great little storyline". She later stated: "I'm thrilled to be joining the Casualty team for this episode and stepping back into Vanessa Lytton's shoes. It's been a few years since she graced the wards of Holby City hospital and I'm excited for viewers to see what's in store for her." Ash also said that she enjoyed working again, especially amidst the COVID-19 pandemic, and being reunited with Derek Thompson (Charlie Fairhead), whom she acted alongside in The Gentle Touch. Ash's return was announced shortly before the cancellation of Holby City was publicised. Lidia Molina-Whyte of the Radio Times thought that Vanessa may be one of many characters to cross shows. She confirmed that Ash would make her Casualty debut in summer 2021.

== Storylines ==
Vanessa arrives in Holby as the new chief executive officer of Holby City Hospital, replacing former CEO Jayne Grayson (Stella Gonet). She is recruited by Director of Surgery Michael Spence (Hari Dhillon), having previously worked with him when she was a nurse. Vanessa's first act as CEO is to approve funding for a robotics scheme run by cardiothoracic consultant Connie Beauchamp (Amanda Mealing). Soon thereafter, she suspends Connie, general surgical consultant Ric Griffin (Hugh Quarshie) and ward sister Faye Byrne (Patsy Kensit Healy) over the death of Archie Morton (Conor Cremin), Faye's disabled son, unaware that the true culprit in his death is nurse Lauren Minster (Riann Steele). Vanessa goes on to appoint former surgical registrar Thandie Abebe-Griffin (Ginny Holder) as a locum on the cardiothoracic ward, causing tension with consultant Elliot Hope (Paul Bradley), who Thandie once accused of racial discrimination.

== Reception ==
Ash's first episode as Vanessa was watched by 5.73 million viewers. It was selected as recommended viewing by the Daily Post and Daily Mirror, with The Mirror's Jane Simon commenting: "Ash looks terrific despite being lumbered with big owlish glasses just like the ones that Manda (Josie Lawrence) has to wear in EastEnders. This seems to be a new kind of wardrobe department shorthand for: 'You may remember me from shows that were popular in the 80s.'" Asked whether he was happy with the reception she had received, Tony McHale told Inside Soap: "I am, but we knew that there would be the odd headline that would have a dig at certain things. Viewers seem to have taken to her, though, and enjoy what she's doing on the show. It was a good idea not to bring Leslie in as a goody two-shoes type, I think - Vanessa is a very complex character." In November 2009, Antony Sumara, CEO of the Mid Staffordshire NHS Foundation Hospital Trust, wrote a column criticizing Holby City and its sister-show Casualty for misrepresenting real hospital life. Anne Pickles of the News and Star commented on the piece: "Holby always was close in nature to a cheap airport paperback page-turner. But it has become even more so with the arrival of Leslie Ash, who actually has the same job as Antony Sumara – though it's doubtful he has her trout pout or stiff, barking old sergeant major demeanour."
