= Daisha Anderson =

- Holby City character
- Rebecca Grant as Daisha Anderson
- First appearance: "Twelve Hour Nightmare"; 18 March 2008
- Last appearance: "Tipping Point"; 23 March 2010
- Portrayed by: Rebecca Grant

In-universe information
- Occupation: Ward sister; Staff nurse; Charity ambassador
- Children: Joe Anderson

Daisha Anderson is a fictional character from the BBC medical drama Holby City, played by actress Rebecca Grant. She first appeared in the series ten episode "Twelve Hour Nightmare", broadcast on 18 March 2008. Grant received the role after the show's producer watched her in a professional play and was impressed by her performance. The character is originally from the Philippines and has strong Filipino values. She is characterised as having a strong moral code and maintaining a forthright, assertive and straight-talking attitude. Daisha progresses from her role as staff nurse to ward sister and also becomes an ambassador for The Byrne Foundation. One of the characters first stories saw her dealing with an unwanted pregnancy. Having no home or money, Daisha feels unable to support a child. She tries to abort the baby with painkillers but is unsuccessful, gives birth in a lift and later gives up her child.

Most of Daisha's screen-time was shared alongside her close friend Mark Williams (Robert Powell). He would often organise her life and spend too much time worrying about her. Mark later develops feelings for Daisha, and due to their age difference other characters, especially Mark's daughter Chrissie Williams (Tina Hobley), voice their disapproval of their friendship. In 2010, Grant decided to leave the show to pursue other projects. Producers decided not to kill the character off but created a dramatic exit storyline. Daisha was held hostage, shot and her colleagues were forced to save her life. After she recovers Daisha decides to return to The Philippines and look after her son.

== Casting ==
Grant was starring in two professional plays and had always wanted to do television work. They received good reviews at a time Grant had done an audition for Holby City. A producer from the show went to watch the actress performing in her play "The Glass Cage". Impressed with Grant's performance they contacted her agent offering her the role of Daisha.

== Development ==
=== Characterisation ===
Daisha's a forthright and assertive Filipina with a highly tuned sense of right and wrong. She doesn't understand hierarchy or tact but is straightforward and honest and has a natural antenna when it comes to flirting.

— BBC Online.

Daisha has issues when it comes to punctuality. She has a love of karaoke singing and nail varnish. But the character is played as a straightforward professional who tells the truth despite lacking tactfulness. She also has good moral code of right and wrong. She is an assertive person who quickly rises through the ranks of Keller ward. Asked about Daisha's personality, Grant told Nicke Ames of Your Sandwich that "I'm half similar to Daisha as my mum is a Filipina, I adore tropical food, fruit and weather - and karaoke is, of course, a must.” Daisha herself is originally from the Philippines. One of Daisha's main reasons for working in the United Kingdom is to generate money and send it back home to her family. Grant's mother is Filipino and like Daisha left the country in her early twenties. But despite being brought up with British culture she learned a lot about "Filipino values". Grant said that she used these values to help her portrayal of Daisha.

=== Friendship with Mark Williams ===
When she arrives at Holby City hospital she quickly befriends Nursing consultant Mark Williams (Robert Powell). Grant said that she had formed a good rapport with Powell because they had shared so many scenes together. She called him a "warm and generous" actor to work alongside. Daisha is made homeless and Mark invites her to move into his flat as he has a spare room. Series producer Diana Kyle told Kris Green from Digital Spy that Mark "soon he finds he's taken on rather more responsibility than he expected." But Daisha really needs Mark's help and relies on his support. Executive producer Tony McHale added that the storyline would get "exciting" when Mark learns that Daisha is pregnant. The character "immediately goes into protective mode" and "treats her like a daughter". He oversees her progress through the pregnancy and supports her. But Mark begins to develop feelings for Daisha and some characters, especially his daughter ward sister Chrissie Williams (Tina Hobley) show their disapproval because they believe his feelings are "a little too strong." Mark is shocked when he finds an empty packet of pills in Daisha's locker and realises she is trying to abort her unborn child unethically.

Daisha gives birth to a son named Joe. The labour scenes take place in a lift at the hospital. A midwife was on-set to work with Grant and give her advice on how to play contractions and make it look convincing. But she does not bond with him her child. She cannot commit to having him in her future and does not think she will be able to support him. Grant told a reporter from the Nottingham Post that "you see that something's not right with Daisha's feelings towards the baby. Her family don't know, and she hasn't got enough money to look after the baby because she's sending all of her money back. She's going through the motions and she's not admitting to post-natal depression."

On the day she is supposed to place her baby into the adoption system, Daisha is absent from work. Mark worries that Daisha may be in trouble, recalling her attempt to overdose and abort her child. A writer from Female First reported that Mark would become so worried about Daisha he contacts the police to report her missing. They suspect that he is involved in her disappearance and end up questioning him over the nature of their relationship. When a patient with Asperger's syndrome cannot have a routine operation because the hospital does not have the necessary equipment, Lady Byrne (Jane Asher) feels appalled. She decides to take charge of her late husband's charity The Byrne Foundation and ensure that Holby City hospital benefits from the charity. With the charity having closer links to the hospital, and with Mark's help Lady Byrne appoints Daisha to be the ambassador of The Byrne Foundation.

Mark's relationship with clinical matron Judith Marchant (Shelagh McLeod) is ruined by is continued "fascination" with running Daisha's life. Daisha becomes interested in new F1 doctor Oliver Valentine (James Anderson), but Chrissie also develops a romantic interest in him. Mark becomes jealous of Daisha's attempts to flirt with Oliver. Daisha shows less interest in him than Chrissie, of whose attentiveness Anderson said, "I think any hot-blooded male would find that attractive". Oliver goes to ruin his chances with Daisha when he encouraged a patient to complain about her diagnosis – though Anderson noted, "he does apologise to Daisha, and sweetly gives her a cupcake". But Daisha makes it clear to Oliver that their chance of romance has passed. This left Chrissie free to pursue Oliver.

=== Departure ===
In 2010, it was announced that Grant had decided to leave Holby City to pursue an acting career in the United States. The actress had previously discussed her international career ambitions shortly after joining the show. Of her departure grant stated "it has been the most wonderful two years of my acting career. I'm grateful to the producers for throwing me into the deep end by giving me some of the toughest storylines to work on." A journalist from RTÉ.ie reported that Daisha would be shot in the build up to her exit storyline. They added the experience would prompt her to leave for The Philippines.

The scenes play out on-screen when Daisha joins Specialist registrar Joseph Byrne (Luke Roberts) on a night out. When they visit an Indian restaurant for a meal a gunman takes her hostage. The events of which were played out during an experimental style of story telling for the show. Two episodes ("The Butterfly Effect – Part 1" and "The Butterfly Effect – Part 2") were created to focus on the events telling the same story from different character's perspectives. Joseph risks his life to save Daisha from the crisis but in the commotion shots are fired. Daisha and Joseph make it out of the restaurant only for Daisha to realise she has been shot and falls unconscious. She is admitted to hospital and her colleagues think they will not be able to save her life. But Consultant Connie Beauchamp (Amanda Mealing) returns to the show and uses her skills to help Daisha survive. Producers made it clear to Grant that they were not killing her character off in the storyline so she could one day return to the show. Grant later told Riah Matthews from the Nottingham Post that it was "such a wonderful journey". She believed that Daisha's dramatic stories saw her "thrown in the deep end" when she took the role. Daisha leaves the show during the episode titled "Tipping Point", broadcast on 23 March 2010, after appearing in a total of 97 episodes.

== Reception ==
A writer from Worcester News said that Grant had become known to millions as Daisha. Daniel Kilkelly of Digital Spy stated "Daisha quickly became known for her straight-talking nature." A critic from the North Wales Daily Post chose Daisha being shot in the publications "Pick of the day" feature. Jane Simon (Daily Mirror) could not understand Daisha being oblivious to Mark's feelings. She quipped "how Daisha has so-far failed to spot any of the tell-tale symptoms that Mark is in love with her does makes you wonder about her suitability for nursing." Upon viewing Mark trying to prevent Daisha from discharging herself, Simon grew tired of Mark's meddling behaviour and assessed "although he’s probably right about that, he’s wrong about it being any of his business."

The critic was left unimpressed when Daisha tried to have an abortion with painkillers. She scathed "you have to remind yourself who the health professionals are at Holby and who are the patients." She later wrote that "everyone is bonding like mad" with Daisha's baby. Adding that even "anti freeze" Jac Naylor (Rosie Marcel) bonded with Joe more than Daisha who is just "wearing an expression of pure panic." Simon continued to be annoyed by her and later judged Daisha's obsession with nail varnish. She bemoaned "Daisha finally admits that she’s having trouble coping with a demanding, full-time job and a small baby. But not so much trouble, you’ll notice, that she doesn’t have time to make sure that she’s always got a perfect manicure." Mark Lawson from The Guardian branded Daisha and Mark a "troubled couple". Riah Matthews from the Nottingham Post said "during her time in Holby City, her character, Daisha, had an eventful time including giving birth in a lift and being taken hostage."
