= Linden Cullen =

Fictional character from Holby City

- Holby City character
- First appearance: "Stolen"; 15 January 2008
- Last appearance: "Misfit Love"; 12 October 2010
- Created by: Tony McHale
- Portrayed by: Duncan Pow

In-universe information
- Occupation: Head of AAU; Consultant general surgeon
- Spouse: Olivia Rose Cullen
- Children: Holly Cullen
- Religion: Catholic

Linden Cullen is a fictional character from the BBC medical drama Holby City, portrayed by actor Duncan Pow. He made his first appearance in the series ten episode "Stolen", broadcast on 15 January 2008. The character was the head of Holby City Hospital's surgical admissions ward. He was killed off at the end of the twelfth series on 12 October 2010.

== Creation ==
It was first announced on 6 November 2007 that actor Duncan Pow had been cast in the role of Linden, when series producer Diana Kyle described the new character as "dishy...good-looking and sexy". In the context of the show, Linden was introduced as the new head of the hospital's Acute Assessment Unit, a position which had been filled on a temporary basis by Lola Griffin (Sharon D. Clarke) since the departure of the department's former head, consultant Abra Durant (Adrian Edmondson), at the end of the show's ninth series.

Interviewed a year after his casting was announced, Pow commented on his time on Holby City so far: "I don't think I've ever enjoyed a job as much. It is a pleasure to get up every morning and spend my days working at Holby. From the producers, writers and production staff through to the crew and the cast, everyone is lovely to work with and the atmosphere is always positive and good fun. What more could I wish for? I'm getting paid to do something I love [...] Linden is a very complex character to play and getting your teeth into him has been a dream, any actor would relish the opportunity, I just feel lucky and privileged that it was me that was given the chance".

== Development ==
Pow explained of his character: "Linden has demons and I really enjoy examining where his pain derives from and how it manifests itself in his day to day life. I guess for Linden he is living a life that he hasn't chosen for himself, he has great faith in God and when Olivia died I think that that was when he chose the path he walks every day. I think if I had lived Linden's life I would have renounced God, not been able to accept what had happened. It would have driven me mad or to drink probably. But Linden made his choice then, to keep his Faith, to put his Faith in God and to try and spend his life doing good in the knowledge that God has a purpose for him. I think we have all experienced loss at some point in our lives and how we cope with that loss, defines us. Exploring that in Linden has been emotional but gratifying". Asked to describe the similarities and differences between his own personality and Linden's, Pow replied: "I work incredibly hard at my job, as does Linden. He punishes himself for mistakes, as do I. I guess in many ways we share the same work ethos and the same guilt complex. The similarities end there though."

Pow has commented that his favourite scenes as Linden are those revolving around Olivia and Holly. Asked whether he felt Linden could ever fall in love again, Pow commented: "I think Linden has the potential, very much, to love again. I think Linden was a wonderful husband and father. I'm sure that Olivia, Linden and Holly laughed together all the time. I think that their life was one of love, joy and family. I think that is why it is so hard for him to carry what he has lost every single day. I think there are things with Holly he needs to resolve before he can move on from Olivia. But I think he has feelings for someone that have awoken something inside him and I think that what happens in the future with Linden, and in his love life, will show the viewers more facets of his personality, but I also think it will show you that Linden deserves to fall in love again. There is a good human being with a big heart wasting away on his own. I think he could make someone's life really special and I hope that one day he gets the chance to."

In January 2010, Pow told the producers that he wanted to leave the show and they opted to kill Linden off. Pow commented, "I've never been killed before, so it's exciting!". Producer Myar Craig-Brown stated the team wanted "a climatic end" to series twelve, so Linden was killed during the last episode. Craig-Brown said it was a sad decision to end a character's life. Linden's exit storyline saw him intervene when violent drug addict Monty Richards (Nick Fearn) attacked Linden's former lover Faye Morton (Patsy Kensit). As Linden helped Faye, Monty struck him on the head with a vodka bottle. Pow told Katy Moon of Inside Soap, "The scriptwriters basically said, 'He lived his life by the bottle, so let's kill him off using one.' These guys are very good at what they do, and you take what you get and make it as real as possible. So it's the end for Linden, I'm afraid." Pow admitted that he would not miss playing Linden, as he struggled to shake him off when he went home. He branded the character "a miserable sod" and added that he was looking forward to not having him in his head any more.

== Storylines ==
Linden's arrival at Holby City Hospital in episode "Stolen" surprises staff with the announcement that the Acute Assessment Unit is to be transformed into a surgical admissions ward. Staff nurse Donna Jackson quickly develops a crush on him, but a brief lunch date in episode "Final Cut" proves them to be incompatible. Linden quickly develops a reputation as a maverick, irritating both Lola Griffin and Mark Williams by performing surgical procedures in the treatment bay, which is not yet ready for use as a theatre. Maddy Young is intrigued by Linden's refusal to treat one specific patient, believing his reticence to stem from his Catholic faith and his assumption the patient has just undergone an abortion, when in fact she has miscarried. When the patient later dies, Linden is forced to admit to Maddy that his actions towards her were driven by her strong resemblance to his deceased wife, Olivia.

In episode "New Lands, New Beginnings", Linden travels to Cape Town, South Africa, with Registrar Joseph Byrne, to track down missing Ward Sister Faye Morton. Linden develops feelings for Faye, and admits in confessional to feeling he has betrayed Olivia. He reveals that Olivia was killed in a car crash, for which he blames himself, and that his daughter Holly reminds him of Olivia to the extent that he cannot bear to see her, so is being raised by Olivia's parents instead of him.

Episode "Only Believe" sees Linden suspended after the death of a patient on his operating table. It is several weeks before he is cleared of negligence, with Maddy illegally obtaining samples from the deceased patient for testing in order to prove his innocence. In the interim, Linden becomes deeply involved with a pair of Korean asylum seekers, the Tans, one of whom is pregnant with conjoined twins. As the couple are Christian, he feels compelled by his faith to help them, and becomes embroiled in their plight to the extent that he is not allowed to assist in the twins' eventual separation operation because of his over-involvement. He aids hospital Chief Executive Officer Jayne Grayson in defending the procedure to the national press, helping to secure funding for the operation from the British government, and is relieved when the procedure proves successful and both twins survive. Linden later saves the life of Jayne's son Christian, successfully reviving him when the boy is retrieved from a river, having been submerged for over six hours. As a result, he proposes a trial of the flash cooling technique he utilized to the hospital board, but is disappointed when they refuse to fast-track the trial through the testing stages.

Linden confesses his love for Faye shortly after she marries Joseph. They kiss, but Faye immediately regrets it and tells Linden she is committed to Joseph. Faye's son Archie later dies, and Linden supports her through her bereavement. In late 2009, Holly arrives at the hospital having run away from her grandparents. She moves in with Linden, but their relationship remains strained until Holly is hit by a car and Linden saves her life, using the same procedure he attempted unsuccessfully on Olivia. When Faye and Joseph separate, she and Linden begin a relationship. Faye discovers that she is pregnant with Joseph's baby, but Linden promises to support her and they become briefly engaged. Linden's Christian principles are tested when Faye cites their infidelity as the reason for her impending divorce. He becomes concerned that Faye may be a pathological liar, and terminates their engagement. Faye is later attacked by a heroin-addicted patient. Linden attempts to defend her, but is hit in the head with a glass bottle and dies.

== Reception ==
In 2009, Linden was voted Holby City fans' "Favourite Newcomer of Series 10", receiving 58.5% of the vote. Pow commented on his character's popularity and award win: "I try not to think too much about Linden and how he is viewed by fans. I think it's great that you guys voted Linden as Best Newcomer and that he has been well received but I guess the fact he has a fan base is down to Tony McHale, Diana Kyle and the writing team coming up with such an interesting character and Tony, Diana, Liz Stoll and Julia Crampsie for giving me the opportunity to play him". Discussing the feedback he receives from viewers about Linden, Pow explained that people "like his honesty and dedication to others", commenting that: "he's quite selfless, I guess, and that is an incredibly endearing quality".

In September 2008, the Daily Mirror's Jane Simon wrote critically of the character, stating: "Holby has developed an unpleasant rash of annoyingly wet and whispering male docs. Elliot, Linden, Joseph - you daren't let any of them out in the rain in case they dissolve." The two-part episode which saw the climax of Linden's involvement with the Tans and their conjoined twins proved popular with critics, and was selected as a televisual "Pick of the Day" by the Western Mail, the Daily Record, the Huddersfield Daily Examiner, the Sunday Mercury, the Daily Mirror, the Birmingham Mail, and the Liverpool Echo.
