= Sam Strachan =

Fictional character in Holby City

- Holby City character
- Tom Chambers as Sam Strachan in 2006
- First appearance: "Mother Love"; 3 January 2006 (Holby City) "Hearts and Flowers"; 13 February 2016 (Casualty)
- Last appearance: "Maria's Christmas Carol"; 23 December 2008 (Holby City) "Somewhere Between Silences - Part Two"; 22 July 2017 (Casualty)
- Created by: Richard Stokes
- Portrayed by: Tom Chambers

In-universe information
- Occupation: Speciality doctor, emergency medicine/cardiothoracic surgery (prev. specialist registrar, medical director, consultant cardiothoracic surgeon)
- Family: Audrey Strachan (mother)
- Significant others: Connie Beauchamp; Chrissie Williams; Maddy Young; Faye Morton; Zoe Foxe; Maria Kendall; Emma Dufresne
- Children: Kieron Patel; Grace Beauchamp

Samuel Noel "Sam" Strachan is a fictional character in the BBC medical drama Holby City, portrayed by actor Tom Chambers. The character first appeared on-screen on 3 January 2006, in episode "Mother Love" - series 8, episode 12 of the programme. Chambers was cast in the role after sending a video of himself performing a Fred Astaire dance routine to over 800 television producers, and piquing the interest of BBC Casting Director Julie Harkin. Although he originally auditioned for only a minor role in the show, he was later asked back to audition for the newly created role of major character Sam Strachan.

Sam's initial function in the show was that of hospital Lothario – romancing and fathering a child with his boss, Connie Beauchamp (Amanda Mealing), as well as engaging in relationships with Ward Sisters Chrissie Williams (Tina Hobley) and Faye Morton (Patsy Kensit), SHO Maddy Young (Nadine Lewington), and Staff Nurse Zoe Foxe (Alicia Davies). However, he was taken on a redemptive path and was seen to change his philandering ways after being diagnosed with Non-Hodgkin lymphoma stage three, with just a 40% survival rate.

Chambers left his role in 2008. The character's son, Kieron Patel, was introduced to facilitate his departure storyline and Chambers made his final appearance in Holby City on 23 December 2008, in episode "Maria's Christmas Carol" - series 11, episode 11 of the programme.

The character was reintroduced in 2016, appearing in Holby City's sister show, Casualty. Chambers reprised his role for two episodes in February and one episode in September. Producer Erika Hossington announced that Sam would be reintroduced for a longer stint in February 2017 as Sam receives a job at the hospital.

The character has proven highly popular with fans of the show, being voted in 2006 'Favourite Newcomer' of the series, and in 2007 'Favourite All-Time Male' within the show. However, in October 2007, the character also came under heavy criticism by drinks industry body the Portman Group, resulting from an incident of on-screen binge drinking, broadcast without showing any negative effects, which the group lambasted as "highly irresponsible."

== Creation ==
Sam Strachan was one of eight new characters to join Holby City's cast in its eighth series. In the context of the show, the character's arrival coincided with the on-screen expansion of Darwin, the Cardiothoracic surgical ward. Over the course of series 7 and 8, medical staff on this ward had been reduced solely to nurses, and Consultant Connie Beauchamp. However, the series 8 plot strand which saw Connie strive to turn Holby City Hospital into a Cardiothoracic Centre of Excellence required a similar expansion of ward staff, and so three new Cardiothoracic surgical characters were created — Consultant Elliot Hope (Paul Bradley), and Registrars Sam Strachan and Joseph Byrne (Luke Roberts).

Tom Chambers was approached about assuming the role of Sam by BBC casting director Julie Harkin, who was also responsible for casting fellow Holby City newcomers Rakie Ayola as Kyla Tyson and Luke Roberts as Joseph Byrne. Chambers has revealed that he sent a video of himself performing a Fred Astaire tap dance routine to over 800 stage and television directors and producers in the UK, explaining: "Julie Harkin in casting at Holby saw it and gave me a call because they thought it was unusual. Originally I went up for a small role as an American doctor, but after the audition they said come back next week to audition for a bigger part and that was it!" Upon assuming the role of Sam, Chambers revealed that he had once been an avid viewer of Holby City's sister show, Casualty, recalling watching it as far back as 1991.

Prior to beginning work on the show, Chambers underwent observational training at the NHS Heart Hospital in London, watching three open-heart operations. He has described it as "the most amazing experience I've ever witnessed." Speaking of his nerves on his first day on set, Chambers has commented that the experience was made worse by the fact it was also new co-star Luke Roberts' first day, and: "we had rehearsals and all the top producers, executive producers and everyone from the script writers to the floor runners came on set and watched us. That's normal but I wasn't expecting such a big audience just for the rehearsals."

Chambers has spoken highly of his relationship with his co-stars, explaining that: "Luke and I joined at the same time so we've always had a kinship and on our dressing room corridor we have Patsy, Rosie, Phoebe, Rakie and Jaye so there's always some banter going on, it's like being back at school. I think we're lucky because the guests we have on the show often comment on what a good atmosphere Holby has. [...] Paul Bradley who plays Elliot is one of the funniest people to work with - when the cameras aren't rolling he's very good at turning difficult moments into humour when everyone's feeling the strain to finish the day."

== Development ==
=== Personality ===
The BBC have described Sam as a compassionate, decisive adrenaline junkie. A hugely volatile person, his emotions can land him in hot water". Chambers has added to this, assessing of his character: "In brief I'd say he loves his job and loves a challenge, is laid back but a bit of a rule-bender and slightly mischievous when it comes to trying to help the patients against hospital policy and hierarchy. He loves women but can't let himself get too wrapped up in them because work comes first... at the moment."

Sam's personality was further developed in an episode which saw the character discover one of his patients to be a male escort. Although he was aware that the woman accompanying his patient was a client rather than a relative, he persuaded her to sign consent forms on the patient's behalf. Chambers has described this plot strand as portraying Sam "(bending) the rules to make something happen [...] It's yet another example of Sam not thinking about the repercussions of his actions."

The character went on to form a close bond with 14-year-old child prostitute, patient Jade MacGuire (Ophelia Lovibond). Despite his colleagues' malicious gossip about the potentially inappropriate nature of their relationship, he repeatedly pushed the boundaries of their doctor/patient relationship in an attempt to take care of her, going as far as to shelter her in his own home after discovering her to be pregnant. Chambers has commented: "The storyline with the homeless prostitute was a challenge. Sam, trying to help but making stupid mistakes and having to suffer the consequences - it could have easily been seen as sleaze if you didn't get the balance right."

=== Relationships ===
During his time at Holby City hospital, Sam has romanced Connie Beauchamp, Chrissie Williams, Faye Morton, Maddy Young and Zoe Foxe. His brief relationship with Connie resulted in the birth of their daughter Grace. Sam has one other child - a son he fathered in his teenage years who was subsequently adopted and who he has only seen once, shortly after his birth.

Sam's love triangle

Interviewed in January 2006, Chambers foreshadowed major developments for his character when he stated: "I think Sam's ideal woman might be Connie because she's feisty, doesn't beat around the bush and is very talented, which is always sexy. However I reckon they clash quite a lot because she manipulates with her power play and won't drop the act so it would be very much on a love hate basis." The two characters went on to have a brief sexual relationship, resulting in Connie becoming pregnant with Sam's child. Once the revelation of Connie's pregnancy had been made, Chambers asserted of the tension between the separated couple: "Some of the scenes with Connie work amazingly well because we do genuinely get worked up and we like to keep it that way until filming is finished. It's a useful tip to let the frustrations come through in your work - it makes good viewing."

From his relationship with Connie, Sam moved on to a love triangle storyline with Ward Sisters Faye Morton and Chrissie Williams. Kensit said of the relationship in August 2007, as the storyline was ongoing: "For Faye, Sam is not Mr Right, simply Mr Right Now. But Faye is not as sweet as she looks - there's a streak of toughness there... It's all going to get very messy!" Once his deception was uncovered, Sam attempted to salvage his romantic relationship with Chrissie, but was unsuccessful. For some weeks thereafter, Sam engaged in casual sexual relationships with Senior house officer Maddy Young and Staff Nurse Zoe Foxe. These were, however, stymied by the discovery he had cancer.

=== Non-Hodgkin lymphoma ===
In November 2007, the character was diagnosed with Non-Hodgkin lymphoma. Although he had been shown to be feeling sickly in the show for some time, he was wary of being tested. Even when forced into it by friend and colleague Maddy Young, he initially refused to so much as look at his results. Chambers explained: "It's serious, but Sam's playing it down. Of course he's scared but he deals with it by just wanting to laugh it off and make jokes about it". He speculated that the experience would force Sam to grow up and appreciate life more, as well as seriously consider the future of his daughter, Grace, and cease his philandering way with female staff. Chambers has also spoken extensively about the research he did before beginning the cancer storyline:

"When I was first told about the storyline, I felt honoured to be given such a big opportunity. But I was also aware that I had a huge responsibility to get it right and do justice to those suffering in real life. Because Sam has chemotherapy, I was asked if I'd be willing to shave off my hair, and I said, "Absolutely," which is why I'm bald. I've also done a lot of research, and try hard to separate my character from my life off-screen, but I feel guilty that at the end of each day I can walk away from the illness, when many aren't so fortunate."

Sam's illness was played out over the course of the show's tenth series, reaching its zenith when he developed sepsis and went into septic shock in episode "Long Dark Night" and put on Keller to work as a general surgical registrar to loosen the stress sometime later. He pulled through, however, and was eventually given the all-clear from cancer eight months after having been diagnosed, in episode "Only Believe".

=== Departure ===
A show insider revealed that "Tom’s departure will leave his fans in tears, but Holby bosses are keeping tight-lipped about whether or not Sam will be killed off." Chambers explained of his decision to leave: "I was worried about telling the bosses, but I wrote a long letter to the producers explaining my decision and they were incredibly nice about it. Sam Strachan has gone through so much in the past year with his cancer – it seemed like the perfect time to make the break." Several episodes before the character's departure, his estranged son Kieron played by Misha Crosby, was introduced to Holby City. Father and son both developed romantic feelings for nurse Maria Kendall, leading to Sam asking her to accompany them both to New York, where Kieron was a famous violinist. After being shown her future should she accept, Maria declined Sam's offer, and he and Keiron departed together.

=== Casualty introduction ===
Although the character had been mentioned on several occasions following the introduction of his daughter Grace Beauchamp (Emily Carey) and Audrey Strachan (Frances Tomelty), the character never made an appearance. However, on 17 December 2015, it was announced that Chambers had reprised his role and would appear in Casualty. Sam would return in a guest appearance when Grace is admitted into the hospital's emergency department. His return aided the storyline where Connie reconciles with Grace. The character returned for two episodes in the series 30 episodes, "Hearts and Flowers" and "Just Do It", broadcast on 13 and 20 February 2016. Chambers said the relationship between Sam and Connie is "really exciting to play because no one can get under her skin like he can." He added that Sam is able to "make [Connie] uncomfortable."

Chambers reprised the role again in the series 31 episode, "Strike Three", broadcast on 10 September 2016. In February 2017, series producer Erika Hossington revealed in an interview with Digital Spy that the character would be reintroduced "for a little while". She said, "Sam is going to get a job in the hospital and he will be pitted against the rest of the team". She added that Sam would be involved in Grace's recovery and Connie's relationship with Jacob Masters (Charles Venn).

In an interview with Sarah Ellis of Inside Soap, Chambers revealed he would depart the serial at the conclusion of his contract in late 2017 due to a prior commitment. He explained that he would be touring with a musical, which disappointed show bosses, but would return to the show at the conclusion of the tour.

== Reception ==
In 2006, Tom Chambers was named tenth 'Best Actor' in the BBC Drama awards for his portrayal of the character. He has proven popular with fans of the show, performing well in the annual official fan awards. In 2006 he was named 'Favourite Male' and second 'Favourite Newcomer of Series 8', with the Connie/Sam/Chrissie storyline voted second' Favourite Storyline of Series 8', and his pairing with Connie 'Best Couple of Series 8'. In 2007 he ranked second 'Favourite Male of Series 9', and also 'Favourite All-Time Male'. Connie and Sam were again voted 'Best Couple of Series 9', with Tom Chambers' portrayal of Sam during the birth of their daughter voted fifth 'Best Acting Performance' of the series. Asked to comment on why he thought Sam had proven so popular with viewers, Chambers responded: "No idea! I just try to turn up on time and learn my lines. I love playing Sam and finding different ways of doing things. It's a roller-coaster of emotions and storylines - some are not as easy to manage as others and it's always a challenge to find the most natural and interesting way to deliver."

Controversy arose in September 2006, when a set of publicity shots were released to weekly TV magazines showing Sam and Connie engaging in a raunchy kiss in Connie's office, but the scene failed to ever materialise on screen. Series producer Diana Kyle addressed complaints from fans with the statement:

"To those people who complained that a photograph appeared in the press showing Connie and Sam kissing when they did not actually kiss in the transmitted episode, I am afraid I must say a genuine mistake occurred for which I apologise. The only script that ever featured Connie and Sam actually kissing was in the final scene of Episode 44 (transmitted on 29 August). This was edited together as scripted and shot. Nothing was cut [...] I am sorry if some members of our audience felt cheated. A photographer attended the shoot for Episode 46 and took a selection of shots of Sam and Connie. A photograph from this shoot was mistakenly released and marked as being from Episode 45 as Connie was wearing the same outfit in both episodes. I can only apologise for this mistake. [...] I am sorry a few people had concerns over these episodes."

Chambers has contradicted this statement, asserting that a cut scene did in fact exist, but that he is not aware of the reason it was omitted from the relevant episode. He stated: "It may have given off the wrong idea, it may have been too risky. The producers work very hard to get the right image at the right time and it may have just looked out of place. It's still a mystery to this day..."

In October 2007, drinks' industry body the Portman Group made an official complaint to communications regulator Ofcom about a scene in Holby City episode "Trial and Retribution", which depicted characters Sam and Maddy Young each taking five shots of tequila following a stressful day at work. The body's chief executive David Poley claimed that in failing to show the negative consequences of this action, the series was presenting a "highly irresponsible portrayal of excessive and rapid drinking". In response to the groups' accusation that "We would expect the BBC to take greater care with the portrayal of alcohol in programmes", the BBC released a statement explaining that: "Holby City takes the issue of the negative effects of alcohol abuse very seriously. On occasions when our continuing drama series deal with alcohol within a storyline we always seek to handle the issue sensitivity.

Medical journal The Lancet featured an article in May 2008 entitled 'Cancer in Medical Dramas', which examined the character's Non-Hodgkin lymphoma storyline. Talha Burki, author of the article, quoted Martin Ledwick, Cancer Research UK's head of patient information, as approving of the plot, stating: "There is a value in dramas, they can make cancer more normal, less frightening. [...] If people see a character they like get cancer, and that character fights the illness, then that's a good message to take home".
