= Maddy Young =

Fictional character from Holby City

- Holby City character
- Nadine Lewington as Maddy Young in 2007
- First appearance: 9x15, "Face Value", 16 January 2007
- Last appearance: 11x32, "Just a Perfect Day," 26 May 2009
- Created by: Tony McHale
- Portrayed by: Nadine Lewington

In-universe information
- Occupation: Senior House Officer, General Surgery, AAU
- Family: Simon Young (father); Hannah Mason (sister); Sunny Mason (niece)
- Significant others: Dan Clifford; Sam Strachan

Madeleine "Maddy" Young is a fictional character in the BBC medical drama Holby City, portrayed by actress Nadine Lewington. The character first appeared on-screen on 16 January 2007 in episode "Face Value" - series 9, episode 15 of the programme. Her final appearance in the show was in the Series 11 episode "Just A Perfect Day" when her character was fatally stabbed. Her role in the show was that of a Senior House Officer undergoing her general surgical rotation in Holby's acute admissions unit. Described by the BBC as "enthusiastic [...] fun" and "dedicated to her job", Maddy was created alongside fellow new character General Surgical Consultant Dan Clifford. Her major storylines have centred on their friendship and relationship as well as her troubled family background and her continual rule breaking.

The character has proven popular with viewers, seeing Lewington long-listed for the 'Most Popular Newcomer' award at the 2007 National Television Awards for her portrayal of the character, and Maddy voted by Holby City fans 'Favourite Newcomer' of Series 9. However, in October 2007, the character also came under heavy criticism from drinks industry body the Portman Group, resulting from an incident of on-screen binge drinking broadcast without showing any negative effects, which the group lambasted as "highly irresponsible."

In May 2009, Maddy died after being stabbed by disturbed patient Chantelle Tanner. After the attack, a full episode misled viewers by showing what would have happened if Maddy had been saved, before revealing at the end that Maddy had actually died.

== Creation ==
Maddy was created by Holby City's executive producer Tony McHale as an SHO level doctor who would work on the hospital's Acute Assessment Unit. The character was conceived alongside fellow series 9 newcomer Dan Clifford (Peter Wingfield), who arrived as the new General Surgical Consultant of the hospital's Keller Ward, in episode "It's Been a Long Day" - eight weeks before the introduction of Maddy. BBC Publicity explained at the time: "Maddy is good friends with Clifford (Peter Wingfield) and has saved him from trouble on a few occasions". In the closing credits of the character's first two appearances - episodes "Face Value" and "Feast or Famine" - her name was given as "Maddie Young". In every subsequent episode, the character has been credited by the altered spelling of "Maddy Young".

Lewington's Casualty appearance

On 4 October 2006, it was announced that actress Nadine Lewington had been cast in the role of Maddy. Lewington had made a previous appearance in series 20, episode 22 of Holby City's sister show Casualty. Lewington recalls of her role: "I was a young married mum of one with another on the way. I loved my little bump. My reckless hubbie had had a motorbike accident, in which a baby was injured, after promising to give the bikes up. I threatened to leave him, Charlie Fairhead gave him what for and told him how lucky he was to have me and he promised to be model father after all. Happily ever after. It was a really sweet little story actually. Very touching".

On joining the cast of Holby City, Lewington commented: "I've been on cloud nine since receiving that all-important phone call. My parents are surprised to suddenly have a doctor in the family but are thrilled nonetheless! I'm just really looking forward to being part of an incredible cast in such a successful show – I can't wait!" A spokesperson for BBC Publicity added: "We are delighted to have Nadine on board to play the part of Maddy, she's a great addition to the show and her character will be involved in some dramatic storylines." Discussing her casting a year into her time on the show, Lewington assessed: "I enjoy it more as I wade through the years. As with any ensemble work, the more time spent as a team, working together and discovering each others rhythms, dynamics and struggles, the better. And because of that, more fun. I certainly feel more settled and confident. Part of something. It was all a bit daunting for a while."

== Development ==
Upon announcing the character's creation, BBC Publicity initially stated of her personality: "Maddy's enthusiasm and ability speaks for itself. She's a young SHO who loves her job and is fun to be around." Expanding, it was added that: "Maddy's young, fun and up for a laugh while, at the same time, dedicated to her job. She's definitely not going to be single for very long, but there's a family secret she's harbouring which could just get in the way..." The BBC Holby City homepage describes Maddy as: "enthusiastic and eager to learn. Being with her is fun. She doesn't moan, she loves her job and gets on with it. She just wants to be happy". Comparing the character's personality to her own, Lewington commented: "My good pal, Sir Robert Powell (Mark Williams) has said that a character is often only yourself turned 3 degrees. I think this to be true of Maddy and I. There are similarities. Although she's smarter than me, she does the daftest things! She's says things I wouldn't. But when she cries, I cry and when she smiles, I smile".

Throughout the show's ninth series, Maddy maintained a close relationship with General Surgical Consultant Dan Clifford. It was revealed in her first episode that she had previously worked alongside him in Middlesex. It later came to light that she once covered for him when he attempted an operation drunk - going so far as to date the lesbian anesthetist present during the surgery in order to buy her silence. Shortly before his departure from Holby City, Dan and Maddy briefly became romantically involved. However, Dan was also in love with his sister-in-law Louise and ultimately departed for a new job in France, leaving Maddy behind. Peter Wingfield (Dan) has said of the relationship:

"There was a line in one of the last episodes, "one of them seems perfect for you" and I always thought that summed it up. Dan and Maddy have always been incredibly close without becoming lovers, but it is obvious that they are great together, so when it happens it is effortless and joyous and has wonderful potential. But Dan's private demons prevent it from being allowed to live and grow. I always thought it might be great for him, if only he could have let it be."

Lewington's own assessment of the relationship is that: "Maddy doesn't have anyone in her life that she can count on. Dan was her family and that's what hurt so bad. I guess to have Dan as a lover would mean that he would never go away. She wouldn't have to share him. Dan loved Maddy sincerely which is why he didn't want to risk hurting her anymore than he already had. He was too messed up to be good for anyone and he knew it."

The character also had a brief sexual relationship with hospital Lothario Sam Strachan. She and Sam had a one night stand in episode "The Borders of Sleep", and went on to become close friends, with Maddy assisting Sam in caring for a teenage prostitute he felt responsible for. She also supported him through his Non-Hodgkin lymphoma diagnosis, and enlisting his support in illegally proving a patient's death through negligence. In the show's tenth series, Maddy also formed a fast respect for the new head of the hospital's Acute Assessment Unit, Linden Cullen (Duncan Pow). Pow ruled out a romance between the two characters, however, stating: "They're protective of each other, but they're more like brother and sister than anything else. I don't think he's ready for the relationship merry-go-round at Holby just yet". He added that: "Any man would be a fool to turn down Maddy, but Linden wants his wife back". Similarly, Lewington has assessed that neither Sam nor Linden are Maddy's ideal man, and instead she is "waiting for a new hunk!"

== Storylines ==
Maddy arrives at Holby City Hospital in episode "Face Value". It is revealed that she has a history with General Surgical Consultant Dan Clifford, and that the pair are good friends. The pre-existing relationship between Maddy and Dan initially makes some staff wary of her, especially on the hospital's Acute Assessment Unit, where she is assigned. However, she quickly strikes up a friendship with PRHOs Matt Parker and Dean West, and Senior Staff Nurse Donna Jackson.

Maddy engages in a one-night stand with Cardiothoracic Surgical Registrar Sam Strachan in episode "The Borders of Sleep", and later bends the rules to help him take care of underage prostitute patient Jade MacGuire. In episode "What Lies Beneath", Maddy's father arrives in Holby having escaped from prison. She treats him for an injury he sustained prior to escaping, and, aided by Dan, helps him avoid the police when they arrive searching for him. Her father reveals to Dan that Maddy once stole pharmacy drugs and planted them on the abusive boyfriend of her twin sister, Hannah. She discusses her past with Dan, mentioning the fact she once covered for him when he operated drunk. Maddy gets into further trouble when she poses as Cardiothoracic Consultant Elliot Hope, attending a racial awareness course under the guise of "Ellie", only to be caught out by the hospital's Chief Executive Officer Jayne Grayson.

Maddy's sister Hannah arrives at Holby with an abscess in episode "Guilt by Association". Maddy convinces her to have an operation by illegally stopping her pain medication, in order to emphasize how badly she needs surgery. In the following episode, Hannah seeks out Maddy's help when she accidentally gives her daughter, Sunny, a methadone overdose. Although Maddy again breaks the rules and the law to help them, Sunny dies while being treated from an exacerbated pre-existing cardiac problem. The police are suspicious of Sunny's death, but Dan blackmails fellow Consultant Ric Griffin into covering up for Maddy. Dan and Maddy go on to share a short-lived romantic relationship before his departure in October 2007. She is hurt by Dan's love for his sister-in-law Louise, and left heartbroken when Dan departs Holby for a prestigious job in France. In episode "Love Will Tear Us Apart", Maddy makes an error in the middle of an operation after Dan calls her out of the blue to arrange a meeting. She is devastated when he later stands her up.

Following Dan's departure, Maddy goes on to support Sam through his battle with Non-Hodgkin lymphoma, and form a professional relationship with the new head of the AAU, Linden Cullen. When Linden is suspended following the death of a patient, Maddy breaks the law by stealing samples from the hospital's morgue to prove his innocence. She is severely reprimanded by Jayne Grayson, although Linden is eventually cleared. When Linden becomes involved with a case of conjoined twins, Maddy is temporarily placed in charge of the AAU in his absence.

Maddy had recently been transferred to Keller on surgical rotation. She continually tried to impress Ric. But Ric kept taking his frustrations out on her because she was friends with Tom O' Dowd. But Ric was impressed in the end and offered her a promotion and told she could be a great surgeon one day.

In "Mirror, Mirror" Maddy's sister Hannah, having been released from prison, arrives at Holby with her cellmate Chantelle, who has been stabbed, in her car. Because Chantelle refuses treatment in the hospital, believing they will send her back to jail for being in a fight, Maddy agrees to treat Chantelle in secret. Linden finds out and tries to help and they operate on her but Ric finds out and tells her to report it to the police. She refuses as doing so would cause Chantelle to run away, leaving her with a potentially fatal stab wound. As a consequence Ric withdraws her from the promotion interview.

In "Seeing Other People" Chantelle stabs Maddy in the back, whilst she was on her way to Ric Griffin to talk about the promotion.

In "Just a Perfect Day" Maria finds Maddy stabbed and bleeding out on the floor in the Keller ward toilets. She immediately starts trying to resuscitate her. Linden rushes in to help. Three weeks have passed since Maddy was stabbed. She is in Holby Care and we hear her thinking about a letter she has written to her sister Hannah. She seems to be fully recovered and is desperately trying to get back to work and be interviewed for the ST3 job. Ric held the interviews open until Maddy was well enough, and today she's going to make sure she gets the job. Maddy's going to show them that they can throw anything at her and she'll cope...even after being stabbed. Linden wants Maddy to be careful and take things easy, as she nearly died, but Maddy wants to get back to work.

Meanwhile, Maddy receives a visit from Dan Clifford, who she has not seen for over 18 months since he took his job abroad. After hearing about Maddy's attack he has arrived to see how she is doing and to offer her a research position with him at his new hospital. Maddy decides to try for the position at Holby before making any decisions.

Back on the ward, a father and his two daughters have been brought in, one with a stab wound and one badly burnt. The father only has minor injuries but the police seem to believe he had something to do with the incident. Maddy tries to find out what is happening from the father, who is not talking to the police. She seems to have some connection with him but can't seem to put her finger on what it is.

Ric is having second thoughts about allowing Maddy to be interviewed. He explains to Michael that he doesn't think that she is ready for the position. Maria overhears the pair's conversation and chips in saying that she feels that Maddy is perfect. Michael knows Maria is right but Ric thinks he might have made a mistake and he explains to Maddy that he is withdrawing her interview offer. Maddy is devastated.

Clifford comforts Maddy and explains that the board have now asked him to move back to Holby and there is a position waiting for him. After advice from Linden Maddy decides to stay at Holby. Her aim is to show Ric what she is capable of achieving. Determined to show Ric her skill she takes a leading role in the procedure on the stab victim. Ric is impressed but explains that he would like to see more before she gets an interview. Her plan has failed.

Maddy overhears Ric and Clifford talking about her. Clifford explains that Ric might be hit with a lawsuit if he denies Maddy an interview and suggests that he interviews her without giving her the job.

The stab victim dies and Maddy blames herself, even though there was nothing she could have done. But Ric tells Maddy he has reconsidered and she can have an interview. Although she's happy to have this opportunity she knows that Ric is only doing it to avoid a court case.

She heads into the interview, bold and honest about her work. She impresses the board and they give her the position. She can't believe it. She heads out to tell Dan Clifford the news, who then tells her that the board have offered that he can move his entire work to Holby and he tell her that the reason he wants to stay is that he loves her. Maddy is overjoyed and they kiss passionately against the bonnet of his car. She heads back to the ward to find the father of the stab victim missing. She finds him in the basement, confused and he speaks to Maddy as if she is his dead daughter. Maddy tries to help but he keeps referring to Maddy as his daughter. At the end of the episode, it is revealed that everything that happened since Maddy was stabbed was actually a dream and that Maddy actually died in Chantelle's attack. This whole episode was Maddy living out her perfect day in her head. On October 21, 2009, Chantelle was admitted to AAU, pregnant after her boyfriend kicked her in the stomach. Despite telling Maria she didn't kill Maddy, she actually confessed to the murder after Mark told her of the consequences about her lying about her boyfriend abusing her and killing Maddy.

== Reception ==
Within six months of arriving at Holby City, Lewington was long-listed for the 'Most Popular Newcomer' award at the 2007 National Television Awards, for her portrayal of the character. In the 2007 official fan awards, Maddy was voted fans' 'Favourite Newcomer of series 9', as well as third 'Favourite Female of series 9', fourth 'Favourite All-Time Female' and fifth 'Favourite series 9 Storyline', for the plot strand with her twin sister. Informed of Maddy's strong fan base, Lewington commented: "How lovely! I think it's because she's identifiable. People understand her motives and see that she has no hidden agenda. She's emotional but strong, cheeky but kind. I rather like her so I'm glad others do to!"

In October 2007, drinks' industry body the Portman Group made an official complaint to communications regulator Ofcom about a scene in Holby City episode "Trial and Retribution", which depicted the characters Maddy and Sam Strachan each taking five shots of tequila following a stressful day at work. The body's chief executive David Poley claimed that in failing to show the negative consequences of this action, the series was presenting a "highly irresponsible portrayal of excessive and rapid drinking". The Daily Telegraph noted that the complaint came shortly after Home Secretary Jacqui Smith expressed concern about televisual glorification of drunkenness, having told the Labour Party conference such a thing would be branded unacceptable as part of a "zero-tolerance" approach to anti-social behaviour. In response to the Portman Group's accusation that "We would expect the BBC to take greater care with the portrayal of alcohol in programmes", the BBC released a statement explaining that: "Holby City takes the issue of the negative effects of alcohol abuse very seriously. On occasions when our continuing drama series deal with alcohol within a storyline we always seek to handle the issue sensitively".

The series 10 episode "Love Will Tear Us Apart", which saw Maddy stood up by Dan on a return visit from France, was selected as a televisual pick of the day by The Guardian, the Daily Mirror, and the Birmingham Mail. The Guardian critic Gareth McLean was critical of the episode, writing: "Now here's an idea for another Holby spin-off - one set in the hospital's STD clinic. Of course, given the ceaseless intra-departmental shagging that goes on in that hospital, there might be too much crossover with existing shows, with not a look-in for characters who aren't actually on staff. Here, sexist surgeon Clifford returns to complicate Maddy's life, though since she's been sleeping with Sam, who's slept with Connie, Chrissie and Faye, she appears to need no help in that area.She's going to die." Daily Mirror critic Jim Shelley has discussed the outlandish nature of the character's storylines, dubbing the line "I don't know why people complain about the NHS" from a 2007 episode his 'Naive statement of the week', explaining: "Hmmmm let's see. Abra covering up that he was operating on his arms-dealer father. Maddy hiding the fact she killed her junkie sister's daughter. And secret cokehead Jesus Of Nazareth (Robert Powell) keeping quiet about counselling Elliot's son for heroin addiction. Oh yeah, and in Casualty, in Holby's A&E department, nurse Ruth Winters secretly fixed her dad's breathalyser test. Anyone detect a theme emerging?" Shelley has, however, also deemed Maddy to be one of Holby City's "few really good, realistic, characters".

== In popular culture ==
Lewington as Maddy on Children in Need

The 17 November 2006 Children in Need charity telethon included a segment featuring the Holby City cast performing a version of Hung Up by Madonna. Although the character had not yet made her on-screen debut in the programme, Lewington as Maddy appeared in the sketch - as did fellow newcomers Peter Wingfield (Dan Clifford) and Phoebe Thomas (Maria Kendall) who also had yet to arrive in the show itself. The 16 November 2007 Children in Need appeal again contained a musical performance from Holby City cast members. Lewington, alongside Rakie Ayola (Kyla Tyson) and Phoebe Thomas (Maria Kendall) provided backing vocals for Sharon D Clarke (Lola Griffin), who performed a soul version of Aretha Franklin's signature song, Respect. Lewington said of these appearances: "I had the time of my life...Woo hoo! Loved every second. Although I was a gibbering wreck before the live performance of 'Respect'. Sharon D Clarke was amazing, not a whisper of fear. I however was convinced that I was going to forget everything and stare blankly into the eyes of 14 million viewers or however many squillions there were watching. All went well though and I've got a little bit of history in my dvd collection ready for the grand kiddies!" Lewington has also appeared in a Holby City vs. Casualty special episode of BBC Two quiz show The Weakest Link, alongside co-stars Phoebe Thomas, Tom Chambers (Sam Strachan), Duncan Pow (Linden Cullen) and Robert Powell (Mark Williams).
