= New World Disorder (film) =

- Directed by: Richard Spence
- Written by: Jeffrey Smith; Ehren Kruger
- Produced by: Steve Beswick; Jon Kramer; Romain Schroeder; Silvio Muraglia; Tom Reeve
- Starring: Rutger Hauer; Andrew McCarthy; Tara Fitzgerald; Hari Dhillon
- Cinematography: Ivan Strasburg
- Edited by: Graham Walker
- Music by: Gast Waltzing
- Production company: Carousel Picture Company
- Distributed by: York Home Video US
- Release date: December 3, 1999
- Running time: 94 minutes
- Country: United States
- Language: English

New World Disorder is a 1999 American thriller/action film directed by Richard Spence. It features Rutger Hauer, Andrew McCarthy, Tara Fitzgerald, and Hari Dhillon. It was filmed in Luxembourg.

== Plot ==
Homicide detective David Marx (Rutger Hauer) teams up with computer expert Kris Paddock (Tara Fitzgerald) to track down a gang stealing computer chips from a list of factories.

== Cast ==
- Rutger Hauer as Detective David Marx
- Andrew McCarthy as Kurt Bishop
- Tara Fitzgerald as Kris Paddock
- Hari Dhillon as Mark Ohai
- Alun Ragland as Michael 'Fury' Dietrich
- Ian Butcher as Quark
- Brian Van Camp as Coltrane
- Anthony Warren as Nakamoto
- Martin McDougall as Sullivan
- Nicholas Pinnock as Weldon
- John Sharian as Rice
- Branwell Donaghey as Leo Galileo
- Lawrence Elman as Maximillian Biggs
- Michelle Gomez as Annika 'Amethyst' Rains
- Annaleisa M. Graham as Gloria 'Gigabite'
- Vincent Rappa as FBI Agent #1
- Radica Vujicin as Escort Girl (uncredited)
