= Mark Williams (Holby City) =

- Holby City character
- Robert Powell as Mark Williams
- First appearance: "Stick or Twist"; 15 February 2005
- Last appearance: "Don't Go Changing"; 25 January 2011
- Portrayed by: Robert Powell

In-universe information
- Occupation: Chief executive officer (prev. staff nurse, nursing consultant)
- Family: Frank Williams (father); Chrissie Williams (daughter); Daniel Williams (nephew)
- Spouse: Tricia Williams

Mark Williams is a fictional character from the BBC medical drama Holby City, portrayed by actor Robert Powell. The character first appeared in the series seven episode "Stick or Twist", broadcast on 15 February 2005. Mark was created as a new addition to the show's existing Williams family, entering as the ex-husband and father of established characters Tricia Williams (Sharon Maughan) and Chrissie Williams (Tina Hobley) respectively. Powell stated that he was looking forward to the opportunity to develop the character over a longer period of time than with the briefer acting roles he was more used to taking.

The character's major storylines have centered on his relationship with his family. He reunited with Tricia and discovered that she had been raped by his father, meaning Chrissie was actually his biological half-sister. Although the couple were able to put the past behind them and remarry, Tricia was killed in a road traffic accident in 2006. Mark struggled to cope in her absence, succumbing to a cocaine addiction in 2007. The character was later promoted to the hospital's chief executive officer. Powell left the serial in 2010 and Mark departed in the series thirteen episode "Don't Go Changing", broadcast on 25 February 2011. The character was well-received by the audience, although his cocaine storyline was criticised for its surrealism in the media.

== Creation ==
=== Background ===
The character of Mark was created as an addition to the existing Williams family on the show, composed of established characters Chrissie Williams (Tina Hobley), Mark's daughter, and Tricia Williams (Sharon Maughan), Mark's former wife. One series 7 plot strand saw Tricia diagnosed with breast cancer, and as Hobley explained: "Chrissie is extremely supportive and they start to become much closer." When Tricia was abandoned by her boyfriend, plastic surgeon character Carlos Fashola, Chrissie took it upon herself to seek out her father, hoping to reunite her family before it was too late. It was revealed that Mark and Tricia had met when they were both training to be nurses, but that Mark had walked out on the two of them when Chrissie was a child, and had parted on bad terms with Tricia.

=== Casting ===
It was first announced on 23 October 2004 that Robert Powell had been cast in the role of Mark. A Holby City spokesperson commented: "We are very excited about having Robert on board." Having signed a contract to appear in the show for at least a year, Robert Powell spoke of his introductory storyline with enthusiasm, stating that "With three Williamses on the ward, it'll be fireworks galore!" Tina Hobley agreed that his introductory storyline was "very good", adding "Robert Powell is a great actor and I am proud to be working with him."

Although he admitted to never having watched an episode of Holby City prior to his casting, Powell stated that he was attracted to the role because "I've never done a drama series of this kind before. It's great fun being allowed to develop a character over years rather than weeks." In preparation for assuming the role of Mark, he shadowed a nurse on a night shift at Charing Cross hospital, calling the experience "a revelation".

Powell's casting in the role marked the beginning of a trend remarked upon by TV critic Jim Shelley, who noted a tendency of Holby City producers toward hiring already well established actors, including comedian Adrian Edmondson and actress Patsy Kensit. When asked in November 2007 whether she actively sought out well-known-names to fill new roles in the show, series producer Diana Kyle responded: "It's lovely when we have a new member of the cast come in and bring an audience with them. But we want the best actors, and the star names we cast are always the best - which is why we go for them!"

== Development ==
=== Personality ===
The BBC describe Mark as "a carefree rogue, a wild child of the 60's. He's a rolling stone, always looking for an excuse to go on the run." Deemed by The Times to be "flaky, irresponsible, and untrustworthy", Powell has assessed of his character "he's the kind of man who is constantly in trouble. Mark's not malicious - he's worked as a nurse all his life - but he's certainly unreliable", imparting that he feels Mark as a phobia of authority. Although Powell stated in 2005 that Mark loved his wife and daughter dearly, he elaborated that: "He's a man to whom everything seems like a good idea at the time! Tends to avoid confrontation but this is probably because he is beset by women!" In 2008, a year after Tricia's death, the character referred to himself on-screen as "By day, fearless Consultant Nurse. By night, lonely old fart."

=== Relationship with Tricia ===
Mark first appeared in episode "Stick or Twist", when estranged daughter Chrissie Williams tracked him down in London - spurred on to find her father by her mother's recent breast cancer diagnosis. Asked by Chrissie to return with her to Holby in order to support her mother through her treatment, Mark initially refused, sending her away again. However, he later changed his mind and arrived at Holby City Hospital, taking a Staff Nurse job with the intention of getting to know his daughter. He found himself falling in love with Tricia again, and fought to win her affection from on-and-off boyfriend Carlos Fashola, eventually triumphing and reuniting with his former wife.

Their relationship was severely tested when Chrissie made contact with Mark's father, Frank Williams. Robert Powell explained: ""Chrissie finds Mark's father for him but he has not spoken to his father for some time since they had a major falling out. What she does not know is that the issues between Mark and his father are nothing compared to the issues between Mark's father and Tricia, his daughter-in-law." Indeed, Tricia was extremely pensive about the reunion, even more so when Frank was taken ill and admitted to the hospital. Sharon Maughan expanded on the storyline: "Tricia's horrified when Lisa tells her that Frank had a suspected stroke in the night and was rambling on about Chrissie being his daughter. At first, Tricia claims that Frank doesn't know what he is talking about because he is ill. But later, when Lisa finds her crying, she breaks down and reveals that Frank raped her when she was a teenager, during the time she was married to Mark." Tricia had Frank take a secret paternity test, confirming that he was indeed Chrissie's biological father. As his condition deteriorated, she lied, claiming that he had expressed an instruction that he did not wish to be resuscitated. Frank died, and Tricia hoped that Chrissie's true paternity could remain a secret.

=== Chrissie's paternity ===
However, as Powell explained, Tricia's secret did not stay hidden for long. "It's truly awful. It comes out because Mark is sorting out Frank's life insurance and the insurance company wants to see all of his medical notes. Tricia is nervous that Mark will find Frank had a paternity test, so she gets all his records and gives them to Mark in a sealed envelope. But Mark says he needs to add a cover letter and opens the envelope anyway. Of course he sees Frank took the test and demands to know what's going on. Mark's furious. Tricia runs away and Mark's left to deal with the hideous realisation that Chrissie's not his daughter and that his dad was a rapist. Then to make matters worse, he has to work with Chrissie, pretending everything's normal. I know that if I were in his shoes, I certainly wouldn't tell her. It doesn't take much imagination to realise how devastating that kind of news would be for Chrissie. Mark loves her and, at the end of the day, that's all that counts."

The pair separated, with Mark unable to deal with the revelation. Chrissie was informed that Mark was not her biological father, but the truth of her paternity was kept from her, resulting in a bitter fall out with her mother. It took many months for Mark and Tricia's relationship began to heal again, and even when they had managed to set the past behind them and move on, things did not run smoothly. Powell elaborated: "Mark and Tricia got back together. He was absolutely delighted. On top of that, he knew Tricia had asked for her breast reconstruction to be brought forward following a successful mastectomy." However, Mark then discovered that he had a mild form of anemia that could be hereditary, meaning Chrissie needed to be informed. Rather than revealing that Frank was her real father, Tricia suggested that she pretend to be the one with the condition. Powell continued: "'Chrissie's not stupid and is convinced Tricia's up to something. So, she decides to check her mum's file. Mark gets there first, but when he opens the file later he sees that Tricia has liver cancer and needs chemotherapy immediately - she'd found out recently." He stated: "The outlook is bleak and I've no idea how they'll manage to cope this time".

=== Remarriage; Tricia's death ===
Although Mark was desperate for Tricia to have chemotherapy, she proved reluctant, deciding that her previous cycles had been too grueling. Terrified that he might lose her, Mark proposed that they remarry. Initially, Tricia turned him down, with Sharon Maughan explaining: "She doesn't like the thought of saying 'til death do us part', knowing she's dying. Tricia's still in denial and doesn't want to admit she hasn't got long. She feels everything is accelerating out of her control." However, following an incident which saw the two characters taken hostage at work, Tricia rethought her decision. "It scares her and makes her realise that Mark's always been there for her; he offers a safe place away from the crazy world that's out there". The two remarried in the hospital peace garden in episode "Now or Never", with Chrissie and colleague Lola Griffin as witnesses. Tricia then underwent experimental surgery to excise her cancer, and she and Mark were delighted when it appeared to have been successful. They planned a second honeymoon in New York City, however, en route to the airport were involved in a road traffic accident. Tricia suffered serious injuries, and although she was stabilized in theatre by Diane Lloyd, her condition soon thereafter worsened, leaving Mark and Chrissie conflicted over how to continue with her treatment. Maughan explained: "Mark and Chrissie have completely opposing views. He's desperate to do anything he can and wants to put Tricia on a life support machine, but Chrissie is saying 'Stop, she's never going to be the same'." Ultimately, the two agreed to let Tricia pass away in peace.

=== Life after Tricia ===
Mark struggled to cope following Tricia's death, and despite being promoted to the position of Nursing Consultant, went on to develop a cocaine addiction in 2007. Initially he refused to recognise that he had a problem, but when Chrissie was threatened by his drug dealer, he accepted that he needed help. Friend and colleague Elliot Hope provided support, while Chrissie's boyfriend, Stuart McElroy, had Mark checked into rehab under the guise of attending a resuscitation refresher course. With their support, Mark was able to break his dependency, although he again became disillusioned when it transpired that Stuart was an alcoholic. In a drunken rage, he attacked Chrissie, slashing her face open with a scalpel. Chrissie decided to depart from Holby in order to recover, leaving Mark alone, but later returned. Mark later became involved in a relationship with Judith Marchant. Following the departure of CEO Vanessa Lytton, Mark was approached by Holby's chairman who asked him to apply for the position. Although initially unsure of his ability to do the job, Mark successfully applied.

=== In popular culture ===
The 17 November 2006 Children in Need charity telethon included a segment featuring the Holby City cast performing a version of Hung Up by Madonna. Powell as Mark featured prominently in this sketch, singing and dancing alongside many of his Holby City co-stars.

== Reception ==
The storyline which saw Mark become addicted to cocaine was criticised for its lack of realism by Daily Mirror writer Jim Shelley. He stated that although Mark had previously been one of the more normal characters in the show, there was no obvious reason behind his descent into cocaine addiction, deeming the storyline: "TV crack - instant, mind-altering, utterly addictive." The Stage writer Mark Wright examined the cocaine addiction storyline in contrast to complaints from drinks industry body the Portman Group that a scene featuring characters Maddy Young and Sam Strachan downing tequila shots was "highly irresponsible", writing: "To put this storm in a shot glass into perspective, the offending scene took place in the same episode that Mark Williams was in the gents chopping out a line of cocaine. Yes, Mark Williams played by Robert Powell. He was Jesus, you know! Now who’s talking social responsibility?"

The character has been generally well received by fans of the show. In the 2006 official fan awards, the storyline surrounding daughter Chrissie's true paternity was awarded 4th best of series 8, and Mark and Tricia were voted the series 5th Best Couple. In 2007, episode "One For My Baby" in which Mark's wife Tricia died, was voted best episode of series 9, which Mark and Tricia this time voted the series 3rd Best Couple.
