= Michael Spence (Holby City) =

- Holby City character
- Hari Dhillon as Michael Spence in 2008
- First appearance: "Unfinished Symphony"; 20 November 2007
- Last appearance: "Episode 46"; 28 February 2022
- Created by: Tony McHale
- Portrayed by: Hari Dhillon
- Spinoff(s): Casualty (2014)

In-universe information
- Occupation: Consultant general surgeon; (prev. Clinical lead, AAU; Director of Surgery; Consultant plastic surgeon
- Spouse: Annalese Carson
- Children: Meena Spence; Jasmine Spence; Milly Spence; Charlie Spence

Michael Spence is a fictional character from the BBC medical drama Holby City, portrayed by actor Hari Dhillon. The character first appeared on 20 November 2007, in the episode "Unfinished Symphony" - episode six of the show's tenth series. Dhillon had previously appeared in the show on a recurring basis in a more minor role, as Dr. Sunil Gupta, between 2001 and 2003. Dhillon took an extended break from the series in 2013 and Michael departs in the episode first broadcast on 17 December 2013. He returned for a month-long stint in 2014 and also appeared in an episode of sister show Casualty. In 2022, Dhillon returned for an episode as part of the show's final series.

== Development ==
=== Casting ===
The character was initially constructed as a public schoolboy, with less of a "bad boy" persona than he would ultimately exhibit on screen. Actor Hari Dhillon had a chance encounter with a Holby City casting director whilst in London, who suggested to him that he might be right for a part in the show. Dhillon was living in America, but as the 2007–2008 Writers Guild of America strike was ongoing at the time, his then partner Lara had suggested that he move back to London before the impending birth of their child. Dhillon submitted a tape, and the next day was asked if he was interested in the role. Given the circumstances, he has described his casting as a "beautiful stroke of luck". Dhillon had previously appeared in the show as minor character Sunil Gupta for six episodes after leaving drama school. He does not believe that this role contributed to his casting as Michael, but instead worried that it would work against him. In auditioning for Michael, Dhillon used his own accent, rather than the RP accent originally envisioned for the character. He explained that he "put [his] own twist on what [he] thought Michael Spence should be like." Executive producer Tony McHale and series producer Diana Kyle accepted his take on the character, and tailored the role towards his accent. Michael became an Asian character with an Indian/Christian background and the ability to speak Punjabi. Dhillon has stated: "Most producers would have just thrown my tape in the trash, considering that I wasn't able to give them their original vision of the character, but I really admire the way they were willing to build on what I was able to bring to Michael."

=== Characterisation ===
Describing Michael's personality, the official Holby City website states: "Being a doctor defines Michael. Surgery is his first love, it's the only time he feels true emotion." Dhillon believes that Michael is "a very idiosyncratic character" and "not overly sincere in that 'I'm just trying to save a life' way." He described: "He's very objective about himself - as though he is slightly outside of himself in situations - a slight ironic disposition. Half the time I think he says things just to watch the reaction. He's direct, honest, morally ambiguous, unapologetic. He certainly thinks and behaves outside the normal parameters of behaviour, which is challenging to many characters." Dhillon and Michael share a similar background. Michael grew up in India, moved to America, and now lives in the United Kingdom, while Dhillon grew up in San Francisco, spent nine months in India aged six, and also now lives in the United Kingdom. Explaining the impact of this on Michael's characterisation, Dhillon stated: "I think that type of background has a certain effect on people - I think we both share a slight ironic detachment from the world we are in. Sometimes it feels like you are an objective observer in your own life, like you are on the outside looking in. I don't feel overly identified with a particular country, I feel pretty comfortable in a number of different environments, and I think he does as well." Dhillon feels that Michael has a "self-destructive perverse streak", and believes that his world is limited to his work and family. He commented: "if you took one of those things away, you would cut out half of his personality. There's not much outside of that. He’s very muscular in his medical intellect but his emotional depth, or range, has almost withered. He's learning life's lessons late and in a hard way."

=== Relationships ===
Michael is introduced as being married with three daughters, however immediately upon arriving at Holby City Hospital, he becomes embroiled in potential relationships with both staff nurse Donna Jackson (Jaye Jacobs) and surgical registrar Jac Naylor (Rosie Marcel). He had an affair at his previous hospital, and left as he wanted a "clean slate". Dhillon believes that flirting with other women is in Michael's nature, but that he arrives in Holby seeking a fresh start, so initially turns down Donna's advances. When questioned on whether the spark between Michael and Jac would lead to anything more, Dhillon conceded: "Probably. This is Holby City, after all! And Michael's an old dog, so to speak."

In 2008, Michael became involved in a love triangle storyline with Donna and consultant cardiothoracic surgeon Connie Beauchamp (Amanda Mealing). He flirted with Connie, and had sex with Donna in a toilet stall to which Jaye Jacobs says she was hoping Donna would get somewhere a bit more glamorous Jacobs explained of Donna's affair with Michael: "Donna knows he's married deep down, although he hasn't actually told her, but unfortunately that doesn't stop her. It carries on for a while and Donna thinks he's the one, she is in love with him and he's different from all the others - she's deluded." She opined that Michael was at least treating Donna a little better than her previous love interests.

In October 2008, it was announced that Anna-Louise Plowman had been cast as Michael's wife Annalese, who would be arriving in Holby City as a consultant anaesthetist. Dhillon believes that while Michael and Annalese have their differences, they are "complements to each other [...] they understand one another, and have a deep, loving relationship." In a 2008 interview with the Holby Gazette, Dhillon stated: "I'm starting to realize that Annalese is the one person in the world - along with his children - that Michael truly loves. It may seem strange to a lot of fans, but Michael is a real family man - nothing is more important to him than his family - they make him feel secure, safe, and most importantly, successful. For Michael, there is nothing beyond family and medicine. It would be unimaginable to Michael to envision a world without his wife. He certainly would never try to hurt Annalese deliberately, but he just loves attention from women."

Series producer Diana Kyle revealed to entertainment and media website Digital Spy that in early 2009, Annalese would discover Michael's past affairs, sending her "way off course". After discovering Michael's infidelity, Annalese accidentally killed a patient during surgery. Plowman became pregnant during the filming of the storyline, so was written out of the series temporarily, leaving both Michael and her job. The plotline was left open-ended, allowing Plowman to return after taking maternity leave. She returned briefly to the programme in series eleven, when the couple's daughter Milly (Darcy Cannon) was admitted to hospital seriously injured. Michael and colleague Ric Griffin (Hugh Quarshie) saved Milly, and he and Annalese began rebuilding their relationship. Off-screen, Annalese gives birth to a son, Charlie, and in the opening episode of series twelve, Michael announced that he had become a father for the fourth time. On 4 June 2010, Kyle told Kris Green of Digital Spy that Plowman would again be reprising her role as Annalese, commenting: "The last time we saw her on screen there was practically no prospect of a loving reunion but they complement each other wonderfully. Annalese will be returning, but unfortunately someone else may come between her and Michael so I can't guarantee a loving reunion." Annalese returned on 15 June 2010, breaking up with Michael after their marriage counselling proved unsuccessful.

=== Departure and returns ===
Following the episode broadcast 17 December 2013, Daniel Kilkelly from Digital Spy reported that Dhillon had chosen to take an extended break from the role to pursue other projects. His departure storyline saw him forced to leave the hospital by Guy Self (John Michie) and Serena Campbell (Catherine Russell) after he broke strict rules surrounding liver transplants. Dhillon told Kilkelly that "I have had a wonderful time at Holby during the past six years - thank you to all the viewers for their great interest and support!"

On 19 June 2014, it was announced that Dhillion would be returning to Holby City for a short stint, and that Debbie Chazen would be joining the cast as his "partner-in-crime" Fleur Fanshawe. Michael returned during the episode broadcast on 14 October 2014 before later leaving the show again.

Holby City was cancelled in June 2021 after 23 years on air with the final episode due to be broadcast in March 2022. Producers invited multiple former cast members to reprise their roles during the show's final series. In February 2022, it was revealed that Dhillon had reprised his role and would appear in episode 1098, first broadcast on 28 February 2022. Michael returns when he interviews Dominic Copeland (David Ames) for a position at the private hospital where Michael is working as a professor.

== Storylines ==
Michael arrives at Holby City Hospital in episode "Unfinished Symphony". He begins his first day being beaten up in the hospital carpark, an attack staff nurse Donna Jackson discovers is related to his departure from his previous hospital, where he had an affair with a member of the nursing staff. Donna, and Surgical registrar Jac Naylor both vie for Michael's attention, and although he is unimpressed with Jac's underhand tactics, he and Donna begin a casual flirtation. In episode "Stolen", Michael reveals that the hospital has built a new private ward for him, to be known as HolbyCare. He attempts to convince colleague Ric Griffin to join him, and although Ric initially resists on ethical grounds, financial difficulties cause him to change his mind and agree several weeks later, in episode "The Extra Mile". Michael and Donna continue their flirtation throughout this period, and eventually kiss in episode "No Cars Go". However, they are interrupted by a phonecall from Michael's wife, Annalese, and he later brushes Donna off. Although them initially not getting on, the episode "labour of love" sees Jac and Michael casually flirting and both walking in on each other half naked. They are about to head out to lunch when they are interrupted by the new anaesthetist, Michael's wife Annalese. In August 2009, Michael was promoted to Director of Surgery over Connie Beauchamp and then served under new CEO Vanessa Lytton. He later began to share the DoS post with Ric Griffin, before he was relegated to light duties, to be replaced by Connie. Michael was then removed from the post of Joint DoS after having punched a cancer-stricken Ric in the hospital car park. New Joint DoS, Henrik Hanssen, moved Michael to head up the hospital's Acute Admissions Unit, after the death of Linden Cullen. This remained Michael's role for the next year, though he spent six months working with old friend consultant plastic surgeon Sunil Bhatti, working on a new plastic surgery unit being opened on Darwin, to replace the cardiothoracic surgery unit. After the cessation of the plastics unit, following a major scandal involving problematic cheap breast implants and the death of Bhatti, Michael tendered his resignation. Hanssen in turn then moved Michael back to Keller ward, to serve out his three month notice period.

It appeared that Michael had left Holby City on 20 December 2011 in an episode named, Half Empty, but he reappeared on 27 December 2011 in an episode set in Kyiv and agrees to return to Holby.

== Reception ==
The character's good looks were a focal point of early reviews, with Holby City series producer Diana Kyle describing Michael as "dishy [...] good-looking and sexy", and Hanna Davies of What's On TV adding that the character is "gorgeous". In September 2009, The Asian Today observed that he had become "an integral part" of the drama, "as well as acquiring an army of female fans in the process." Discussing public reaction to his character, Dhillon stated: "I get every reaction imaginable. It's what makes playing Michael a riot. [...] I find that people tend to have very strong opinions about him, and I also find that people have very detailed opinions regarding Michael, from his behaviour, attitude, even his dress sense." In 2009, Dhillon was nominated for the "Best Drama Performance" award at the National Television Awards for his role as Michael. The character's return in 2022 was well received by viewers, as reported by Lucy Buglass of What to Watch. She noted that they were "delighted" by the appearance.

Reviewing the episode "Thursday's Child", Bree Treacy of RTÉ.ie wondered if Michael's separation from Annalese would lead to a romance with Connie, commenting: "Romance is not usually a word you associate with Connie but she and [Michael] do seem to enjoy a bit of banter and it might be good to see a relationship which could mix their obvious attraction for each other with their constant need to stab each other in the back." Treacy later observed:

I think Michael is a far more interesting character solo than with Annalise [sic]. He seems to have great chemistry with which ever character he is paired with on a given week. At times he seems to have far better chemistry with Jac, Connie and/or Donna than the aforementioned curly-haired one so no major loss there.

— Bree Treacy, RTÉ.ie
