= Antony Sumara =

Antony Sumara served as the Chief Executive of the Royal Bolton Hospital NHS Foundation Trust for three months in 2010. He was educated at Aston and Birmingham universities, gaining an MBA from the latter in 1990.

Sumara had a reputation as a troubleshooter within the NHS, and previous to his appointment at Bolton, held senior positions at Mid Staffordshire NHS Foundation Trust, Bromley Hospitals Trust, Hillingdon Primary Care Trust, and the University Hospital of North Staffordshire. Within months of arriving at Hillingdon, Sumara had reduced the Trust's overspend from £2 million to £1.5 million. However, he has also courted some minor controversy, and has criticised the way hospitals are portrayed on television.

In November 2009, Sumara, then Chief Executive of the Mid Staffordshire NHS Foundation Trust, wrote a column criticizing Holby City and its sister-show Casualty for misrepresenting real hospital life.
