= Nadine Lewington =

English actress (born 1980)

- Born: 15 October 1980 (age 45); Chelmsford, Essex, England
- Education: Braintree College; Drama Studio London (BA Hons, 2003)
- Occupation: Actress
- Years active: 2005–present
- Spouse: Michael Malarkey (m. 2009)
- Children: 2

Nadine Lewington (born 15 October 1980) is an English actress. She is best known for her portrayal of Dr. Maddy Young in the BBC medical drama series Holby City.

== Early and personal life ==
Born 15 October 1980, in Chelmsford, Essex, she is the elder daughter of Tony and Sonia Lewington, and has one sister, Vania.

Lewington attended the Anglo European School in Ingatestone. She then trained at Braintree College where she gained a BTEC National Diploma in Performing Arts, and then Middlesex University's Drama Studio in London, graduating in 2003 with a BA Hons degree in Drama.

She is married to actor, singer, and songwriter Michael Malarkey, with whom she has two sons.

== Career ==
Lewington has played the roles of Maggi in drama the Dream Team and Abi Steel in the soap opera Family Affairs. She appeared in Casualty as Sasha Ryman in series 20, episode 22, titled "It's a Man Thing".

In October 2006, it was announced that Lewington had joined the cast of the BBC One medical drama Holby City as Senior House Officer Maddy Young. Her portrayal won her critical praise; within six months of arriving at Holby City, Lewington was long-listed for the "Most Popular Newcomer" award at the 2007 National Television Awards. However, in October 2007, her character also came under heavy criticism from drinks industry body the Portman Group. She was in the show for three seasons until her character was killed off in the thirty-second episode of Series 11. She also appeared in the charity telethon Children in Need, in which she, alongside her Holby City co-stars, performed a version of "Hung Up" by Madonna.

In 2008, Lewington appeared in a Holby City vs. Casualty special episode of BBC Two quiz show The Weakest Link. From July 2010, she began playing Erica Verdon in the BBC One soap opera Doctors.

In 2012, Lewington had a role in ITV drama Lewis, playing the role of Liv Nash in the episode "The Soul of Genius".

In 2016, Lewington played the role of Suzy, Jana's friend, in The CW's miniseries Containment. In January 2018, it was reported that Lewington had a recurring role as Greta Sienna in the final season of supernatural drama series The Originals.

She has modelled for fashion house Frost French, owned by Sadie Frost.

== Filmography ==
=== Film ===
Year	Title	Role	Notes
2011	All in Good Time	Ellie	Short film
2012	Tube Tube: Bonsai	Sarah	Short film
2012	Tube Tube: Second First Date	Sarah	Short film
2014	Commitment	Young Mum	Short film
2018	Bayou Caviar	Amber	
2018	Bigger	Anna Wieder	
2019	The Poison Rose	Geraldine	Post-production

=== Television ===
Year	Title	Role	Notes
2005	Family Affairs	Abi Steel	Recurring role; 9 episodes
2006	Casualty	Sarah Ryman	Episode: "It's a Man Thing"
2006	Dream Team	Maggie	Episode: "Matchmaker"
2007–2009	Holby City	Maddy Young	Main role; 100 episodes
2010–2014	Doctors	Miranda Harper / Erica Verdon	Guest role; 2 episodes
2012	Lewis	Liv Nash	Episode: "The Soul of Genius"
2012	Misfits	Lisa	Episode #4.3
2015	Kidz Time TV	Cindy Lauper	Unaired Pilot
2016	Untitled Paranormal Project	Allie Pearce	Television film
2016	Containment	Suzy	Television mini-series
2016	Salem	Rebecca Nurse	Episode: "Night's Black Agents"
2017	Lore	Johanna Kennedy Burke	Episode: "Black Stockings"
2018	The Originals	Greta Sienna	Recurring Role; 5 episodes
2019	Project Blue Book	Kelly	Episode: "Foo Fighters"
2020	Westworld	Gerhart	Episode: "The Absence of Field"
