= Joseph Byrne (Holby City) =

Fictional character from Holby City

- Holby City character
- First appearance: "Mother Love"; 3 January 2006
- Last appearance: "Episode 1102"; 29 March 2022
- Portrayed by: Luke Roberts
- Spinoff(s): HolbyBlue (2008)

In-universe information
- Occupation: General practitioner (prev. Specialist registrar, cardiothoracic surgeon)
- Family: Charles, Lord Byrne (father); Anne-Marie, Lady Byrne (mother); Harry Byrne (brother); Sophia Byrne (sister)
- Spouses: Faye Morton; Jennifer
- Significant other: Jac Naylor
- Children: Harry Byrne

Joseph Byrne is a fictional character from the BBC medical drama Holby City, portrayed by Luke Roberts. Joseph first appeared in the series eight episode "Mother Love", broadcast on 3 January 2006. Roberts had made an unrelated guest appearance in the previous series of the show, playing the relative of a deceased patient, and was asked to return in a more permanent role by the series producers.

Joseph's role in the show is that of troubled surgeon – the resultant angst of his brother's attempted suicide and his own anally retentive personality lead to the revelation the character has Obsessive–compulsive disorder (OCD). His major storylines included an accidental drugs overdose, and a relationship with fellow surgical registrar Jac Naylor (Rosie Marcel), who cheated on him with his own father. In 2019, Roberts agreed to reprise the role as part of the show's twentieth anniversary celebrations. He returned again for the show's final episode in 2022. Roberts' performance resulted in a longlist nomination for the Most Popular Newcomer award at the 2006 National Television Awards.

== Development ==
=== Creation and casting ===
Prior to joining the cast of Holby City as Joseph, Luke Roberts made a guest appearance in the series seven episode "No Pain, No Gain" as Daniel Fryer, the son of a deceased patient. Roberts was approached about returning in a more permanent role by BBC casting director Julie Harkin, who was also responsible for casting fellow newcomers Rakie Ayola as Kyla Tyson and Tom Chambers as Sam Strachan. Although his guest appearance constituted a single scene, Roberts believes it was enough to secure his call-back for the part of Joseph. He recalls that it "got the attention of the producers", and that actress Amanda Mealing, who portrayed Connie Beauchamp, "put a good word in for [him]". He felt lucky to join alongside Chambers and Rosie Marcel as Jac Naylor, due to the "feeling of solidarity" which developed between them.

As preparation for the role, Roberts observed open heart surgery at University College Hospital, London, and researched OCD. He initially attempted to look up the medical terminology in his scripts, but later abandoned this in favour of accepting help from the series medical advisers. Having become a regular Holby City viewer from the time of his appearance as Daniel, the actor had a contextual basis for storylines upon his return as Joseph, who he deemed a "very complex" character.

=== Characterisation ===
"From an early age, Joseph knew he wanted to follow in the footsteps of his father. He's meticulous and ordered to the point of obsession. He is utterly weighed down with guilt. Everyday [sic] he persecutes himself for his younger brother’s attempted suicide. But no matter how many people Joseph saves as a surgeon, he will never forgive himself."

— BBC Online.

Roberts described Joseph as an "awkward and very bookish" character, one who struggled to relate to his patients, in contrast to the "happy-go-lucky Sam", which resulted in comedy as "Sam is the antithesis of Joe." He also deemed his character "incredibly honest and morally upright", "a total oddball with all sorts of hang-ups", and as being "very stuck in his ways." During his tenure, these aspects of his characterisation have each been explored. It was revealed in Joseph's first appearance that both his father and grandfather had been pioneering cardiothoracic Consultants, and that it had always been expected of him to follow the same path. His residual guilt over his brother's attempted suicide was developed throughout his first few months at Holby City Hospital. Roberts commented on the event that: "It underpins much of his behaviour. He is a man burdened by guilt and loss. I think I can be so bold as to say he transfers many of his feelings about his brother onto patients and staff alike, without ever betraying the source of his pain." Joseph's resultant fastidiousness developed into OCD, something he attempted to control and hide by use of relaxant medication.

=== Relationships ===
Upon joining Holby City, Roberts was asked who he felt his character's ideal woman would be. He replied: "Joseph is a man who suppresses and represses his emotions – especially regarding women. I think he harbours very strong feelings of admiration for Connie but is frankly surprised and secretly thrilled when any woman shows him affection. Although so far this is rare!"

Joseph embarked on a relationship with fellow Registrar Jac, who hoped to impress Joseph's father and secure herself a promotion to Consultant. When this was not forthcoming, Jac left Joseph for Lord Byrne. Throughout series eight, Joseph cultivated a friendship with Elliot's daughter Martha, who had strong romantic feelings for him. Ultimately however, Jac won Joseph's affections and Martha left the show to return to University. From October 2007 onward, Joseph was romantically linked with Ward Sister Faye Morton (Patsy Kensit). Kensit confirmed that Faye "has a soft spot for (him)".

Faye and Joseph became engaged in series ten, much to Jac's displeasure. Roberts has relayed Marcel's insight that, "Jac's left with very little. She hasn't got the consultancy post. Joseph's father is long gone and I think she may be nostalgic for all of that. She's hankering after Joseph again. She wants him for herself." He added, on Joseph's reaction to Jac's meddling in his relationship with Faye; "He's a good guy but Jac brings out the evil in him. He does have a darker side. He will fight injustice with injustice." In the episode "Locked Away", Joseph and Jac are locked in theatre together – after being affected by an unknown poison – where they both reveal their true feelings for each other. Joseph admits that he still loves Jac, but would not take her back as she has hurt him too many times.

=== Returns ===
In 2019, Roberts and Kensit agreed to reprise their roles as Joseph and Faye as part of the show's twentieth anniversary celebrations. The production team created a special episode focused on the characters of Joseph, Faye and Jac. Roberts was happy to return to the series and stated "it's been an absolute joy to slip back into the surgical scrubs." He was also happy to reconnect with many cast members who had remained on the show since he left.

Holby City's executive producer Simon Harper branded Joseph and Faye as "two huge, iconic characters" and teased their return as a "nostalgic and exciting treat for long-term viewers." Harper described the "unique episode" as centric to the "classic Darwin trio with all their past tensions and rivalries bubbling to the surface." He added that Faye and Jac's infamous feud would be reignited because of Joseph. Jac believed Joseph was the "love of her life" and she takes his return along Faye as a personal insult. Harper concluded that with "acerbic one-liners flying thicker than a blizzard, it's quintessential Holby City."

Holby City was cancelled in June 2021 after 23 years on air. Producers invited multiple former cast members to reprise their roles during the show's final series. On 16 March 2022, it was announced that Roberts had reprised his role as Joseph for the show's final episode, which first airs on 29 March 2022. Joseph in this final episode is seen in an ambulance with one of his patients, on their way to receive a lung transplant, with the lung being donated by the brain dead Jac Naylor, who died after a stroke in Holby's final episode.

== Storylines ==
Joseph arrives at Holby City Hospital in episode "Mother Love", when he and fellow cardiothoracic surgeon Sam Strachan vie for a registrar position. Although Consultant Connie Beauchamp initially intends to hire Sam, she is persuaded by Joseph's father, Lord Byrne (Ronald Pickup), to create a second position for Joseph. He joins Connie's firm, but soon switches to work under the ward's second Consultant, Elliot Hope (Paul Bradley). The two become close, as Joseph becomes involved in Elliot's troubled family life. In turn, Joseph begins to confide in Elliot, and reveals that his brother Harry is in a coma as a result of a suicide attempt. Joseph discloses his guilt about the incident, and explains that he knew his brother was worried about exams, but ignored a telephone call from him on the evening he took an insulin overdose. As a result, he can no longer bear to hear a phone left ringing, and has developed OCD.

To cover up the symptoms of his disorder, Joseph resorts to stealing pharmacy drug Fentanyl and self-administering it before operations. In the episode "Before A Fall" he overdoses on the drug, but is saved by his colleague Jac Naylor. Shortly thereafter, they become a couple, although Joseph is unaware that Jac is only interested in him because of his father's influence. Jac manipulates Joseph into having his father add her to a surgical team flying out to Dubai to perform pioneering surgery. When things go awry there, she convinces Joseph to lie about their qualifications so that they can perform the operation themselves, which endangers both their careers, and results in their lives being threatened by the patient's influential father. In the episode "Paranoid Android" Jac begins cheating on Joseph with his own father, for a period of several months, until Lord Byrne calls an end to the deception and confesses their infidelity to his son.

Joseph quickly comes to loathe Jac, not only for cheating on him, but for breaking up his parents' marriage. Before Lord Byrne is able to secure the promotion Jac wanted from him, he dies from complications arising from a perforated stomach ulcer. When Jac attends his funeral in the episode "Bad Reputation", a furious Joseph slaps her and leaves her badly bruised. Jac continues to torment Joseph for several weeks, and flaunts the fact she inherited a ring in Lord Byrne's will that had once been promised to Joseph by his grandmother. His friend and colleague Faye Morton takes it upon herself to steal the ring, and returns it to Joseph to do with as he sees fit, in the hopes that this will allow him to move on.

Early in series ten, Joseph's brother's condition deteriorates and he is admitted to Holby City Hospital in need of an operation. Faye supports Joseph, and the two kiss. Joseph's hopes are raised when his brother opens his eyes, and he considers expensive neurology treatment in America to try and rouse Harry from his coma. Shortly thereafter, however, Harry's condition worsens again, and Joseph and his mother allow Harry to die. Following his brother's death, Joseph returns to work to find Jac on trial for Sam's old position. This reignites their feud, and Joseph is unable to block Jac from gaining the position. His relationship with Faye develops slowly, however Joseph's suspicions are raised when she lies to him about her whereabouts on several occasions, leading to the eventual discovery that the police suspect her of the murder of her second husband, Donald. An exhumation reveals that Donald did not die of cancer, as Faye insisted, but of arsenic poisoning. Joseph remains suspicious, but supports Faye as their relationship continues to develop. When Faye has a pregnancy scare, he proposes to her, and insists that he meant it even after the discovery she is not actually pregnant. Joseph is devastated when Faye appears to have stolen £5,000 from him and left the country, but discovers she is in fact in trouble in South Africa. After flying out with colleague Linden Cullen (Duncan Pow), Faye reveals she has a ten-year-old son, Archie, who lives in a care home because of a genetic disease. Joseph saves Archie's life in a risky operation, and he and Faye return from South Africa engaged once more, much to Jac's chagrin.

Despite subsequent setbacks in their relationship, such as Jac briefly deceiving Joseph into believing that she is pregnant with his child, Faye and Joseph marry. On the day of the ceremony, Linden confesses to Faye that he is in love with her, and they kiss. She instantly regrets it, however, and tells him that she loves Joseph. When Archie's nurse Lauren later accidentally administers him the wrong drug, he dies. Faye and Joseph grow apart in the aftermath and she develops romantic feelings for Linden. She and Joseph separate, but after she begins a relationship with Linden, she discovers that she is pregnant with Joseph's baby. Increasingly concerned that Faye may be a pathological liar, Linden terminates their relationship. Faye is later attacked by a heroin-addicted patient, and when Linden attempts to defend her, he is hit in the head with a glass bottle and dies. Faye suffers a breakdown in the aftermath, and is admitted to a psychiatric unit. She self-harms, and refuses to leave the unit when she goes into labour, until Jac assures her that Joseph does not intend to take their child away from her. Faye delivers a boy by Caesarean. She initially fails to bond with him, but when Joseph puts their divorce proceedings on hold, she makes an effort and names him Harry, after Joseph's deceased brother. Despite Joseph's opposition, she insists on returning to the psychiatric unit. Jac's support during this time results in a renewal of their relationship, and when Faye secretly makes plans to leave the country with Harry, Jac helps convince her to leave the baby with Joseph. Joseph struggles as a working father, and accepts a job as a GP in Penrith. Jac declines his offer to accompany him, so he departs with Harry, leaving her in tears.

Joseph returns to Holby 10 years later, where it is revealed that he and Faye have reconciled and are raising their son Harry closeby. Faye is a patient in need of a transplant and is put on Jac's list after issues at another hospital. Jac is seen to be upset by Faye's presence and by her relationship with Joseph, who tells her that it "doesn't mean I'll ever stop loving you". The emotions of the circumstance are too much for Jac who leaves the hospital in tears after kissing Joseph and telling him to never come back again. Joseph is seen to go looking for Jac for one last goodbye, but is too late.

== Reception ==
Roberts' portrayal of Joseph earned him several award nominations. In 2006, he was longlisted for the Most Popular Newcomer award at the National Television Awards (NTAs), and named the nineteenth Best Actor at the BBC Drama Awards. He was nominated in the Best Actor category at the 2007 and 2009 TVQuick and TV Choice Awards, and received a Best Drama Performance nomination at the 2010 NTAs. Bree Treacy's of RTÉ ten's rates Byrne her favorite character in the show, enjoying his love hate relationship with Jac and the intensity he brings to the show. According to her all the other storylines pale in comparison.

== In popular culture ==
On 28 February 2008, BBC Two cooking programme Ready Steady Cook broadcast a Holby City special, featuring Luke Roberts and Sharon D. Clarke (Lola Griffin). As well as competing over their cooking skills, the pair discussed their characters' upcoming storylines, and crossover with sister show HolbyBlue.
