= Hari Dhillon =

American actor

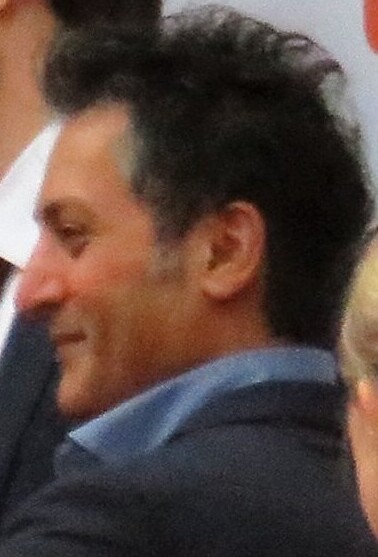
- Dhillon in 2019
- Born: 1968 (age 57–58); San Francisco, California
- Other names: Hari Dillon; Harry Dillon; Hari Jamil Dillon
- Occupation: Actor
- Years active: 1990s–present
- Television: Holby City, This is Us

Hari Dhillon (Punjabi: ਹਰੀ ਢਿੱਲੋਂ (Gurmukhi)) is an American television, film and stage actor, best known for playing Michael Spence in British television medical drama series Holby City. His name has also been spelled Hari Dillon and Harry Dillon.

== Early life and education ==
Dhillon was born and raised in San Francisco, California. He spent nine months of his childhood in India. He took one acting class at UC Berkeley in his senior year at San Francisco State University. After graduation, he worked as a prison AIDS educator in California and Hawaii before setting up a theatre company in San Francisco with friends. In 1994, he attended drama school in the United Kingdom.

== Career ==
Dhillon originally appeared in Holby City in 2001 as recurring minor character Dr. Sunil Gupta, before returning in November 2007 as consultant Michael Spence. Dhillon took an 'extended break' from Holby City on December 17, 2013, after Michael was forced to leave his post by new CEO, Guy Self (John Michie).

On June 19, 2014, it was announced Dhillon would be returning to Holby City as Michael for a short stint in late 2014. During this time, Dhillon also starred alongside Amanda Mealing on Casualty.

His appearances in US TV shows include Medium, Charmed, Without a Trace, The Loop, and Law & Order: Special Victims Unit. He also had minor, unnamed roles in the films Cradle 2 the Grave, Wit and Entrapment. He also starred in the Broadway debut of the Ayad Akhtar play, Disgraced.

== Filmography ==
=== Television ===
Year(s)	Title	Role	Notes
1997	Dream Team		
2000	Arabian Nights	Prince Hussain	
2000	Trial & Retribution		1 episode
2001	Lawless Heart		
2001	Holby City	Dr Sunil Gupta	Recurring role
2002	The Agency		1 episode
2003	She Spies		1 episode
2005	Charmed		2 episodes
2005	Medium		1 episode
2006	Mr. Nice Guy		
2007	Without a Trace		1 episode
2007	The Loop		5 episodes
2007–2013, 2014, 2022	Holby City	Michael Spence	Regular role
2014	Casualty	Michael Spence	Episode: "Entrenched"
2014	The Mentalist		1 episode
2015	Law & Order: Special Victims Unit	Attorney Varma	Episode: Granting Immunity
2015	The Mysteries of Laura	Swami Sanjay	Episode: "The Mystery of the Exsanguinated Ex"
2016	Criminal Minds: Beyond Borders	Agent Deepak Singh	Episode: Harvested
2016	Midsomer Murders	Reece Dexter	Episode: Breaking the Chain
2016	Madam Secretary	Foreign Minister/Prime Minister	Episodes: Connection Lost/ Render Safe
2017	This Is Us	Sanjay Jahiri	4 episodes
2018	Billions	Michael Panay	
2019	Death in Paradise	Jay Carver	Episode: S8:E8
2021	Alex Rider	Ed Pleasance	6 episodes
2023	The Serial Killer's Wife	Maxwell	
2025	The Chelsea Detective	Nathaniel "Marty" Sylvester	Episode: "Deadlock" (S3:E2)

=== Film ===
- Entrapment (1999)
- New World Disorder (1999)
- Wit (2001)
- Cradle 2 the Grave (2003)
- Bad Education (2019)
- Doom: Annihilation (2019)
- The Beanie Bubble (2023)
- We Strangers (2024)
- Trigger Warning (2024)

=== Theatre ===
- Mother Teresa Is Dead (2002), Royal Court Theatre, London
- Drifting Elegant (2004), Magic Theatre, San Francisco
- A Perfect Wedding (2004), Kirk Douglas Theatre, Los Angeles
- Morbidity and Mortality (2006), Magic Theatre, San Francisco
- Charles L. Mee's A Perfect Wedding, which was the inaugural production of the Kirk Douglas Theatre in Los Angeles
- Original production of Stephen Belber's Drifting Elegant at San Francisco's Magic Theatre, which was later developed into a feature film
- Broadway debut of the Ayad Akhtar play, Disgraced.

== Awards and nominations ==
Dhillon was nominated to the long-list of the 2010 National Television Awards in the category for "Best Drama Performance".
