= Acute medical unit =

Hospital department

An acute medical unit (AMU) is a short-stay department in some British, Irish, Australian and New Zealand hospitals that may be linked to the emergency department, but functions as a separate department. The AMU acts as a gateway between a patient's general practitioner, the emergency department, and the wards of the hospital. The AMU helps the emergency department produce a healthy turnaround for patients, helping with the four-hour waiting rule in the United Kingdom. An AMU is usually made up of several bays and has a small number of side-rooms and treatment rooms. They are fully equipped with emergency medical treatment facilities including defibrillators and resuscitation equipment.

== Patients ==
From the emergency department, patients can be moved to AMU where they will undergo further tests and stabilisation before they are transferred to the relevant ward or sent home. Also, patients can be admitted straight to AMU from their general practitioner if he or she believes the patient needs hospital treatment. A patient's stay in the unit is limited, usually no more than 48 hours.

The AMU deals with admissions only, patients will never be transferred from a ward to the AMU. Surgical procedures are not carried out in the unit either; these are referred on to the relevant theatre such as cardiothoracics and general surgery.

== Staff ==
Senior staff in an AMU typically include a consultant in acute medicine, general medicine, emergency medicine, or critical care. Often a registrar in general medicine, and a ward sister or a charge nurse have roles in the unit. A number of staff nurses work alongside the senior staff to provide care to patients in the unit.

Although AMU has its own staff trained to deal with patients and provide care, members of staff from other departments in the hospital are needed in AMU to assess patients and provide further diagnosis. Typical examples of staff who may be needed in AMU are general surgeons, cardiothoracic surgeons, cardiologists, and a psychiatric liaison nurse.

== Alternative names for the department ==
=== Current ===
The name "acute medical unit" is recommended by the Royal College of Physicians in its 2007 acute medicine report. Despite this, many hospitals use different names for the department. Common names for this department are:

- Acute Assessment Unit (AAU)
- Acute Admissions Unit (AAU)
- Acute Medical Unit (AMU)
- Assessment and Diagnostic Unit (ADU)
- Children's Acute Assessment Unit (CAA)
- Emergency Assessment Unit (EAU)
- Emergency Care Unit (ECU)
- Medical Assessment and Planning Unit (MAPU) - in Australia and New Zealand

=== Former names ===
- Emergency Medical Assessment/Admissions Unit (EMAU)
- Medical Assessment Unit (MAU)

== See also ==
- Emergency department
- Emergency medicine
- Hospital
