= Portman Group =

UK alcohol producers trade group

- Formation: 1989
- Location: Millbank Tower, London, UK
- Region served: UK
- Members: 15 alcoholic beverage companies
- Chief Executive: Matt Lambert
- Chair: Nick Baird
- Website: Portman Group

The Portman Group is a trade group composed of alcoholic beverage producers and brewers in the UK.

== History ==
It was set up in 1989 as part of a campaign to raise awareness on alcohol-related issues, and its members account for the majority of alcohol products sold in the UK. It takes its name from the Portman Square, London, head office of Guinness, one of its co-founders.

=== Drinkaware Trust ===
The Portman Group established the Drinkaware website in 2004 and went on to establish the Drinkaware Trust in 2006. The Drinkaware Trust is now an independent trust which runs all alcohol education campaigns that had previously been the responsibility of the Portman Group.

== Aims ==
There are four stated main aims of the group:

- Promote responsible drinking (and thus lessen binge drinking)
- Help prevent misuse of alcohol
- Encourage alcohol marketing and advertising
- Put forward the industry angle on the understanding of alcohol-related issues.

== Code of Practice on the Responsible Naming, Packaging and Promotion of Alcoholic Drinks ==
The Portman Group operates a Code of Practice on the Naming, Packaging and Promotion of Alcoholic Drinks which was first introduced in 1996. The code, which is supported throughout the industry, seeks to ensure that drinks are marketed in a socially responsible way and to an adult audience only.

The code applies to all pre-packaged alcoholic drinks and covers the drink's naming, packaging, point-of-sale advertising, brand websites, sponsorship, branded merchandise, advertorials, press releases and sampling.

The code has an open and accessible complaints system. Complaints under the Code are ruled on by an independent complaints panel.

== Members ==
- Asahi Breweries
- Aston Manor Cider
- Bacardi
- Brown-Forman
- Budweiser
- C&C Group
- Campari Group
- Diageo
- Heineken
- Jägermeister
- Mark Anthony Brands International
- Molson Coors
- SHS Drinks
- Pernod Ricard
- Thatchers Cider

== Campaigns ==
There have been several full campaigns run by the group. These include:

- "I'll be Des" (designated drivers)
- "If you do do drink, don't do drunk" and Drinkaware.co.uk (excessive drinking, particularly in the under 24s)
- Proof of Age Card (aka Prove It) (a PASS-accredited identity card, discontinued in 2007)

These campaigns have been strongly criticised by, amongst others, Professor Ian Gilmore of the Royal College of Physicians and Professor Martin Plant of the University of the West of England, both noted alcohol harm experts, as not only ineffective but even favourable to the alcohol industry.

Public Health England was attacked by Martin McKee and others for giving unwarranted credibility to the drinks industry by involving Drinkaware in their Drink Free Days campaign in 2018. Professor Ian Gilmore resigned from his position with the agency when they refused to break the connection.

== See also ==
- British Beer and Pub Association
- Wine and Spirit Trade Association
- Alcohol Health Alliance UK
- Alcohol Concern
- Challenge 21
