= Holby City series 11 =

Holby City
- Series 11
- No. of episodes: 52

Release
- Original network: BBC One
- Original release: 21 October 2008 – 13 October 2009

Series chronology
- ← Previous; Series 10 Next → Series 12

The eleventh series of the British medical drama television series Holby City commenced airing in the United Kingdom on BBC One on 21 October 2008, and concluded on 13 October 2009.

== Episodes ==
No. overall	No. in series	Title	Directed by	Written by	Original release date	Viewers (millions)
421	1	"Lazarus"	Edward Bazalgette	Dan Sefton	21 October 2008	5.21
Connie is shocked to find out that her lover John is married to Jayne after their son Christian fell into a river and brought to Holby. Elsewhere, Chrissie returns to Holby but can she put the past incidents behind her and move on.
422	2	"Or I'll Never Fall in Love"	Edward Bazalgette	Nick Warburton	28 October 2008	5.00
Joseph realises he has upset Faye and resolves how to fix it. Chrissie has to come to terms with her decision to leave nursing. Elsewhere, Connie struggles to end her relationship with John because of her friendship and working relationship with his wife Jayne.
423	3	"Labour Of Love"	Daikin Marsh	Karen Laws	4 November 2008	5.69
Joseph had a disastrous morning with Archie, Faye's son, as he fails to connect with him so goes into work on his day off. But it goes from bad to worse when Jac manoeuvres him out of assisting in a major operation performed by Michael and Elliott. Leaving to go home he becomes trapped in a lift with Daisha whose waters break. Meanwhile, Donna does her best to get herself on the surgical rotation as a scrub nurse but is turned down at all attempts until Sam takes pity on her but it ends up delaying her which in turn delays Maria's first meeting with Aaron's parents. Elsewhere, Michael's wife Annalese begins as an anesthetist at Holby.
424	4	"We Said Some Things"	Daikin Marsh	Abi Bown	11 November 2008	5.66
Daisha's baby decides to be born in the stalled lift and it is a struggle for Joseph to stay calm as he takes on the role of midwife and tries to deliver the baby with help from Elliott by phone. Afterwards, Daisha cannot bear to be near her newborn son. Meanwhile, Michael finds himself slotted to be in the operating theatre with his anesthetist wife Annalese and he's far from happy and goes about changing the rotation data but he ends up with a maverick anesthetist which puts a patient in danger and he has no option but to have Annalese take over. Linden's ground-breaking research is given short shift by the board and Maddie fails to get her Keller rotation
425	5	"Cutting the Cord"	Rob Evans	Veronica Henry	18 November 2008	5.43
The new and revamped Keller Ward opens amid a champagne reception but it doesn't go smoothly for Ric after that as his main benefactor collapses at the function and then he has to operate in the dark. Faye grows concerned over Joseph's attachment to Daisha's son Joe and confronts him about his desire to have children. Elsewhere, whilst playing around with old equipment in theatre, anesthetist Jamie Norton manages to shock himself and ends up killing himself after the stunt goes wrong.
426	6	"The Weaker Sex"	Rob Evans	Graham Mitchell	25 November 2008	5.57
Faye tells Joseph she is leaving him which shocks him so much he finds solace in the bar and finally in Jac's waiting arms. Meanwhile, Linden is reminded of his daughter Holly when he treats a young patient.
427	7	"About Last Night"	Christopher King	Fiona Evans	2 December 2008	5.34
Maria and Donna continue to be at loggerheads and it is not helped when Donna tells Maria she saw Sam pensive in the car-park and overheard that perhaps his cancer had returned - which angers Sam when he hears it. Meanwhile, Annalese applies for the anesthetists job but Michael appeared not to be too keen to recommend her. When she misses her interview because of an emergency procedure Ric is impressed and gives her the job on the spot. Elsewhere, Joseph tries to forget his night with Jac; Kyla tenders her resignation so that she can accompany her son to Rotterdam; Linden tries to give a comatose Callie Taylor everything she needs to speed up her recovery and Maria meets a young American in the bar unknown to her that he is Sam's son.
428	8	"Sweet Bitter Love"	Christopher King	Mark Clompus	9 December 2008	5.70
Ric's world is rocked when a junkie patient reveals that she was his dead son Leo's girlfriend Michelle and that he is a grandfather. Abra turned up at Holby on Kyla's last day and asked her to come to Ghana with him instead of going to Rotterdam with her son. Maddy tries to encourage Linden as he loses faith when Callie Taylor's prognosis worsens. Daisha struggles to cope with her baby despite Mark's help and decides to put Joe up for adoption. Sam offers to let Kieron come and stay with him after he tells him he doesn't want to goback to New York and his musical career. . Guest Appearance of Adrian Edmondson as Percy 'Abra' Durant. Kyla Tyson departs
429	9	"This Be The Verse"	James Larkin	Joe Ainsworth	16 December 2008	5.65
Ric receives a photo of his grandson in the post and ends up juggling his job with sleuthing to track Michelle down. Sam decided he wanted to make up for lost time with Maria and apologised for not realising how much he liked her before. He later tells her about his son Keiron but Maria panics as Keiron has been pursuing her. Daisha finds a prospective couple to adopt Joe but will Mark puts a spanner in the works?
430	10	"Maria's Christmas Carol"	Bill MacLeod	Tony McHale	23 December 2008	5.50
Maria visits a psychic and then experiences the Ghosts of her Christmas Past, Present & Future which shows her why her mother gave her up for adoption and how she regretted it and also helped decide her future with Sam. Sam made the decision to leave Holby and left to go to New York with Kieron but promised to come back for Maria. Sam Strachan Departs
431	11	"Not in the Stars"	James Larkin	Jake Riddell	30 December 2008	5.54
Callie Taylor stirs from her coma shortly after Linden asks her husband to decide on whether a DNR should be decided on if her condition gets worse. Michelle contacts Ric and asks for his support in getting her son, and his grandson, Billy back from social services. Daisha decides against adoption of Joe and Joseph is missing Faye and the situation is not helped with Jac and her behaviour around him.
432	12	"No Word of Farewell"	Ben Morris	Peter Lloyd	6 January 2009	5.84
Daisha goes missing with her son Joe and Mark comes under investigation in the police's search for her. Faye tries to avoid Joseph at work but Elliott has a plan to get them together again. Meanwhile, Annalese brings a proposal to cut waiting times to Michael who shows it to Ric thinking he'll reject it but Ric thinks it a brilliant idea.
433	13	"Clean Slate"	Ben Morris	Martha Hillier	12 January 2009	5.83
Ric is surprised by the identity of a new medical student. Joseph has to make it up to Faye after missing Archie's christening, and Rachel is left to look after baby Joe.
434	14	"Just"	Farren Blackburn	Ian Kershaw	20 January 2009	5.61
Linden's longing for Faye continues and he attempts to tell her how he feels until a comment from Callie Taylor stops him doing so. Meanwhile, Ric, Connie and Michael operate on a female Holby security guard who was stabbed by a drug dealer. She later died but controversy ensued when her attacker was brought in and Ric had to operate. Ric also begins a Zero Tolerance Policy towards his patients who won't help themselves which makes him decide not to operate on an obese man. Elsewhere, Jac continued to get at Joseph and gets him to suspect that she may be pregnant? But is she and what is her ultimate plan?
435	15	"Breaking News"	Farren Blackburn	David Lawrence	26 January 2009	5.80
Connie announces a ground-breaking heart surgery operation on a prominent politician without Ric's knowledge. Ric goes to the board about Connie but gets vetoed on his complaint and she gets the go ahead with the operation. But Ric gets the upper hand later at the press conference when he congratulates his team rather than Connie directly - and she isn't pleased. Tom O'Dowd gets very drunk and ends up in the crèche with Saskia, a crèche worker, and is spotted leaving the following morning by Maddy. When it transpires that the encounter was caught on camera Maddy helps Tom out with getting rid of the incriminating evidence so that he or Saskia won't be caught.
436	16	"Tough Love"	Robert Del Maestro	Dana Fainaru	3 February 2009	6.37
Ric announces his new Zero Tolerance Policy at Lindsey Jones's memorial service without advising Jayne or any of the Board. He further angered her when he took issue with one of Michael's overweight patients due to have a hernia operation. Elsewhere, Jac continues to wind Joseph up with tidbits on whether she is pregnant or not. Maria becomes evasive with Donna over calls she keeps receiving.
437	17	"Trust"	Robert Del Maestro	Chris Murray	10 February 2009	5.64
Annalese opens one of Michael's credit card statements and finds a travel entry for over £3,000 and then catches him flirting with Donna. She checks his email and finds that he is travelling to Rome which she was unaware of but later Michael manages to explain it by saying he's going to a conference. But she gets suspicious again when she finds a travel book on Rome in Donna's locker. Connie wasted no time in reminding Ric that it was his last day as Director of Surgery under their six-month agreement and hassled him to resign. He tells her he has to give three months notice but Connie later found out he hadn't done so. When a case comes in under Connie that she is sure to rise his Zero Tolerance hackles she doesn't hesitate to contact him. Daisha celebrates her 30th birthday and Mark realises he feels more for her than friendship.
438	18	"Truth and Mercy"	Michael Buffong	Nick Warburton	17 February 2009	5.57
Connie and Ric continue to be at odds all day - this time over the treatment of Frankie Moore, the overweight son of a man he'd refused to treat under his Zero Tolerance Policy. Connie turned it into a political battle by encouraging Frankie to have a gastric band, which Ric thought was unsuitable and the easy way out. Elsewhere, everyone believed that Jac was pregnant and she wasn't making Joseph's life any easier. He arranged for her to get an exclusive job in India to get her out of the way but he sussed her plan. Meanwhile, Daisha struggled whilst dealing with an eccentric patient and worried that she was being a bad mother to Joe.
439	19	"Take Her Breath Away"	Michael Buffong	Darren Guthrie	24 February 2009	5.44
Michael operates on Frankie Moore but his father is none too pleased with the huge bill from Holby Care telling Connie that Ric never told him he would have to pay. Joseph starts to have nightmares and panic attacks over Jac's potential announcement in the bar. Convinced that Jac is pregnant he was determined to tell Faye but is unable to speak to her before they all gathered in the bar. He then burst into the bar just as Jac was about to reveal her big secret and dragged Faye out and told her about Jac. But Jac's announcement is that she has got a paper published and got herself a scholarship to study for a research PhD. Faye is enraged with Joseph after he tells her about Jac. Elsewhere, Rachel believes Daisha is suffering from post-natal depression and tells Mark. Chrissie arrived back to work with Michael in Holby Care. Chrissie Williams returns.
440	20	"Exposures"	Christopher King	Al Smith	3 March 2009	5.93
Faye finds out from Linden that he knew that Joseph slept with Jac. Michael tells Donna that a patient is blackmailing him to do her hiatus hernia surgery by keyhole and if he doesn't she is going to tell Annalese of his affair with his former nurse. Chrissie starts back in Holby in the Holby Care Suite. Elliott's daughter Martha arrives back with a husband in tow who is rushed to the E.D. Annalese sees Donna wearing the chain Michael gave her previously and realizes that he had an affair with her.
441	21	"Feet of Clay"	Christopher King	Michael Levine	9 March 2009	5.52
Maddy, Maria, Donna and Tom all have massive hangovers after a night out. A suspicious Annalese confronted Michael about Donna's necklace. Michael managed to talk his way out of it but Annalese kept investigating and found him in another lie with a telephone call whom he said was Ric but in fact was Donna. Ric ruffled Connie's feathers with his Zero-Tolerance policy. Ric made a presentation to a prominent politician with statistics on Zero Tolerance compiled by Tom. But are Tom's figures the correct ones. Elsewhere, Elliot and Martha clash over her new husband. A hungover Maddy angered Linden with her attitude but she still got her surgical rotation on Keller.
442	22	"Coming Back to Bite You"	James Larkin	Claire Bennett	17 March 2009	5.76
Jac is knocked over by Elliott's dog and is treated by Linden who sees a baby scan picture in her Filofax. He correctly guessed that she planned to lure Joseph with it and he later tells this to Faye. A jealous Annalese asked Donna if she slept with Michael. Donna denies it but Annalese doesn't believe her. Later, Michael denies sleeping with Donna but eventually Annalese wears him down and he confesses to the one night he spent with Donna. Just then they are called into an emergency surgery and during it Annalese tells Michael she is leaving him. Annalese was distracted and unknowingly made a mistake with the anesthetic and the patient died. Too late Annalese realized it was her fault and told Michael afterwards. Chrissie got annoyed with Daisha and told her it was time she stood on her own two feet. Daisha told Mark she was moving out, so Mark told Chrissie about Daisha's difficult situation. Chrissie encouraged Daisha to go back to counseling.
443	23	"Breathe Deeply"	James Larkin	Joe Ainsworth	24 March 2009	5.56
Annalese got upset when she saw the dead patient's widow and was about to confess her mistake to Jayne when Michael talked her out of it. He told her there was no evidence. Ric extended Zero Tolerance to his staff with voluntary breathalyser tests which Annalese failed. Michael spun a tale and Ric agreed not to fire her if she agreed to be monitored. Later, Mrs Hewitt's lawyer claimed the statistics that Ric had presented in his meeting with a politician were fictitious and threatened Ric with a formal enquiry. Ric told Tom if he didn't prove the data was genuine there would be hell to pay. Elliot's acceptance of Ben hit a new low when he discovered photos of "strippers" on Ben's laptop but Martha pointed out they were arty photos from Vegas but Elliot was sceptical. Faye decided she wanted to get back with Joseph but a stunned Joseph asked for time to think about it and then left Faye a letter saying he'd love to get back with her before he went into theatre. Whilst operating Dr. Greene and another member of staff passed out and crashed to the floor.
444	24	"Locked Away"	Robert Del Maestro	Graham Mitchell	31 March 2009	5.94
Darwin is struck with an unknown chemical contamination which claims the life of anaesthetist Marianne Teague and seriously endangers the lives of Jac and Joseph who stay behind mid-operation. Jac confesses to Joseph her feelings for him thinking that this could have been their last moments together but in the end he chooses Faye after they find the source of the contamination. Elsewhere, Daisha was having more problems with Mark as she was trying to make holiday plans for her and Joe. And then to her delight her sister turned up out of the blue. Meanwhile, Connie became suspicious of Annalese as she started to panic over the mistake with her dead patient.
445	25	"Careful What You Wish For"	Robert Del Maestro	Samina Baig	7 April 2009	5.48
Faye and Joseph make plans for their wedding which upsets Jac but who refuses to wear her heart on her sleeve. Connie becomes suspicious of Annaliese during surgery and finally gets to the bottom of it. Seeing that Annaliese was responsible for Mr. Hewitt's death she goes to Jayne who decides to bring charges against Annaliese and come clean to the Hewitt's. Meanwhile, Martha tries in vain to get her dad Elliott to like Ben which leads to Elliott's beloved dog getting run over by an ambulance. An upset Elliott refuses to take him to the vets and instead takes him home.
446	26	"Too Much to Ask"	David Innes Edwards	Abi Bown	14 April 2009	5.36
Annaliese is suspended whilst the investigation into her part in the Hewitt death is investigated with both Michael and Ric struggling to get her to fight for her career. Elliott puts his job on the line so that he can operate on his beloved dog Samson. Joseph refuses to help him but Jac sees no problem and assists him but what will she want in return? Elsewhere, Tom goes out of his way to impress Ric but succeeds in doing the opposite.
447	27	"No Legacy So Rich"	David Innes Edwards	Paul Campbell	21 April 2009	5.14
Ric tells Maddy and Tom that he is doing random breath tests on them and Maddy tries in vain to get Tom sorted before the test. In the meantime Tom's father Ken goes to see Ric about his son and asking him to give him a second chance but Ric inadvertently tells Ken about Tom's past drug problems believing that he already knew. Ken tells Tom that he is cutting him off and leaves. Then to add salt to his wounds Ric tells him that he is terminating his rotation at the hospital. He later has a heart-attack at the wheel and Ric operates but tells Tom that there is little hope that Ken will recover. Tom leaves Holby when Ken dies and tells Ric that it was his drugs that killed his son Leo. Joseph's sister Sophia tries to cajole Faye and Joseph into having a big wedding. Joseph queries why she really is at the hospital and she admits that she has been having an affair with the caterer from her wedding who is a patient at Holby. Lalaine continues to overstay her welcome at Mark's.
448	28	"Running on Empty"	Dominic Keavey	Abby Ajayi	28 April 2009	5.11
Because of Maddy's close association with Tom it now appears that it may jeopardize her career and an over-eager fifth year medical student doesn't make it any easier. Elsewhere, Daisha has to make a very tough decision about Joe when her sister Lalaine has to return home. Meanwhile, Connie tells Michael that the Trust will settle the Hewitt civil suit which will undoubtedly cost Annaliese her career and if he fights the Trust they will bring him down too.
449	29	"Smoke and Mirrors"	Dominic Keavey	Sebastian Baczkiewicz	5 May 2009	4.88
Annalese collapses at the gym and is brought in to AAU where she pleads with them not to tell Michael. But Michael finds out but before he can get to Annalese Connie tells Annalese the truth about the Hewitt case which further damages her relationship with Michael. Donna is distracted after hearing Annalese in on the ward and finds Michael and tells him she knows about Annalese's pregnancy - a fact Michael didn't know but which he manages to conceal from Donna. He berates her for getting involved in his business. Then Annalese tells Michael that she is leaving him and that she is expecting a boy. Meanwhile, Maddy wanted to apply for a Keller fellowship promotion but needed Ric's support which she initially fails to get. Ric later approved her application but lets her know that it is either her job or her social life. Elsewhere, Rachel gets transferred to Geratrics and Chrissie exposes Mark's feelings for Daisha when he forgets Trisha's anniversary.
450	30	"Mirror, Mirror"	Lance Kneeshaw	Darren Guthrie	12 May 2009	5.28
Maddy's estranged sister Hannah arrives back in Holby with trouble in tow in the form of her old cell-mate who has been stabbed. She secretly treated her but found herself in hot water with Ric when he found out. She later learnt that she would no longer be interviewed for the new fellowship on Keller because of her actions. Michael's family problems with Annalese were affecting his work. He left theater early to tend to his sick daughter. On his way out Connie cornered him and questioned his career commitment, which lead to a heated argument and then another one with Donna. But Donna persisted and finally wore him down and brought him out for drinks. He later decided to take a vacation. Meanwhile, Elliot put Ben through a battery of tests but which came up clear but he suspected that Ben wasn't telling him the truth. Later Ben admitted he was having problems with his vision but he didn't want Elliot to tell Martha. Elliot booked him an appointment with an optomologist.
451	31	"Seeing Other People"	Lance Kneeshaw	Dan Sefton	19 May 2009	5.50
Fed up with seeing her Dad's obvious affection for Daisha Chrissie makes Daisha see what everyone else sees. Daisha tells Mark she is moving in with Maria. Joseph and Faye ask Elliott to give her away at their wedding and for Linden to be Joseph's best man. Annoyed that she was cut from the Fellowship interviews Maddie considers leaving but her help with a transplant patient makes Ric see her in a new light and he invites her for a late interview. On her way to the interview she encounters Chantelle Tanner in the bathroom who stabs her and leaves her on the bathroom floor.
452	32	"Just a Perfect Day"	Fraser MacDonald	Dan Sefton	26 May 2009	4.14
After her stabbing Maddy was determined to recover and secure an interview with Ric for the Keller Fellowship. However, when Maddy discovered Ric wasn't keen in interviewing her she didn't see any future at Holby. Luckily she met Dan Clifford, who offered her a research position. Maddy was torn between Holby and this new opportunity - but it was all too late. Maddy had died from her stab wound and everything had just been a dream. Death of Maddy Young. Guest Appearance of Peter Wingfield as Dan Clifford.
453	33	"What Will Survive of Us"	Fraser MacDonald	Dana Fainaru	2 June 2009	5.36
Linden asks Maria to speak at Maddy's memorial service in the bar but she finds the task a difficult one. Elsewhere, Jac gets out of her depth when she takes over an operation from Joseph to distract herself from his upcoming nuptials. Meanwhile, Martha struggles to copy with some alarming news about Ben when he is sent for neurological tests.
454	34	"Proceed With Caution"	Jim Loach	Tony McHale	9 June 2009	5.79
It's Faye and Joseph's wedding day and a surprise for Joseph when he learns he is getting married in his family home. But the wedding throws up a few surprises with Joseph's former girlfriend Elizabeth Farrington showing up and getting drunk and very jealous that he is now with Faye. Faye finally reconciles with her parents David and Lindsey after a ten-year silence and learns from her mother that Faye's grandmother had a Low-syndrome son who died, the same disease that her son Archie suffers from. Later, a drunk Linden tells Faye that he is in love with her and they kiss and are discovered by Sophia who leaves before she is seen. Joseph becomes enraged that his ex-girlfriend Elizabeth had an affair with his dead brother which Sophia knew about. Meanwhile, back at Holby Jac takes out her misery, of not being able to get Joseph to change his mind about marrying Faye, on a group of new house officers including brother and sister Oliver and Penny Valentine. First Appearance of Penny and Oliver Valentine.
455	35	"The Honeymoon's Over"	Michael Buffong	Martha Hillier	15 June 2009	5.26
Ben and Martha receive the shocking news that there is no hope of saving his sight and are now forced to confront the grim realisation of Ben's condition and where their relationship goes from here. Ben confesses to Elliott that he doesn't want his illness to ruin Martha's life but Martha is determined to stand by Ben despite his objections. Meanwhile, Faye lies to Joseph about Linden and Penny incurs the wrath of Ric. Jane, infuriated by the low morale of the hospital, tells Ric she is re-advertising his job of Director of Surgery and now targets Connie for the post.
456	36	"Attachments"	Michael Buffong	Chris Murray	22 June 2009	5.13
Linden is finding it extremely hard to move on from his deep love for Faye. Hurt and confused, he decided to throw himself into his work with the new F1's, which include Oliver, but finds himself taking out his frustration especially on Oliver. Elsewhere, Penny tries to assert herself after being spurred on by a sense of competition and refuses to heed Daisha. Meanwhile, Elliott celebrates his 50th birthday with a surprise party in the Bar as Martha decides to go traveling when Ben decides to stay with his mother. Elliott also reacquaints himself with old friend Tara Sodi.
457	37	"Smoke Without Fire"	Paul Gibson	David Lawrence	30 June 2009	5.46
Annaliese tells Michael she wants a break from him and is moving to France for the summer holidays. Tara tries to talk to Elliott about their past but Elliott asks her to leave the past in the past. Anxious that the Director of Surgery job hadn't been advertised, Connie confronted Jayne in her office and discovers that Jayne believes her husband John, and Connie's secret ex-lover, is having an affair. A guilty Connie probed if Jayne had any proof and when Connie challenged John later she discovered he had been having an affair, but with someone else. Later, at Michael's house his daughter Millie is taken to hospital after falling and Michael is stunned to see Ric at the house also.
458	38	"Your Cheating Heart"	Paul Gibson	David Lawrence	7 July 2009	4.94
Elliott and Jac disagree on the treatment for their patient Honeysuckle McKenzie at the same time that Tara Sodi asks him to assist her on the same surgery they first did years earlier. Jac plays Elliott off against Connie on the treatment for Honeysuckle and when Connie finds out she tells Jac that if she ever does that again it will be the end of her career. Michael faced the most important operation of his life on his daughter Milly. When Milly's treatment goes wrong, Michael buckles and Ric steps in to save her life. Things got worse when he caught Ric with Annalese and discovered that she had abdominal pains. But after a scan confirmed everything was alright Michael started to try and patch things up with Annalese. Elsewhere, Jayne's husband John confronts Connie about Jane's suspicions of an affair which causes Connie to tell John what she really thinks unaware that Jayne has seen the confrontation. Connie confesses all to Jayne and tells her that he is involved with another woman. Jayne tells Connie that their professional relationship will not be affected by Connie's affair.
459	39	"Body Language"	Rob Evans	Justin Young	14 July 2009	5.30
Donna comes face-to-face with a surprising patient on Keller - her father Derek Newman. Derek is assessed by Ric and told that he has cancer but Ric believes it is treatable by operation based on scans he has. Elsewhere, sparks fly between Daisha and Oliver as he lands her in trouble with an anxiety patient who threatens to put in a complaint about her. This lands Oliver in trouble with both Mark and Linden.
460	40	"A Glass Half Full"	Rob Evans	Veronica Henry	21 July 2009	5.42
Ric tells Donna that he has got the results of the PET scan which shows that the cancer in Derek's body has spread further than earlier tests had indicated and it is inoperable at this stage. Unwilling to believe this she knowingly loses the scans and blames Penny for them and so gets another set done and gets Michael to look at them but Michael confirms that there is no change to the earlier scans so she and Michael tell Derek the diagnosis and Donna vows to be there for her Dad throughout his illness. Chrissie struggles to hide her feelings for Oliver and Penny is thwarted at her every move by Jac but Elliott seeing Jac take credit for Penny's diagnosis invites her to be part of the lab team on the valve replacement he is doing with Tara.
461	41	"Future Perfect"	Jamie Annett	Peter Lloyd	28 July 2009	5.20
Jayne asked a reluctant Elliot and Tara to conduct a press conference to raise the profile of their valve operation on Lucy. Elliot's reluctance stems from his former patient, Katie Landis, who died from this procedure 25 years previously and which now made Elliott the surgeon he was - cautious. Just before the press conference Katie's distraught parents demanded that Elliott cancel the publicity or they'd tell the world about their daughter's death. At the press conference Elliot finally managed to win them round and save his and Tara's forthcoming operation. Meanwhile, Ric has an attack of conscience over his decision about Donna's father's treatment and decided to go with an operation. Elsewhere, Joseph and Faye had their first spat when he discovered transactions on their credit card which he considered exorbitant and which he assumed Faye spent. When Faye queried it she found that the card had been cloned but the rift had already started to widen between them.
462	42	"My Girl"	Jamie Annett	Joe Ainsworth	4 August 2009	5.48
The new chairman of Holby Trust, Terence Cunningham, arrived for an impromptu visit of Holby where an excited Oliver managed to do some minor damage to his hand. Connie was told by Jayne to put Joseph on her operating schedule instead of Jac as Terence was a friend of the Byrne family, much to Jac's displeasure. But Jac got one up on Connie when she managed to get back an important piece of equipment needed for the operation which Joseph failed to do. Donna's dad Derek disappeared on the day of his operation and Donna eventually found him under the stairs, drunk with a bottle of whiskey. Taking matters into her own hands Donna attempted to flush out his system but Ric found out. Derek's operation and Donna's job were now both at risk. Then Derek's condition deteriorated badly and had to be rushed to theatre. Michael and Ric operated and he survived but his life was hanging in the balance. Oliver became interested in Daisha and less interested in Chrissie.
463	43	"These Arms of Mine"	Jim Loach	Abi Bown	11 August 2009	5.04
On the day of Elliot and Tara's big valve operation on Lucy Miller Elliot lost his confidence in the operation and ordered more tests and asked to delay the procedure. But a displeased Tara wouldn't agree to deferring the surgery and replaced him with Joseph as Lucy's condition started deteriorating. Joseph tried his best, but he was not up to the task and thus forced Elliot to face up to his fears and he finally stepped in to save the day and Lucy. Meanwhile, Donna had to make the decision to turn off her father's life support when tests showed that his condition had not improved and was unlikely to. Elsewhere, following an erroneous email from Oliver to Chrissie and which was meant for Penny, Chrissie put Oliver through hoops in his evaluations. But Chrissie finally succumbed to his charms in the Bar.
464	44	"The Blind Side"	Jim Loach	Andrew Holden	18 August 2009	5.01
Brian Coley, a terminally ill patient informed Elliot before surgery that he had a living will which stated DNR - Do Not Resuscitate. When the operation went badly Elliot stood back, but Tara stepped in and resuscitated him. Brian threatened to sue, but Tara managed to talk him round. Elliot finally told Tara about his wife Gina's assisted suicide, and a shocked Tara reconsidered her future in Holby. Meanwhile, Connie has to tell an elderly private patient that his much desired surgery may kill him. Connie decides to go ahead despite Ric's objections and unfortunately the patient doesn't survive. Linden steps down from the interview stage of Director of Surgery and tells Connie he thinks Ric is the best man for the job. Elsewhere, a drunk patient on AAU lashes out at Oliver and which Chrissie insists in patching up. Oliver and Chrissie discuss their relationship.
465	45	"Reformation"	Christopher King	Ian Kershaw	25 August 2009	5.03
Ric's day goes from bad to worse when a newspaper article exposes Ric's operation on Donna's father which went against his own strict procedures. Jayne demanded that he write a press release. Joseph continued to be suspicious of Faye and is only further intensified when a patient displays intense suspicious tendencies about her boyfriend. Daisha recommends a hearing impaired patient for Penny for her portfolio assessment but when Ric couldn't supervise her because of his worsening day she nearly ends up messing up the procedure. A thalidomide patient is diagnosed with inoperable cancer but refuses to believe it is the end and pressures Ric for other ways of extending his life but the only procedure that may work is giving the patient doses of thalidomide - the drug that caused him to be born with deformed limbs. After nearly losing a patient Ric decides that he'd prefer to help patients by being a doctor and withdraws from the Director of Surgery job much to Jayne's horror.
466	46	"Faithful"	Christopher King	Graham Mitchell	1 September 2009	5.26
Joseph finds out that Faye is lying to him about her ex-husband and her contact with him on the night of their wedding and so hacks into her mobile phone account and finds out that it was Linden she was talking to and not Lucas. Joseph confronts her at the Bar and when she doesn't deny it he walks away. Donna is finding it hard to come to terms with her dad's death as Maria tries to contact Sam to no avail. Connie and Michael both interview for the Director of Surgery job but were both disappointed with their interviews. Still it comes as a huge shock to Connie when Jayne gave Michael the job. She forces Jayne to admit that it was her involvement with John that caused her to back Michael. Connie tells Michael she is resigning which causes Michael to go to Jayne and force her hand – her resignation. Michael persuades Connie to change her mind about resigning as Jayne departs for good. As Donna is leaving the hospital she meets an ambulance ferrying an injured and bloodied Maria but cannot find out what happened to her. Final Appearance of Jayne Grayson.
467	47	"Long Day's Night"	Robert Del Maestro	Sebastian Baczkiewicz	8 September 2009	5.60
Ric operates on Maria in theatre after her hit and run accident but refuses to obey Michael's instruction that he take her back into theatre when Michael discovers a possible problem on her scan preferring to wait and see another scan result. But when Ric is proven wrong he admits his mistake and they bring Maria back into theatre managing to save her life. Meanwhile, Faye and Linden discuss her wedding day phone-call and events and Linden tells her he will talk to Joseph and clear the air. But Joseph is having none of it and tells Linden to leave well enough alone. Oliver brushes Chrissie off and is extra sensitive to Daisha and ends up asking her out for a drink.
468	48	"Out of the Woods"	Robert Del Maestro	Rob Williams	15 September 2009	5.43
Maria awakens from her coma but has no sensation in her lower limbs. Penny, having begged Ric for a chance to work in ICU, tells Maria it could be spinal shock but Ric later disputes this to Maria and tells her, although very early, she could be paralysed and berates Penny for giving her false hope. Elsewhere, Oliver tries to find a way to tell Chrissie that he wants to finish the relationship because of his interest in Daisha but becomes intrigued when she suggests it. Unknown to him Chrissie is pregnant and secretly delighted. Meanwhile, Joseph becomes distracted in theatre and nearly puts his patients's life at risk. Faye eventually admitted that although she had shared a kiss with Linden, there was no affair, putting Joseph's mind at ease.
469	49	"Spin"	Mark Walker	Al Smith	22 September 2009	5.28
Michael tries to assert himself in his new role of Director of Surgery and in light of a visit from the Department of Health tries to steal Connie's thunder on her pioneering robotic surgery but fails and Connie gets a promotion to Director of Robotics. Maria struggles with getting used to being paralysed and Penny finally manages to get a day on AAU. Michael also tests Ric's patience with the moving of surgeries from Michael to him without notice. First Appearance of Mary-Claire Carter
470	50	"The Cost of Loving"	Mark Walker	Cameron McAllister	29 September 2009	5.52
Maria's scan comes back and Ric informs her that the news isn't good due to the un-stability of her vertebrae. Ric tells her that there is an operation that could give her a good chance of walking again but it could also kill her on the operating table. Maria seizes the opportunity despite pleas from her family and Donna. Faye's son Archie is rushed to AAU and after an emergency operation by Elliott and Joseph he was transferred to ICU where he remained critical. Joseph also sought out Linden to find out his side of the story and his attraction to Faye. Meanwhile, in trying to impress Jac over a patient Penny makes a bad mistake but ends up finding out from a journalist who leaked the story on Ric which she duly takes to Ric.
471	51	"The Uncertainty Principle"	Rob Evans	Claire Bennett	6 October 2009	5.64
Arrogant consultant Henry Miller operates on Maria alongside Ric and Dr. Greene and nearly messes up the entire operation when his epilepsy starts to affect the surgery. After having a dizzy spell on the ward Chrissie tells Oliver that she is pregnant. Oliver is shocked and whilst getting over the sudden news Chrissie takes a spell for the worse and starts to lose blood - enough to know she's lost her baby. Later, Oliver and Daisha meet in the bar but a careless comment about her son causes her to leave. Meanwhile, Penny impresses Connie and Elliott which doesn't Jac.
472	52	"The Spirit Dancing"	Rob Evans	Chris Murray	13 October 2009	5.73
Feeling despondent because she is unable to walk Maria sets herself a task of reconciling her fellow patient Sunita with her mother before she dies and learns from the process. Mark tries to matchmake for Chrissie but with no success. Meanwhile, new Holby CEO Vanessa Lytton calls into question Connie's Robotics launch and funding. Unknown to Connie Michael and Vanessa are close colleagues and she is keeping Michael up to date whilst he is away with Annaliese who has just given birth to their son. First Appearance of Vanessa Lytton

== Cast ==
=== Main characters ===
- James Anderson as Oliver Valentine (from episode 34)
- Rakie Ayola as Kyla Tyson (until episode 8)
- Paul Bradley as Elliot Hope
- Emma Catherwood as Penny Valentine (from episode 34)
- Tom Chambers as Sam Strachan (until episode 10)
- Hari Dhillon as Michael Spence
- Rebecca Grant as Daisha Anderson
- Tina Hobley as Chrissie Williams (episodes 1-2, from episode 19)
- Jaye Jacobs as Donna Jackson
- Patsy Kensit as Faye Byrne
- Nadine Lewington as Maddy Young (until episode 32)
- Rosie Marcel as Jac Naylor
- Amanda Mealing as Connie Beauchamp
- Duncan Pow as Linden Cullen
- Robert Powell as Mark Williams
- Hugh Quarshie as Ric Griffin
- Luke Roberts as Joseph Byrne
- Phoebe Thomas as Maria Kendall

=== Recurring characters ===
- Ayesha Antoine as Rachel Baptiste (episodes 5−29)
- Leslie Ash as Vanessa Lytton (from episode 52)
- Roger Barclay as Terence Cunningham (from episode 41)
- Benedick Blythe as John Grayson
- Dominic Colchester as Jamie Norton (until episode 6)
- Stella Gonet as Jayne Grayson (until episode 46)
- Andrew Lewis as Paul Rose
- Alex Macqueen as Keith Greene
- Niamh McGrady as Mary-Claire Carter (from episode 49)
- Alan Morrissey as Nicky van Barr (from episode 37)
- Anna-Louise Plowman as Annalese Carson (episodes 3−38)
- Riann Steele as Lauren Minster (from episode 33)

=== Guest characters ===
- Oliver Boot as Ben Woodman (episodes 20−35)
- Ade Edmondson as Abra Durant (episode 8)
- Holly Lucas as Martha Hope (episodes 20−36)
- Meera Syal as Tara Sodi (episodes 36−44)
- Peter Wingfield as Dan Clifford (episode 25)
