= Oliver Valentine =

Fictional character from Holby City

- Holby City character
- First appearance: "Proceed With Caution"; 9 June 2009
- Last appearance: Episode 1089; 14 December 2021
- Portrayed by: James Anderson

In-universe information
- Occupation: Specialist registrar, cardiothoracic surgery (prev. F1, F2, CT1 doctor)
- Family: Tony Valentine (father); Blanche Valentine (mother); Penny Valentine (sister)
- Spouse: Tara Lo (2013); Zosia March (2017–)
- Children: Arthur Valentine-Self

Oliver "Ollie" Valentine is a fictional character from the BBC medical drama Holby City, played by actor James Anderson. He first appeared in the eleventh series episode "Proceed With Caution", broadcast on 9 June 2009. Oliver was introduced alongside his older sister, Penny (Emma Catherwood), as a Foundation House Officer 1 (F1) on rotation at Holby City Hospital. Series producer Diana Kyle intended their inclusion to have an "instant impact on the wards." Anderson was selected to play Oliver; he spent time with a real F1 doctor and trained with the programme's medical advisors to prepare for the part. It took him around six months to ease into the role, and a further six to feel comfortable in it.

Oliver was initially portrayed as "the golden boy" compared to his sister. Boyishly charming and medically talented, he nonetheless lacked confidence in his ability. When Oliver reached his F2 training, the series formed an on-screen duo by pairing him with registrar Greg Douglas (Edward MacLiam). Oliver's lack of competency was highlighted – he endangered patients and landed his colleagues in trouble. In a prominent storyline, Oliver made a series of medical errors, which forced him to admit that he cheated on an exam at medical school. He began a downward spiral, and reached "rock bottom" when Penny was killed off. He was then central to a special flashback episode, which depicted his battle to cope with her death. Though he confessed to Director of Surgery Henrik Hanssen (Guy Henry) that he was not truly qualified, Hanssen allowed Oliver to continue practising medicine.

Branded a Lothario-type character, Oliver has been involved in several romantic storylines during his tenure; Anderson has called him "the hospital bike". In a toy boy storyline with ward sister Chrissie Williams (Tina Hobley), Oliver was seen to compromise his career. He went on to date ward sister Daisha Anderson (Rebecca Grant), kiss registrar Jac Naylor (Rosie Marcel), and earn the unreciprocated affection of ward sister Frieda Petrenko (Olga Fedori), and marry F1 doctor Tara Lo (Jing Lusi). Anderson decided to leave the series in 2012 and filmed his final scenes in March 2013. Oliver departed in the episode "Mens Sana In Corpore Sano", dated 9 July 2013. He returned on 23 December 2014, for one episode, before making a full-time return on 5 May 2015. Anderson opted to leave the series again in 2017 and Oliver departed in the episode "No Matter Where You Go, There You Are – Part Two", broadcast on 27 March 2018. Anderson returned for a two-month stint in 2021.

Responses to the character have generally been negative, with particular criticism for his poor treatment of Penny. Bree Treacy of RTÉ Ten disliked both Valentines. Many have questioned Oliver's medical skills and labelled him an incompetent doctor – as Daniel Maier of The Guardian put it, he is "a doctor with the blue eyes of Fonda and the medical competence of fondue".

== Storylines ==
Oliver arrives at Holby City Hospital as an F1 doctor, alongside his sister Penny (Emma Catherwood). He acquires Penny's preferred rotation on the Acute Assessment Unit (AAU), where he develops a flirtatious relationship with ward sister Chrissie Williams (Tina Hobley). Within weeks, their relationship becomes sexual. Chrissie becomes pregnant, but later miscarries. They break up, and Oliver moves on to date ward sister Daisha Anderson (Rebecca Grant). A transfer to the cardiothoracic surgery ward has him working under registrar Jac Naylor (Rosie Marcel). While Daisha spends Christmas with her family in the Philippines, Oliver kisses Jac. Upon her return, Daisha learns of the tryst. Soon thereafter, she is shot during a hostage situation and Oliver struggles to cope. Although she recovers, she opts to leave Holby and move back to the Philippines.

Oliver discovers that Penny has been having a relationship with a patient, Scott (Joshua Bowman), endangering her career. She plans to move to Spain with him and abandon her training, but Oliver convinces Scott to leave without her. Keen to earn praise from his consultants, Connie Beauchamp (Amanda Mealing) and Elliot Hope (Paul Bradley), Oliver claims Penny's research as his own, and is awarded her place in an operation. He is promoted to F2 level, and betrays Penny further by revealing her affair with Scott, which results in her failing her cardiothoracic rotation and being moved to the AAU. A rivalry develops between them, but they are forced to call a truce when a series of pranks endanger a patient.

Registrar Greg Douglas (Edward MacLiam) shirks his responsibilities by excessively delegating to Oliver; to his dismay, Connie appoints him as Oliver's mentor. Oliver pushes himself too far in an attempt to impress Greg, which earns the senior doctor a reprimand for leaving him unsupervised. Oliver tries to earn back Greg's respect, but panics while attempting to insert a chest drain, and has to be rescued by ward sister Frieda Petrenko (Olga Fedori). He invites her for a drink as thanks, but when Penny discovers that Frieda has romantic feelings for him, Oliver cancels as he does not reciprocate them. Oliver's confidence is further damaged when he mishandles a case, which results in a mother leaving her son to die alone. He moves back to the AAU, where he is shaken by an encounter with the boy's mother, which causes him to panic and embarrass himself in theatre. Penny's career begins to improve, and Oliver resents her when she is given registrar duties for a shift. Having realised that he is close to failing his F2 year, Oliver implicates Penny in a serious surgical error of his own doing, but is caught by registrar Antoine Malick (Jimmy Akingbola).

When a patient unexpectedly dies in his care, Oliver breaks down. He confesses to Penny that he cheated in medical school by swapping one of their exam papers, so he passed on her merit while she was forced to repeat a year. Furious, Penny tells Oliver that he must confess to Director of Surgery Henrik Hanssen (Guy Henry). He writes a letter of resignation, but deletes it after a positive day working alongside Frieda, who encourages him to repeat his F2 year. After giving Oliver a final chance to confess, Penny is called away to the site of a train crash. Oliver is left alone on AAU, where he successfully performs a difficult procedure. Hopeful that Penny will forgive him, Oliver is devastated to learn that she has been killed in an accident at the crash site. Unable to cope in the aftermath of her death, Oliver turns to drugs and alcohol. He sends Hanssen a letter of resignation, which includes a full confession. His father Tony (Simon Shepherd) offers him money to choose a new career, and claims that Oliver always had more potential than Penny. This angers Oliver, who endangers his own life to save a patient and feels reinvigorated. Hanssen is impressed by Oliver's patient treatment, and overlooks his cheating to allow him a fresh start.

Oliver continues and succeeds in his second F2 year under Elliot, who is his mentor. He begins a relationship with F1 Tara Lo (Jing Lusi). He learns she has a brain tumor and becomes fixated on finding a cure. She learns to accept it. Oliver begins spending more time at Tara's flat and later moves in. Oliver and Tara marry the day before she has a major operation. Oliver and Tara prepare for her operation, but there are complications in surgery and she dies.

Anderson returns as Oliver in the episode "I Will Honour Christmas in My Heart" - Series 17, Episode 11, for just one episode. He makes a full return from Series 17, Episode 30 and onwards, as the new registrar on Darwin.

In season 19 Ollie and Zosia get back together. After numerous troubles and storylines including an abortion and box of antiques. Ollie finally proposes with a haribo ring in the episode "Unbreakable." Furthermore, in the episode "Project Aurous," they make their engagement official after Ollie gives Zosia a proper engagement ring.

In "Group Animal, Part 2" Ollie, as well as others, are shot in a dramatic two-part special by Fredrik Johannson who was later shot dead by police. Ollie was shot through the head and Roxanna Macmillan operated on him. He goes up to ITU after the hospital is taken off lockdown. Ollie is placed into a coma. Zosia returns and Ollie wakes up from his coma, and is transferred to AAU, and then Keller. Roxanna becomes obsessed with Ollie and is constantly checking up on him and getting emotionally involved. When Ollie diagnoses a stroke, Roxanna is filled with joy.

== Development ==
=== Creation and characterisation ===
Careless and cocksure, Oliver Valentine has always been something of a golden boy, leaving sister Penny in his shadow. But Ollie's big, blue eyes belie darker truths that lead to his deceptive and sometimes devious nature. Yet what Ollie lacks in confidence he makes up for with his natural talent in theatre and boyish charm. But how far that will get him remains to be seen.

— BBC Online.

The impending arrival of sibling trainee doctors Oliver and Penny was announced in May 2009, by executive producer Tony McHale and series producer Diana Kyle. The latter described them both as "full of energy and enthusiasm", and asserted that they would have an "instant impact on the wards at every level." They were deemed talented physicians with the desire to achieve by McHale, who noted that "one is more naturally gifted than the other", and suggested that their personal lives would cause conflict with their professional ones, as they attempted to progress at work.

Actor James Anderson was cast as Oliver. Before assuming the role, he shadowed a real F1 doctor on ward rounds – an experience he found difficult. "We were approaching beds in which people were waking up from heart attacks and coming around quite distressed sometimes. It was really difficult to be there with a patient. It's harder than you think and I got quite emotional." Anderson underwent such extensive training with the programme's medical advisors that he jested in June 2009, "If I started medical training now, I could probably graduate as a doctor coming out of the show!" The actor experienced "an extended period of anxiety" upon joining the series, and recalls: "It took me about six months to have any sense of what was going on and then the second six months to feel comfortable [...] but only because it's such a well-oiled machine. You're coming in as a little cog, so you have to discover how to work in that and that takes a while."

BBC Online described Oliver's positive qualities as being his "boyishly charming" manner and his general determination. Jane Simon of the Daily Mirror deemed him a "soft touch" when he went to great lengths to help a young patient. Oliver is flawed by a lack of confidence and his deceptive nature. He has a tendency to land his colleagues in trouble, which has been conveyed through storylines with Daisha and Greg. What's on TV highlighted Oliver's "lack of competence" and called him petulant for betraying Penny after his promotion to F2 level. When his career began to deteriorate, the publication deemed him reckless, then found him hapless in the aftermath of her death, in reference to the way he "[sank] into despair, finding comfort in drink, drugs and his dead sister's flatmate." The Sunday Mirror's Kevin O'Sullivan reflected on Oliver's development since his arrival, with the observation, "Once he was the strutting ladies' man of the wards, a veritable medical Casanova who exuded confidence and charm. But time has taken its toll on Oliver Valentine – and now he is just a shadow of his former self" – a devastated and broken man, "tormented by the memory of his sibling and his guilty conscience."

=== Relationships ===
Introduced as a Lothario-type character, according to Anderson, Oliver "had a reputation for being the hospital bike." His first relationship developed when he attracted the attention of ward sisters Chrissie Williams and Daisha Anderson. Daisha showed less interest in him than Chrissie, of whose attentiveness Anderson said, "I think any hot-blooded male would find that attractive". Oliver appeared to ruin his chances with Daisha when he encouraged a patient to complain about her diagnosis – though Anderson noted, "he does apologise to Daisha, and sweetly gives her a cupcake". This left Chrissie free to pursue Oliver. Before their relationship began, Anderson opined "She's gorgeous, and Oliver would be a fool not to go out with her." He thought that Oliver and Chrissie's "unflappable" natures made them a good fit for one another, though wondered if they were too alike. As an older woman, their relationship was described as a "toyboy storyline" for Chrissie. Hobley admitted to having fun with the storyline due to the real age gap between herself and Anderson. She described Chrissie's feelings for Oliver, stating: "Chrissie is having a lot of fun with him. But deep down she's really hoping to find true love – she's been quite unlucky so far. She's not getting any younger and she's worried about missing out on kids." Producers Kyle and McHale revealed that the pair could have been a "perfect match", however said the romance would not run smoothly.

Anderson believed it was a bad idea for his character to get involved with a colleague. Oliver began to doubt the relationship, and on Penny's advice, convinced Chrissie to break up with him without ruining his career. Chrissie took the break up well, and Hobley told What's on TV that her character did not mind, as "it was only a bit of fun. She never planned on settling down with him." It was then announced Chrissie would become pregnant with Oliver's child. Hobley assessed that Chrissie was surprised to learn that she was pregnant, but pleased, as she had lost a baby five years previously and did not think that she was capable of conceiving another. Oliver was displeased by the news, but Chrissie had no expectations that he should provide for her. Her father, nursing consultant Mark Williams (Robert Powell), urged him to "stand up to the mark and be a proper man". However, soon after, Chrissie miscarried their unborn baby.

Oliver went on to share a kiss with Jac, a photograph of which was spread around the hospital by Penny, prompting Oliver to try and hide it from Daisha. Ward sister Frieda Petrenko developed a crush on him, and was pleased when he invited her for a drink, however Oliver did not reciprocate her feelings and later cancelled. Fedori commented in January 2011 that she and Anderson had had little "juicy" material, more "little scenes here and there". Asked about the future of Frieda and Oliver's relationship, she was unwilling to divulge potential plots, but noted, "There's been talk about things heading in all sorts of directions".

Oliver initially had a "friendly rivalry" with sister Penny. Catherwood believes they always had "a really good relationship". She characterised the siblings' relationship as "one of constant rivalry but ultimately unconditional support", and noted, "Everything always comes more easily to Oliver than Penny – she has spent her life playing catch up". When Penny considered giving her career up over a patient she was romantically involved with, in order to protect her, Oliver ruined the romance. Their relationship remained unaffected by this: Catherwood revealed, "Well they are brother and sister, so you forgive your family for enormous amounts. So it doesn't affect their relationship, if anything he is there as soon as she breaks down he's there to catch her, full of apologies and support." She said the situation would bring them closer together, because it is a typical scenario siblings go through. When Catherwood quit the series, Penny was killed whilst attempting to rescue a patient from a train crash. Her death was not shown on-screen: a conscious decision made by the production team to fully focus on Oliver's story. Series producer Myar Craig Brown revealed that the big focus would be on the effect it had on Oliver. Forced to come to terms with her death, he faced an "emotional rollercoaster of feeling that he was second best to her".

=== Career ===
Having arrived at Holby as an F1, Oliver quickly progressed onto his F2 training. This resulted in "professional jealousy" forming with Penny, and in retaliation to their disagreements, he put her career in jeopardy by revealing her affair. Registrar Greg Douglas was appointed as Oliver's mentor. The fast-paced storyline saw Greg initially "kick[ing] against his newfound responsibility", before realising that Oliver could be beneficial to his own career, which resulted in an "unlikely friendship" forming between them. Though a "fairly light, buddy-buddy" storyline to begin with, Anderson felt that filming their scenes was "intensive". Speaking of their friendship, Anderson explained: "We start off on the wrong foot with each other and we're competitive, which is unhelpful to the patients and (initially) we're not out to help one another at all. But they have similarities... in terms of dropping people in it." The pace of the storyline had to be changed when Anderson injured his knee upon falling down a ten-foot cellar. The pair clashed over conflicting medical opinions on patient care, and their friendship soon created a negative effect over Oliver's work ethic. Greg's jokes at his expense left Oliver unable to carry out simple procedures correctly.

Oliver's career further deteriorated in early 2011, when it transpired he was not a qualified doctor. A series of setbacks – failing the exam to progress on to his CT1 training, blaming a surgical error on Penny, and the death of a patient in his care – prompted him to admit that he swapped his own exam paper with Penny's in his final year of medical school. Anderson explained that Oliver could no longer cope with the mounting pressure, hence his confession. Contrasting the siblings, he assessed "[Oliver] was seen as the golden boy when he arrived at Holby – but he was trading on his sister's success." Issued with the ultimatum of confessing to Director of Surgery Henrik Hanssen, Oliver realised that "he must take responsibility", lest he "lose the one person who loves him unconditionally."

Believing himself to be in an "impossible dilemma", Anderson said that Oliver was trying to make good on what he had done by repeating his F2 exams. "By exposing the lie he'll end his career, Oliver can't understand why Penny won't stand by him." He added that since Oliver made a serious surgical error, his colleagues had lost trust in his medical capability. When a train crash occurred, he was forced to take control of AAU. Anderson explained: "He's not fully qualified and that's all he can think about. He's struggling." When he saved a patient's life, Oliver thought he should keep his job. However, he was then told that Penny had died, news that would "change Oliver's life forever." Following Penny's death, Craig-Brown stated that "whether he's good enough to stay in medicine will be [Oliver's] big storyline." The series explored how Oliver coped with her death through a flashback episode. Henry, who plays Hanssen, observed that Oliver's return to work saw him make multiple mistakes and "hit rock bottom". Oliver tried to resign from Holby, though before he left he responded to a dangerous RTA call and saved a patient's life. When he was summoned by Hanssen about his resignation, he was given "fatherly advice", and the senior doctor "turned a blind eye" to Oliver's confession. Henry explained that Hanssen "doesn't think a good doctor should lose his chance at a career in medicine", after learning Oliver risked his own life on the job.

=== Departure and return ===
The character left the show in the episode titled "Mens Sana In Corpore Sano", which aired on 9 July 2013. Anderson told producers of his intention to leave one year prior to his departure. They wanted Oliver to leave the show on a positive note and began planning his final storyline. Anderson filmed his final scenes in March 2013. Producers kept his departure a secret until transmission to surprise viewers. Anderson told Daniel Kilkelly from Digital Spy that Oliver survived the bereavement over the deaths of his sister and wife. Oliver was given redemption in his final scenes so that his fans could believe that he has a future. Oliver resigns and in his final scene tells Elliot that he will return to the hospital. Anderson was pleased that his character has the option of returning in the future.

On 30 October 2014, it was announced that Anderson had reprised his role. Anderson expressed his pleasure at returning to Holby City saying he was "thrilled to be given the opportunity to bring Ollie back". He said there would be "lots of surprises in store" for his character, who he dubbed "Oliver 2.0" due to him being older and wiser. Anderson had been approached to return numerous times but only agreed mid 2014. Oliver's return was planned to last one episode but Anderson was persuaded to return permanently. The BBC later released a promotional video publicising the character's return. Oliver's return storyline will see him admitted to the hospital suffering from a serious heart condition. Anderson explained that in the fourteen months since his departure from Holby, Oliver has been working abroad in South America, drinking heavily and self-medicating with several drugs. As he was not taking proper care of himself, he contracted a virus which has affected his heart. Ric Griffin (Hugh Quarshie) discovers a "bloodied and badly bruised" Oliver near the hospital entrance, and admits him immediately. When it emerges that Oliver's condition is potentially fatal, he asks Elliot to fit him with his new surgical device. However, Jac refuses to let the surgery go ahead as the device is only in the experimental stage. Anderson said "Oliver knows that the operation shouldn't go ahead. It's legally, ethically and morally not a procedure that he should have, but when Jac says no, he's disappointed and angry." However, Elliot refuses to give up on Oliver and makes sure the operation goes ahead.

=== Second departure and return ===
Anderson decided to leave the series again in 2017 and Oliver departed in the twentieth series episode "No Matter Where You Go, There You Are – Part Two", broadcast on 27 March 2018. Oliver's exit was not announced before transmission and Anderson confirmed the news on Twitter, commenting, "It's with a full, heavy heart that I now move on to adventures new."

On 5 October 2021, it was announced that Anderson had reprised the role once again. The character returns in episode 1080, originally broadcast on 12 October 2021. His return story features Oliver returning to the hospital seeking a mentorship with Henrik. Henrik meets with Russ Faber (Simon Slater) and reluctantly agrees to take on one of his mentees. Henrik is shocked to discover that it is Oliver but agrees to help. Oliver wants to retrain as a surgeon following his brain injury. Henrik begins to worry that Oliver is not ready to return as he lets his emotions compromise his work. Anderson's return is only temporary and his departure coincides with the show's final festive episodes. He departs in episode 1089, originally broadcast on 14 December 2021. His exit story features Oliver deciding not to return to medicine and to join Zosia and his son, Arthur, in America.

== Reception ==
"Ollie is meant to be the naturally talented one out of him and sister Penny, but you wouldn't trust him to take a splinter from your finger without accidentally grafting your spleen to the back of your neck. Having ballsed up one operation and blamed it on his sister, this month Oliver has admitted to failing his original medical exams and swapping his papers with Penny's – meaning Dr Dumbo has been practising illegally all along. Keen to avoid any further sibling betrayal, Penny chose the easy way out and got herself crushed to death by a falling train carriage."

— Daniel Maier of The Guardian, on Oliver's lack of skill and betrayal of Penny.

Reviewers' interpretations of Oliver have generally been negative. Early in his tenure, he received positive commentary from Inside Soap, who said, "he may be a whizz-kid trainee doctor, but new Holby recruit Oliver Valentine isn't all work and no play! He's certainly got an eye for the ladies." Maeve Quigley, writing for the Daily Mirror, opined that Chrissie was more than a match for Oliver. She added that he soon learnt "you underestimate the female staff of Holby at your peril", after he thought his flirting had Chrissie "wrapped around his little finger."

Also writing for the Daily Mirror, Simon called Oliver and Penny a "medical tag-team". She found it odd they did not get along professionally because she thought "a brother-sister relationship would be one of the least troublesome at Holby." A Liverpool Daily Post review said that Oliver made Penny feel about "two inches tall" when he was promoted to F2, and supported her question "Who needs enemies when I've got a brother like you?" Bree Treacy of RTÉ Ten found both of the Valentines annoying. In June 2010 she preferred Penny, "with Oliver definitely getting the award for the most annoying sibling in the hospital"; the following month she called them irritating and recommended they "get [their] acts together". On the day Oliver admitted to stealing Penny's exam paper, Daily Mirror critic Jim Shelley featured him in his negative "Down" column and branded him a "weasel".

Oliver's lack of medical ability drew several negative reviews. Referring to his "cack-handedness", Simon described him as "screwing up just about everything he touches" upon his return to the AAU, a sentiment she repeated after Penny's death. Simon was left baffled when a professor of cardiology was offered the "very best care possible" – which resulted in Oliver treating him. She concluded by asking: "What's he doing at Holby being looked after by an F2?" The Guardian's Daniel Maier ridiculed Oliver's supposed talents, and jested that he was "a doctor with the blue eyes of Fonda and the medical competence of fondue". One Daily Record columnist said that Oliver "hoped to complete his training on the strength of his nice eyes and pretty".

A special flashback episode, centered on Oliver dealing with the aftermath of Penny's death, was selected as recommended viewing by What's on TV, the Liverpool Daily Post, and the Daily Mirror. The Sunday Mirror's O'Sullivan called it poignant, and Rachel Mainwaring of the Western Mail wrote, "It's easy viewing (apart from the odd gooey scene) and full of moral as well as medical issues that leaves you shouting at the screen, 'Do the right thing Oliver, tell them the truth.'"
