= Penny Valentine (Holby City) =

Fictional character from Holby City

- Holby City character
- Emma Catherwood as Penny Valentine in 2009
- First appearance: 11x34, "Proceed With Caution", 9 June 2009
- Last appearance: 13x26, "Boy Valentine, Girl Valentine", 12 April 2011
- Portrayed by: Emma Catherwood

In-universe information
- Occupation: Foundation House Officer 2
- Family: Oliver Valentine (brother)
- Significant other: Scott James

Persephone "Penny" Valentine is a fictional character from the BBC medical drama television series Holby City, portrayed by actress Emma Catherwood. She appeared from 2009 to 2011, in the programme's eleventh to thirteenth series. Penny was introduced alongside her younger brother, Oliver (James Anderson), as a Foundation House Officer 1 (F1) on surgical rotation at Holby City Hospital. She eventually progressed to F2 level, before being killed off in the aftermath of a train crash; her death occurring off-screen.

== Development ==
=== Creation ===
Penny and her brother Oliver were created as F1 doctors, arriving in Holby City during its eleventh series. Executive producer Tony McHale and series producer Diana Kyle announced their arrival in May 2009, with Kyle describing them both as "full of energy and enthusiasm", assessing that they would have an "instant impact on the wards at every level." McHale described them as "a great addition to the gang", explaining that: "They both want to achieve and although one is more naturally gifted than the other, they're both very talented doctors. Work and private lives are bound to collide in their quests to climb their respective career ladders." Actress Emma Catherwood was cast in the role of Penny. She observed several bypass operations as preparation for the role, which she described as a "wonderful experience" which she felt privileged to attend, and also learned how to insert a cannula and central line. Catherwood dyed her hair red for the role, believing that the colour suits Penny's "feisty and ambitious" personality.

=== Personality and relationships ===
The BBC Holby City website describes Penny as "outgoing, playful and stylish", assessing that "she always seems positive", is "determined to learn everything about everything" and that "nothing stands in her way". Catherwood has similarly described Penny as "eager to please [and] ambitious", unwilling to let anything get in the way of her career advancement. She has deemed Penny's relationship with Oliver "one of constant rivalry but ultimately unconditional support", explaining that: "Everything always comes more easily to Oliver than Penny - she has spent her life playing catch up". From her first day at Holby General, Penny is bullied by registrar Jac Naylor (Rosie Marcel). Catherwood described the clash between the characters as one between "two very strong-willed women", explaining of her character's motivation: ""Although [Penny] doesn't like Jac so much, she has to impress Jac in order to get to where she wants to be."

Catherwood was initially told little about her character's background. She was made aware that Penny is "closed down" to men and relationships, in contrast to Oliver who has frequent affairs, but only had "an inkling" of why that was the case. During the show's twelfth series, Penny falls in love with heart transplant patient Scott James (Joshua Bowman), with Catherwood assessing that Scott "forces her to open her heart". Forced to decide between Scott and her career, Penny chooses love, which Catherwood described as "a huge thing to do". Although Scott ultimately breaks up with Penny on Oliver's advice, Catherwood felt that the development actually made the siblings' relationship stronger, explaining: "You forgive your family for an enormous amount. He's there as soon as she breaks down, he's there to catch her, full of apologies and support. It's just another thing that brothers and sisters go through and support each other through."

Catherwood felt that the storyline would make Penny more driven with regards to her work, assessing that she had formerly been mistaken in being so confident and ambitious. She believed that Penny had been "shaken" by her rejection, which would lead to her becoming more vulnerable both personally and professionally. The actress hoped that Penny would improve at her job in the future, though commented that none of the remaining Holby City characters were a suitable match for her romantically.

== Storylines ==
Penny arrives at Holby General as a Foundation House Officer 1, alongside her brother Oliver. Registrar Jac Naylor takes an instant dislike to her, and ignores her request to work on the hospital's Acute Assessment Unit, placing her instead on the general surgery ward, Keller. After making a good impression on cardiothoracic consultant Connie Beauchamp (Amanda Mealing), Penny is transferred to the cardiothoracic surgery ward, Darwin, where she is mentored by consultant surgeon Elliot Hope (Paul Bradley). Penny develops feelings for Scott James, a patient awaiting a heart transplant, and the two begin a relationship. During an unrelated case, Penny convinces a reluctant husband to donate his deceased wife's organs, unaware that Scott will be the recipient of her heart. When Elliot discovers their relationship and the link between cases, he holds Penny back a surgical rotation and forbids her to see Scott again. Scott announces his intention to move to Spain, and asks Penny to leave with him. Disillusioned with medicine, Penny agrees; however, Oliver convinces Scott that Penny will come to regret abandoning her career, and Scott rescinds his offer, leaving alone.

When Oliver makes a surgical mistake, he attempts to persuade Penny to take the blame for him. He alters the affected patient's records to substitute his name for Penny's, but is caught by registrar Antoine Malick (Jimmy Akingbola). Penny is furious - more so when Oliver confesses that he failed his final medical exam and switched his paper with hers. She takes annual leave, and tells Oliver to admit that he is not a qualified doctor to director of surgery Henrik Hanssen (Guy Henry), or she will. Upon returning from leave, Penny is called to the scene of a major train accident. She attempts to save a passenger from beneath a carriage, but it collapses on top of her, killing her instantly. After identifying Penny's body, Oliver confesses his cheating to Malick. Malick stops him from telling Hanssen, stating that Oliver is a good doctor and that he will overlook his confession.
