= Jayne Grayson =

Fictional executive officer in BBC TV medical drama Holby City

- Holby City character
- Stella Gonet as Jayne Grayson in 2008
- First appearance: 9x39, "Under the Radar", 10 July 2007
- Last appearance: 11x46, "Faithful", 1 September 2009
- Created by: Tony McHale
- Portrayed by: Stella Gonet
- Spinoff(s): Casualty, 2008

In-universe information
- Occupation: Chief executive officer (July 2007 to September 2009)
- Spouse: John Grayson
- Children: Christian Grayson; Two others, unnamed
- Nationality: Scottish

Jayne Grayson is a fictional character in the BBC medical drama Holby City, portrayed by actress Stella Gonet. The character first appeared on-screen on 10 July 2007 in episode "Under the Radar" – series 9, episode 39 of the programme. Her role in the show was that of chief executive officer of the Holby City Hospital Primary Care Trust, making her the only regular character who is not a medic by profession. Gonet formerly appeared as a doctor in Holby City's sister show Casualty, and has since appeared in crossover episodes of the drama, this time as Jayne Grayson. Her storylines in Holby City have revolved around issues of hospital bureaucracy, as well as her husband's affair with her colleague Connie Beauchamp. A two-part episode which saw Jayne fight the hospital's board of directors and the British government over the separation surgery of the conjoined twin daughters of illegal Korean immigrants proved a critical success, and was positively received by many tabloid TV critics.

== Creation ==
Throughout Holby City's eighth and ninth series, the role of chief executive officer of the Holby City Hospital Primary Care Trust was filled by recurring character Christopher Sutherland (Patrick Toomey. One series 9 plot strand saw Sutherland refuse to hire Agency nursing staff for budgetary reasons, causing senior nursing staff Mark and Chrissie Williams (Robert Powell and Tina Hobley) to instigate union action, leading the hospital's nursing staff in a work to rule day. As a result of this action, Consultant Cardiothoracic surgeon Elliot Hope called the hospital's board of directors to take a vote of no confidence in Sutherland, leading to his dismissal from the hospital. The vacant CEO position was filled two episodes later with the arrival of Jayne.

It was first announced on 15 June 2007 that Stella Gonet had been cast in the role of Jayne. Gonet said of joining the cast of Holby City: "I am absolutely delighted to be hiring and firing at Holby. I am loving working with the cast – they are so warm and welcoming and committed." She had made a previous appearance in the first series of sister show Casualty, playing a Dr Clare Wainright, which she compared to her new role, saying:

"It was 21 years ago and all I remember was a lot of people telling us what to do and where to put things because of all the medical jargon. I was only in it for two episodes and that's all it was ever going to be. I was off to join the Royal Shakespeare Company for the first time and Casualty didn't seem that interested in asking me to stay and do any more.
I suppose the big difference is that I'm not playing a doctor but playing management, which is a huge thing in hospitals now. The writers work really hard to make the show viable, as well as upping the drama, which is what people want to watch. That hasn't changed."

Gonet is an established actress in British television, known for her role in the 1990s BBC series The House of Eliott. Her casting as Jayne follows a trend of Holby City producers towards hiring established British actors – with Gonet joining a series 9 cast alongside former film actress Patsy Kensit as Ward Sister Faye Morton, comedian Adrian Edmondson as Consultant Surgeon Abra Durant and Jesus of Nazareth star Robert Powell as Nursing Consultant Mark Williams. Series creator Mal Young commented on the preference for established names when discussing Holby City's inception, explaining: "Soap actors are the best actors. There’s been so much snobbery before. The whole thing about typecasting was probably invented by actors who couldn’t get other work. From day one I knew I wanted to put on screen people that viewers want to watch. There’s no downside to that." Series producer Diana Kyle also addressed this trend in November 2007, when asked: "When you cast an actor, do you actively seek out well-known names – like Jane Asher (Lady Byrne) and Patsy Kensit (Faye) – or will a role simply go to whoever's better suited?". She responded to this question: "It's lovely when we have a new member of the cast come in and bring an audience with them. But we want the best actors, and the star names we cast are always the best - which is why we go for them!"

== Development ==
Upon announcing the addition to the cast of the new character Jayne, the BBC described her as "a witty and ambitious go-getter who strives relentlessly to achieve her aims", but who "thinks of herself as Solomon." In a detailed character summary, it was stated:

"In spite of her lack of experience within the NHS, Jayne has belief she can turn around the fortunes of the hospital. She is a force to be reckoned with, doesn't suffer fools lightly and has the confidence to face all the problems thrown at her whether a top consultant, student nurses or aggrieved patient relative, and does it with a good sense of humour.
She is compassionate when necessary, able to deal fairly with people, she is reasonable and will listen to everyone. Jayne is diplomatic, a good manager and relies on her own judgement and making her own decisions."

It was revealed in episode "The Q Word" that prior to arriving at Holby, Jayne worked as a management consultant, and that when asked for help by her own father with his struggling business, she dismissed him from his position and took control of the company herself in a hostile takeover. Jayne is married with three children. During the show's tenth series, her husband John (Benedick Blythe) began an affair with Jayne's colleague Connie Beauchamp (Amanda Mealing). Their teenage son Christian was treated at the hospital after being rescued from drowning, bringing the affair to an end.

== Storylines ==
Series 9

Jayne takes over from Christopher Sutherland as the new chief executive officer of Holby City Hospital's primary care trust in episode "Under the Radar". She immediately makes a poor impression on several staff members by upholding Thandie Abebe's racial discrimination complaint against Elliot Hope, and making plain to Connie Beauchamp that she intends to bring about change within the hospital, welcome or not. In episode "The Q Word", she spends the day on the hospital's Acute Assessment Unit, shadowing Abra Durant. She halts his plans to perform charity operations at night, and later discovers that Maddy Young has taken Elliot's place on the racial awareness course she enrolled him on. She suspends both characters from work pending a tribunal in episode "Temporary Insanity", and goes on to further her growing unpopularity amongst the staff by again turning down Abra and Ric Griffin's renewed proposals for charity operations at night, explaining there will be no room in her budget for at least a year.

Casualty appearances and Series 10 Jayne appears in a cross-over with sister show Casualty in episode "Thicker Than Water", when long-serving character Harry Harper decides to quit. She appears again in episode "Diamond Dogs", appointing Harry's replacement. She goes on to become emotionally involved in the case of the conjoined Tan twins, whose parents are illegal Korean immigrants. She is unable to convince the Board to fund the twins' separation surgery, and accepts a donation from Reverend Steve Randall, an American evangelist. However, it emerges in the national press that Randall is suspected of child abuse, and the Board demand Jayne's resignation for damaging the hospital's reputation. Jayne and surgeon Linden Cullen, who is also involved in the Tans case, are able to manipulate the media, and as the twins' surgery draws to a close, secure alternate funding from the British government. At her meeting with the Board, three Directors resign, but Jayne succeeds in maintaining her position as CEO.

While the conjoined twins controversy is ongoing, Jayne's husband John begins an affair with her colleague, Connie Beauchamp. Jayne is unaware of the affair.

Series 11

Connie remains ignorant of John's true identity until Christian Grayson, Jayne and John's teenage son, is admitted to hospital having drowned. Connie and Linden are able to save Christian, and Connie ends her affair with John, not wanting to be responsible for breaking up his family. Jayne took some time off in episode 25, to care for her mother. She returned in episode 35, to reveal her mother had died. She decided to readvertise the Director of Surgery job, after taking a vote of no confidence in Ric Griffin. She has since revealed that she wants Connie to take the job. She told Connie in episode 37, that she suspects her husband John of having an affair. Jayne then found out about Connie and John's affair and a month after decides to ask the board to give the Director of Surgery job to Michael and then she hands her resignation in and leaves Holby City in September.

== Reception ==
The two-part episode which saw Jayne face the hospital's Board of Directors, as well as the national media over the separation surgery of the conjoined Tan twins proved popular with critics, and was selected as a televisual 'Pick of the Day' by The Western Mail, Daily Record, the Huddersfield Daily Examiner, the Sunday Mercury, the Daily Mirror, and the Liverpool Echo.
