= Greg Douglas (Holby City) =

- Holby City character
- Edward MacLiam as Greg Douglas
- First appearance: "Together Alone"; 17 February 2010
- Last appearance: "Coercion"; 1 May 2012
- Portrayed by: Edward MacLiam

In-universe information
- Occupation: Cardiothoracic surgical registrar

Greg Douglas is a fictional character from the BBC medical drama Holby City, played by actor Edward MacLiam. He first appeared in the series ten episode "Together Alone", broadcast on 17 February 2010. Greg was introduced as a new Cardiothoracic surgical registrar working at the hospital's Darwin ward. Producers created an affiliation with long-standing character Connie Beauchamp (Amanda Mealing) and played a short romance. Greg is characterised as an ambitious, abrasive, rebellious medical professional. He has "Irish charm" and will often use it to his advantage. Greg's fictional backstory detailed him growing up in Dublin, Ireland. MacLiam has said producers wanted a "North Side Dubliner" with a more aggressive persona than other characters to feature in the series. One of the character's initial stories featured him mentoring F2 junior doctor Oliver Valentine (James Anderson). The show developed a "bromance" between the two and they were depicted either arguing or joking their way through scenes.

The character's main storyline was centric to fellow Cardiothoracic surgeon Sahira Shah (Laila Rouass). Series producer Myar Craig-Brown placed the pair at the forefront of the show during series thirteen. As they featured so predominately, Craig-Brown achieved her aim in exploring a complex love story. She had been loath to portray a generic soap opera affair story. Sahira's husband and Consultant Anaesthetist, Rafi Raza (Zubin Varla), was introduced and which resulted in the exposing of Greg and Sahira's romance. It culminated in Sahira's departure from the show following Rouass' decision to leave. MacLiam's departure from Holby City followed soon after and on-screen Greg was fired from the hospital for hesitating to resuscitate a patient. The character last appeared in the episode titled "Coercion", which was broadcast on 1 May 2012. The character was generally well received by television critics, with his charming persona being particularly favourable.

== Casting ==
MacLiam admired the quality of acting and hard work put into making the show. He also liked the attention to detail during fast-paced filming. He found the role a challenge, especially learning the medical terminology the role required.

== Development ==
=== Characterisation and introduction ===
Greg is full of Irish charm, and he knows it. He's worked hard to get where he is and believes the world is against him. He naturally rebels against authority but with his cheeky-chappy attitude he normally gets away with it.

— BBC Online.

Greg is originally from Dublin, Ireland and has much "Irish charm" written included in his characterisation. In the character's fictional biography published via BBC Online, Greg is described as being "charming, clever, rebellious". He is flawed as a person due to his "iconoclastic and cynical" personality. He also bears grudges and does not take any criticism. He is rebellious and "thrill-seeking" and wants to delay growing up, instead he opts to enjoy life to the fullest. He holds "a strong moral compass and sense of justice" and supports the "underdog". Other characters are easily charmed by Greg yet prior to his arrival at Holby City hospital no woman had managed to tame him.

MacLiam described his character as "quite a charming, abrasive kind of guy, he's very ambitious, he's really looking to get ahead as quick as he can." He said producers wanted Greg to be a "North Side Dubliner", a more aggressive type of character who would not have a "snug fit" in the show. He likened the character to an "iron first in a velvet glove". They also informed MacLiam that he would be played as a "ladies man". The actor wanted to take that characterisation and ensure Greg could "get away" with being a ladies man, who rises to challenges and show off a little, while still doing excellent medical work.

When Greg is introduced on-screen he shares a brief romantic bond with Consultant Cardiothoracic surgeon Connie Beauchamp (Amanda Mealing). They had worked alongside each other at the fictional Trafalgar private hospital. MacLiam explained that Greg had been there to assist Connie in her work and their romance developed from this. He added they shared good chemistry in scenes.

=== Friendship with Oliver Valentine ===
Writers created an on-screen partnership between Greg and F2 junior doctor Oliver Valentine (James Anderson). On-screen Connie appoints Greg as Oliver's new mentor while he trains on the foundation programme. MacLiam told a Daily Post reporter that "it's a good story and a lot happens very quickly, Greg kicks against his newfound responsibility initially." But the registrar soon realises that Oliver could benefit his career and an "unlikely friendship forms". Anderson branded it "a fairly light story" and a "buddy-buddy [relationship] thing in the making." The characters start off on bad terms and they become overly competitive. It is not helpful for patients and Anderson noted the characters have no interest in helping each other. But then they realise that they are quite similar "in terms of dropping people in it"; they form a friendship which the show invested more in.

The pair continued to share screen time as they shared cases on the ward. Anderson reinforced the notion that they were "unlikely" friends but always moan at each other. MacLiam believed they had formed a "bromance". The wardrobe department dressed the pair in similar checked shirts to convey their similar characteristics. MacLiam joked that it was paying homage to the film gay themed movie Brokeback Mountain. They sometimes mimic the behaviour of a married couple despite Greg and Oliver only sharing a platonic friendship. Writers placed the pair in yet more conflict when Oliver's actions get Greg into trouble with Connie. The story featured Greg leaving Oliver unsupervised and a patient dying in his care. Rather than conceal the exact circumstances, upon being confronted by Connie, Oliver blames Greg's absence. An angry Greg decides that he must take revenge against Oliver. He sets Oliver up on a date with Harriet Crowley (Karen Hayley), but he is shocked to learn that Harriet is a prostitute. She demands that she be paid for her services and Oliver realises that he has been set up. He then has to earn Greg's friendship back and he forgives him.

=== Relationship with Sahira Shah ===
In November 2010, it was announced that producers had cast actress Laila Rouass to play Cardiothoracic surgical registrar Sahira Shah. They also revealed that character would be married and they planned to develop a romantic connection between her and Greg. Rouass told Katy Moon from Inside Soap that her character sets out to prove herself to her new colleagues. She noted that Greg would become suspicious of her, but he is impressed with her surgical skills. The pair develop a friendship following a problematic time on Darwin ward. Greg is the perpetrator of many problems which cause the cancellation of operations. Sahira books Greg to assist her with pioneering surgery which will put Holby City hospital in good stead in the medical community. He arrives to work following a night of heavy alcohol consumption. He suffers a hangover and is given two formal warnings, leaving Sahira disgusted with his bad attitude. He then causes more trouble and the operation has to be cancelled. Writers switched Sahira from an enemy to ally for Greg; she decides to defend Greg which enables him to keep his job. Hospital CEO Henrik Hanssen (Guy Henry) becomes jealous of Greg and Sahira's rapport.

In June 2011, Series producer Myar Craig-Brown stated that a central focus of series thirteen had been developing a love triangle story between Greg, Sahira and Hanssen. Craig-Brown described an "amazing relationship" dynamic between Greg and Sahira. She said that it was a complex storyline and not a simple one. She had been loath to portray it as a "conventional soap or serial drama story about a woman who has an affair." She wanted to explore the difficulties people face when they fall in love with someone outside their marriage.

Producers lined up an issue led story for the character. They introduced a patient named Andy Bryan (Glen Wallace), who is revealed to be Greg's old childhood friend. Producers hinted that the character was hiding a secret, having Andy refer to Greg by the name of Callum. MacLiam explained that Greg has tried to disassociate himself from his past. He is then dishonest with Sahira and states that Andy once beat him up. She soon learns that it was Greg who hurt Andy. He also causes more problems by refusing to treat Andy, wanting to forget his past. It was then revealed that Andy was abused by his football coach. He tries to commit suicide by jumping off the hospital roof and Greg is forced to face Andy and convince him to back down. In a storyline twist that writers had kept secret prior to the episode being broadcast, Greg reveals that he was also a victim of the abuse. MacLiam branded it a "gritty storyline" to portray. He added that it would test the relationships he shared with other characters as he tries to move on with his life. Sahira also offers her support to Greg during his ordeal. Craig-Brown used the storyline to ultimately bring Greg and Sahira closer together.

Greg's involvement with Sahira continued to be explored on-screen. Their first kiss results in a period of estrangement as they both feel it wrong to begin an affair. Greg is tasked with saving the life of a patient in need of a difficult heart-valve replacement. He then has to ask for Sahira to assist him in theatre as it is not a procedure he can undertake alone. Writers played them working well together and their working relationship was allowed to resume. Holby City writers continued to develop their relationship during January 2012, producing a significant change in their dynamic. When Sahira is called away from the hospital and a fatal car accident is reported, Greg fears that Sahira is dead. An Inside Soap reporter described Greg being in a state of despair worrying she is dead. But his "despair turns to relief" when he manages to locate Sahira. Greg reacts by kissing Sahira but she shocks him by announcing her intention to leave the hospital. Of the on/off relationship MacLiam explained "I think Sahira's in denial and she has to suppress what she feels about him. She's just trying to block those feelings out."

Sahira tries to avoid Greg again but another complex heart operation forces them to work together. Another reporter from the magazine wrote about "electric chemistry" between the two. They added that work wise Sahira is a "steely" character, but in her personal life is unable to resist Greg's charms. The pair are forced to attend an upmarket dinner event in a bid to secure much needed hospital funding. The episode included obvious signs that an affair between the two characters had become inevitable. Writers would not let their affair go unchallenged and introduced Zubin Varla to play Consultant Anaesthetist Rafi Raza. Greg is surprised when he introduces himself as Sahira's husband, Greg reacts by cancelling his theatre slots scheduled with Sahira to avoid her. This makes Rafi notice that something is amiss between his wife and colleague. MacLiam told Patrick McLennan from What's on TV that "while Greg tries to maintain a professional distance from Sahira, he still can't deny how he feels."

Hanssen's jealousy resurfaces and he warns Rafi about Greg. Sahira is then threatened by a gun wielding patient and Greg saves her. Rafi witnesses an intimate moment between the two following their ordeal. He reacts badly and punches Greg. Off-screen MacLiam injured himself and had to have knee surgery. This was written into Greg's story and writers explained the character on crutches via Greg injuring himself following a fall. The injury meant that Holby City had to hire a stunt double for MacLiam to film the fight scenes. The actor explained that his character is "tactile" when in Sahira's presence. But their "little looks" and hand touching had all been monitored by a suspicious Rafi. Rafi decides to resign following their altercation and issues Sahira an ultimatum that she must either chose to save her marriage or career. She decides to put her family first and hands in her resignation. Rouass herself had decided to leave the show which lead to the character's departure.

=== Departure ===
Jane Simon of the Daily Mirror wrote that the character would leave the series "under a massive cloud" after he gets too involved with a patient which proves to be an "occupational hazard". The character departed the show during the episode titled "Coercion" broadcast on 1 May 2012. His final scenes show Greg being fired from the hospital by Hanssen following Greg hesitating to revive a patient because of personal issues.

== Reception ==
"He's smooth, handsome and charming. Oh yes, when it comes to the ladies, Greg Douglas seems to have it all - and then some. He's never been exactly what you would describe as the 'settling down type' - he believes life's for having fun. However, Greg does have a gentler side, and it's that which comes to the fore this week when he thinks Sahira has been involved in a traffic accident. In the past, he may have kept women at arm's length, but times are a-changing."

— A critic from the Daily Record, on Greg's personality and love life.

A Daily Mirror writer said that Greg was a "happy-go-lucky" character with a "gregarious demeanour". Another branded him "Holby's Irish charmer". On Greg and Sahira they said "the sexual tension between Sahira and Greg finally bubbles over when they head off to a medical conference together. We diagnose trouble ahead." The news outlet's Jane Simon was not impressed with Greg's exit. She scathed "some staff members at Holby get massive exit storylines. Others, like Greg Douglas the other week, are out of the door before you even realise they're going."

Dick Vinegar writing for The Guardian moaned about the lack of realism in Holby City. He thought it was implausible Sahira could access medical records detailing a fight Greg had been involved when he was young. They added that had occurred in a different country which made it more unlikely. David Hennessy of The Irish World profiled Greg stating "career-minded, self-assured and with a way with the ladies, Greg was the Holby staff member you would want looking after you if you landed in one of their wards, and want to go for a pint with once discharged." The critic believed Greg had good chemistry with Sahira as soon as they appeared on-screen together. They added "their storyline kept audiences guessing over whether they might end up together and allowed both characters to go out with a bang." A reporter from the Daily Post said "if only real doctors looked as dashing" as Greg and Oliver.
