= Elliot Hope =

- Holby City character
- First appearance: "More Equal Than Others"; 8 November 2005
- Last appearance: "Episode 1102"; 29 March 2022
- Created by: Richard Stokes
- Portrayed by: Paul Bradley
- Spinoff(s): Casualty, 2010, 2012, 2014

In-universe information
- Occupation: Consultant cardiothoracic surgeon; Clinical lead; Professor of medicine; TB researcher
- Spouse: Gina Hope (until 2006)
- Significant others: Anne-Marie, Lady Byrne; Tara Sodi; Brigitte Nye
- Children: James Hope; Martha Woodman

Elliot Hope is a fictional character from the BBC medical drama television series Holby City, played by Paul Bradley. The character first appeared on 8 November 2005 in the series eight episode "More Equal Than Others". He made his departure during the seventeenth series episode "At First I Was Afraid" broadcast 22 September 2015. Bradley reprised the role in 2019, to celebrate the show's twentieth anniversary, and again in 2022 for the show's final episodes. Elliot was introduced as a consultant surgeon and clinical lead on Holby city's cardiothoracic surgery ward. His storylines have seen his wife Gina, a motor neuron disease–sufferer, die by assisted suicide, and his relationship with his children subsequently deteriorate. Elliot considered suicide himself, before reconciling with his family. He ended a brief romance with colleague Lady Byrne as he was still mourning Gina, and later shared a kiss with his old friend Tara Sodi.

Bradley was cast in the role after originally auditioning for a more minor part, and impressing executive producer Richard Stokes. He observed real heart surgery being performed in preparation for the role, and bases his portrayal of Elliot on his own father, who was a doctor. Elliot is portrayed as "a disorganised genius" and "a medical Columbo". He was the focus of Holby City's 2007 Christmas episode, based on the 1946 film It's a Wonderful Life. The assisted suicide storyline proved controversial, though the Elliot-centric Christmas episode was generally well received by critics. The Times's David Chater called it "highly effective in what it sets out to do", though Robert Hanks of The Independent deemed it "incompetent to the point of sacrilege".

== Creation ==
Elliot was introduced to Holby City in November 2005 as the new Clinical Lead of the hospital's cardiothoracic surgery ward. Paul Bradley was cast in the role, having auditioned for a smaller part and impressed executive producer Richard Stokes, who asked him to audition for a longer-term character. Bradley met with the show's producers, who offered him the role of Elliot on the spot. His casting was announced in June 2005, when series producer Emma Turner commented: "The man is a great surgeon but his shambolic appearance and eccentric manner will cause the highly-political Connie's feathers to become ruffled. Elliott is a devoted family man who absorbs the pain he sees around him – but there will always be a price to pay."

As research for the role, Bradley observed three operations at the University College London Heart Hospital, an experience he described as "amazing" and a privilege to attend. Bradley's father was a doctor in Nuneaton, and he attempts to emulate him onscreen through his portrayal of Elliot. Bradley has described his first few weeks on Holby City as amongst the hardest acting experiences he has ever had, due to the medical terminology, props and procedures associated with the role.

Jim Shelly of The Mirror commented unfavourably on the "horrible inevitability" of Bradley's casting, as he had previously portrayed Nigel Bates in the BBC soap opera EastEnders. Shelley noted a trend for former EastEnders and Channel 4 soap Brookside actors being cast in Holby City. The show was filmed at the BBC Elstree Centre, where EastEnders is also filmed. Bradley commented that it was "strange" making the same journey to a different show, and has noted differences between Elliot and his EastEnders character Nigel in that Elliot has a "better wardrobe" and is more intelligent. He also commented that working on Holby City was "harder" than EastEnders, as the show was filmed with a single-camera set-up which takes longer, and there were "more things to go wrong" when working with medical props and simulating operations.

== Development ==
Elliot is described on the BBC Online Holby City homepage as "a disorganised genius" who "comes across as a bumbling eccentric" but has surgical expertise which is "second to none". Bradley has deemed Elliot "a medical Columbo", who is "shambling, untidy but good with patients and a genius medically", as well as "a brilliant surgeon who does everything in an off-the-wall way." He has been described as "genial" by The Mirror's Shelley, while fellow Mirror critic Jane Simon has deemed him "shambling" and "not the most convincing medic we've ever seen". Comparing Elliot to fellow cardiothoracic consultant Connie Beauchamp (Amanda Mealing), Bradley explained: "Connie is text book brilliant, whereas Elliot is more inspired. He may seem eccentric but he really listens to his patients - he's very straight forward and not at all stuck up. They are chalk and cheese. Connie's side of the office is very neat and tidy. But Elliot's is a total mess. She's quite uptight, and anybody as relaxed as Elliot really gets on her nerves." On 17 November 2006, Bradley appeared as Elliot in a Children in Need segment featuring the Holby City cast performing a version of "Hung Up" by Madonna.

Elliot's wife Gina suffers from motor neuron disease. An October 2006 storyline saw her travel to a clinic in Switzerland, where euthanasia is legal. Gillian Bevan, who plays Gina, explained: "Gina can't bear to be a burden to her husband any longer. She is adamant that Elliot wouldn't understand her decision." Although Elliot comes to understand Gina's decision, and is by her side as she dies, his relationship with his children becomes strained as a result. Sam Stockman, who plays Elliot's son James, explained in October 2007: "[James] still blames Elliot for helping his Mum die and then just posting her suicide note to him, which was the first he heard about her death".

The Holby City 2007 Christmas episode, "Elliot's Wonderful Life", was a reimagining of the 1964 film It's a Wonderful Life featuring Elliot, and guest-starring Richard Briers as his guardian angel. It was filmed in North London over three weeks. Series producer Diana Kyle described the episode as Elliot "go[ing] on a major emotional journey and tak[ing] time to reassess his life". Bradley explained: "Elliot goes into this complete breakdown and decides to kill himself", and discussed Elliot's motivation in considering suicide: "Something in his brain snaps. He's overworked and emotionally overwrought." He explained that, while the episode is based on It's a Wonderful Life: "the screen doesn't go wobbly so you know you're in fantasy world. It's played very straight. There are some really interesting things going on - angels in the corridors and nobody knows who this old man is. But it's not all doom and gloom, there's humour in there and it's a bit of an adventure." Bradley was pleased to work with Briers, commenting: "Richard has always been a hero of mine. He's an actor I've always wanted to be like. We got on so well; we were exhausted from laughing!" Briers added of the storyline: "It's extraordinary to pinch a marvellous idea from a great film."

On 22 September 2015, during the seventeenth series, Elliot departed the show after ten years. His exit was kept a secret to surprise viewers. Elliot was seen leaving Holby to be with his love interest Brigitte Nye (Sally Dexter). The show's executive producer Oliver Kent hoped Bradley would return in the future, saying the door would be open for him. Kent added "We all adore Elliot Hope and we will miss him like crazy. Paul has been a fabulous member of the Holby City family for 10 years, and we thank him from the bottom of our hearts for all his incredible work."

In 2019, Bradley agreed to reprise the role of Elliot to celebrate the show's twentieth anniversary. Elliot will appear for a five-episode run in which he will get reacquainted with Jac. In addition it soon becomes clear he has an ulterior motive for returning. Of his return Bradley stated that "I'm really looking forward to returning to a programme on which I spent so many happy year."

Holby City was cancelled in June 2021 after 23 years on air. Producers invited multiple former cast members to reprise their roles during the show's final series. Bradley reprised his role as Elliot in episode 1100, first broadcast on 15 March 2022. His appearance in the episode had been kept under embargo until transmission and he will continue to appear until the show's final episode. Elliot returns when Adrian "Fletch" Fletcher (Alex Walkinshaw) calls him to help Jac, who is terminally ill and needs an operation to save her life. He eventually agrees to operate on Jac.

== Storylines ==
Elliot arrives at Holby city episode "More Equal Than Others", when it is revealed he has beaten cardiothoracic consultant Connie Beauchamp to the position of Clinical Lead. He later steps down from this position in order to spend more time with his wife, Gina (Gillian Bevan), who has motor neuron disease and goes on to end her life by euthanasia, with Elliot by her side. Elliot's relationship with his children, James (Sam Stockman) and Martha (Holly Lucas), is strained following their mother's suicide. James goes missing, causing Elliot to worry his son has also died by suicide, before returning from Bangkok with a heroin addiction. He becomes involved in gang violence and is shot. Although he recovers, Martha is resentful when Elliot refuses to attend his trial, where James is given a 12-month suspended sentence. When Martha is shot with a crossbow, Elliot considers suicide, but ultimately decides against it and his family reconciles. Elliot has a brief romance with Lady Byrne (Jane Asher), the mother of his registrar Joseph (Luke Roberts), however he ends the relationship as he is still mourning Gina.

Martha leaves Holby to attend university, returning two years later having married in Las Vegas without telling her father. Elliot is upset, so Martha plans a picnic at which Elliot can get to know her new husband Ben (Oliver Boot) better. At the picnic, Elliot's dog Samson is run over by an ambulance, resulting in a pneumothorax. Elliot operates on Samson in a basement theatre, and he makes a full recovery. When Ben confides in Elliot that he is experiencing on-going health problems, he initially agrees not to tell Martha, not wanting her to worry. Martha later learns Ben is in the early stages of Sarcoidosis and will be blind within months. Relating his own experience of Gina's failing health, Elliot advises Martha to leave Ben, and ultimately they break up.

When Martha arranges a surprise party for Elliot's 50th birthday, he is re-introduced to an old friend from university, Tara Sodi (Meera Syal). He and Tara formerly performed pioneering heart surgery together, but their patient died. Tara attempts to convince Elliot to try their technique again. Elliot initially refuses, but later changes his mind. The operation is successful, and Tara is offered a full-time contract at Holby General. When Tara revives a patient with a DNR order against his wishes, tension arises between her and Elliot over the issue of euthanasia, with Tara unaware of the circumstances of Gina's death. Despite this, Elliot convinces her to sign her contract, and the two share a kiss.

In later years, Elliot mentors both Penny (Emma Catherwood) and her brother Oliver Valentine (James Anderson). He becomes very friendly with Penny, and is devastated when she is killed trying to save a patient's life. He tries to help Oliver overcome his grief. Elliot's job is threatened when Henrik Hanssen (Guy Henry) attempts to merge Darwin Ward with the heart surgery ward at St. James' hospital, but he puts an end to the plans and Elliot keeps his job. He becomes determined to see the scientific project he has worked off for many years, the Hertzig (an electronic heart), into practise, and is delighted when he finds a potential patient. However, the patient withdraws their consent at the last minute, and Elliot risks his career by putting it in anyway. There are complications and the patient later dies.

Elliot trains a new F1, Tara Lo (Jing Lusi), when she comes to Darwin, and becomes close with her. A second potential Hertzig patient arrives on Darwin, and he and Tara successfully use the Hertzig on her; however, a number of months later, she returns to the ward with problems and soon dies. Tara is devastated, and she reveals to Elliot that she has a brain tumour and the Hertzig trial made that very real. Elliot keeps the information from Tara's boyfriend, Oliver. When he finds out, he lashes out at Elliot for not telling him. Tara's tumour starts evolving again, and Elliot brings in a brain surgeon to operate on her. Tara dies from complications during surgery. Elliot becomes worried for Oliver, who married Tara the night before her death, and tries to help him. Oliver later leaves Holby City on good terms with Elliot.

Elliot starts a relationship with Oliver's psychiatrist, Sharon Kozinsky (Madeleine Potter), and they become serious until Sharon gets a job offer in America. Although he originally plans to take a sabbatical and visit America with her, Elliot decides it is a step too far and says goodbye to her.

After Jonny and Mo clash, their friendship becomes strained. Jonny and Mo's issues impacted on their professional lives when Jonny disobeyed Mo orders that a transplant patient must stay in bed. Jonny allowed the patient to go to the chapel and she collapsed, leading Elliot to realise that there was trouble between Jonny and Mo. Elliot then threatened to remove them from the transplant team. The pair soon made amends pleasing Elliot whose team on Darwin ward was once again solid.

Jac returns from her time away from the hospital in 2014 prematurely after learning of Elliot's worsening health to help with the Herzig 5 (artificial heart) project which leads to her having to take the lead halfway through the crucial operation being used to market the device. Guy Self then attempts to tempt Jac into taking Elliot's place; leading the Herzig 5 project and running Darwin ward. During episode 42 of series 16 ("One Small Step"), Jac is reunited with Connie by Guy for an endarterectomy procedure, pushing Jac into accepting Guy's offer of taking over Elliot's work. Elliot is delighted to be reunited with Connie but furious when he discovers Jac's betrayal.

After Elliot has fully recovered from his ill health and recent surgery, Oliver Valentine returns to the hospital fourteen months after leaving for South America. As Oliver was not taking proper care of himself, he contracted a virus which has affected his heart. Ric Griffin (Hugh Quarshie) discovers a "bloodied and badly bruised" Oliver near the hospital entrance, and admits him immediately. When it emerges that Oliver's condition is potentially fatal, he asks Elliot to fit him with his new surgical device. However, Jac refuses to let the surgery go ahead as the device is only in the experimental stage. When Jac says no, Olivers disappointed and angry. However, Elliot refuses to give up on Oliver and makes sure the operation goes ahead.

Guy Self started to focus more onto the surgery side of things in April 2015, once he got told that he can not carry on performing in theatre and still be the chief executive officer of Holby City Hospital. Guy was unhappy about this but he chose Neurosurgery over being the CEO, he apologised to Elliot about demoting him from being the Clinical Lead of Darwin and later reinstated him before he stepped down as the CEO.

When Brigitte Nye comes back to Holby with Frieda Petrenko (Olga Fedori) who is seriously ill, he performs major surgery on her to prevent her dying. Midway through, Elliot runs into some problems and he realises that neither he or Oliver can do it. Jac arrives just in time and saves Frieda. Elliot reconsiders his future at Holby while he is talking to Jac about Brigitte. Jac points out that Elliot seems to be in love and Elliot decides to leave Holby to be with Brigitte.

== Reception ==
Bradley was named 20th "Best Actor" in the 2006 BBC Drama Awards for his role as Elliot. He was longlisted for the 2007 National Television Awards, but was not shortlisted. The storyline which saw Elliot's wife Gina commit assisted suicide was the subject of a Daily Telegraph debate. Rachel Pickering, a GP and hospice doctor from Greenwich, opined that the storyline was to be "condemned". She criticised Gina's dying words: "I want to be allowed to die with dignity", suggesting that The Voluntary Euthanasia Society has "hijacked" the word "dignity" in changing its name to Dignity in Dying. Pickering wrote that, in her own experience, the majority of MND patients die peaceful natural deaths. She was opposed by two correspondents, Lena Pycroft of London and Ray Knight of Thaxted. Pycroft congratulated the BBC for "[bringing] into sharp relief the appalling dilemma facing terminally ill patients", while Knight commended: "The most telling point in the Holby City episode was that, having made the decision, the patient was happier and more relaxed - a fact repeatedly confirmed in real life. Is it not time our legislation reflected that?"

The Times's David Chater commented positively on the episode "Elliot's Wonderful Life", writing that: "Holby City fans will love this episode [...] It is highly effective in what it sets out to do, although – like so much television at Christmas – you need to drink a pint of warm Baileys for the full effect." The episode was selected as recommended viewing by several TV critics, including Dydd Iau of the Liverpool Daily Post, and Roz Laws of the Sunday Mercury, who noted: "It sounds a bit strange, but there's snow, carols and an uplifting happy ending for a change." The Mirror's Maeve Quigley called it "a timeless story", though questioned the plausibility of a world in which Elliot's patients went untreated, as "the NHS isn't a one-man band after all". In contrast, Robert Hanks of The Independent reviewed the episode negatively, calling it "incompetent to the point of sacrilege". Hanks wrote: "What it did add to the mix, that James Stewart never achieved, was to give the viewer an authentic frisson of empathy: there was a point towards the end – during an encounter with Elliot's miraculously resurrected, motor-neurone-disease-afflicted yet remarkably soignée and articulate wife - when I began to see never having been born as preferable, sometimes, to prime-time TV."
