= Greg Douglas =

Greg Douglas may refer to:

- Greg Douglas (Holby City), a character in the British TV series Holby City
- Greg Douglas (sailor), Canadian sailor

== See also ==
- Greg Douglass, American rock guitarist
