= Christiana Thorpe =

former Chief Electoral Commissioner of the Sierra Leone Electoral Commission
- Preceded by: James Jonah

Personal details
- Born: 16 August 1949 (age 77) Freetown, Sierra Leone
- Education: University College Dublin, Dublin, Ireland

Dr. Christiana Ayoka Mary Thorpe (born 16 August 1949) is a former two-term Chief Electoral Commissioner and Chairperson of the National Electoral Commission (NEC) of Sierra Leone. She is the first woman to serve as Chief Electoral Commissioner in the country's history. She was also a Deputy Minister of Education in the 1990s. In March 2016, she was appointed a Deputy Minister of Education, Science and Technology, though one source states that Parliamentary approval was still pending.

== Early life ==
Chriatiana Thorpe was born and raised in Freetown, Sierra Leone, in one of the country's poorest communities. In 1952, Thorpe and her younger sister went to live with their grandmother in the poor neighbourhood of Kroo Bay. Her grandmother, who was a washerwoman and herbalist, had a significant influence on her. Thorpe and her sister were the only girls in the neighbourhood who went to school, and she enjoyed teaching other girls what she learned, discovering that she loved teaching.

After completing secondary school, Christiana Thorpe left for Ireland to join the order of St. Joseph of Cluny, a convent in Ferbane, Ireland and became a nun. She attended University College, Dublin and graduated with a joint degree in French and English in 1976, followed by a master's and a Ph.D. in the British West Indies.

== Career in education and government ==
After 20 years as a nun, Christiana Thorpe left convent life to devote herself to the protection and education of girls and returned to Sierra Leone. She became a teacher and later the principal of St. Joseph's Secondary School for girls in Makeni, a village north of the capital city of Freetown.

In 1993, Christiana Thorpe became the only woman in a 19-member cabinet under the military-led government under Captain Valentine Strasser, serving as Deputy Minister of Education and later Minister of Education. She formed and chaired the Sierra Leone branch of the Forum for African Women Educationalists (FAWE-SL) in 1995, focused on ensuring girls' access to quality education, especially those affected by the war in Sierra Leone. FAWE-SL established schools, offered trauma counselling for war-affected girls, and promoted women's conflict resolution skills.

Thorpe was appointed as the Chief Electoral Commissioner and Chairperson of the National Electoral Commission (NEC) by⁣⁣ Ahmad Tejan Kabbah, President of Sierra Leone, in 2005. She served as Chief Electoral Commissioner for two consecutive five-year terms. Although some people questioned her second term, she remained impartial and upheld high standards. Thorpe improved elections by introducing a biometric system, training staff, and updating voter lists to prevent cheating and increase trust.

After the end of her second term, in 2016, she was appointed one of two Deputy Ministers of Education, Science and Technology in a cabinet reshuffle, though one source states that parliamentary approval was still pending as of April.

== Honours ==
Christiana Thorpe received the 2006 Voices of Courage Award from the Women's Commission for Refugee Women and Children ⁣⁣ for her work with displaced children and advocacy during Sierra Leone's civil war. In 2009, she was honoured with the German Award for her pivotal role in ensuring free, fair, and peaceful elections during Sierra Leone's democratization process. The award highlighted her professionalism, integrity, and perseverance, particularly for the 2007 and 2008 national elections. She was also honoured with the Defenders' Day Award by the United Nations for her commitment to upholding fundamental freedoms and protecting basic rights amid Sierra Leone’s conflict and post-war era.

She was bestowed with the International Golden Award in 2013 by the President of Liberia, Ellen Johnson Sirleaf, for her distinguished service in supporting democracy and peacebuilding in the region. On November 3, 2014, Thorpe was conferred with the Joe C. Baxter Award by the International Foundation for Electoral Systems (IFES) acknowledging her leadership and integrity in overseeing credible and transparent elections. She received a Special Token of Appreciation For Remarkable Services Award of Sierra Leone for her many years of service to humanity, especially for girls’ education and empowerment.

As President, ECONEC (Network of Electoral Commissions in West Africa), she was elected to lead this regional organization, reflecting her continental influence on electoral integrity.
