= Lady Byrne =

Fictional character in BBC TV medical drama Holby City

Anne-Marie, Lady Byrne
- Holby City character
- First appearance: "After the Fall"; 10 May 2007
- Last appearance: "Snow Queens"; 28 December 2010
- Portrayed by: Jane Asher

In-universe information
- Occupation: Executive chairman of the Byrne Foundation
- Spouse: Charles, Lord Byrne (until 2007)
- Children: Joseph Byrne; Harry Byrne; Sophia Byrne

Anne-Marie, Lady Byrne is a fictional character from the BBC medical drama Holby City, portrayed by actress Jane Asher. The character first appeared in the ninth series episode "After the Fall", broadcast on 10 May 2007. After several guest appearances as the mother of established character Joseph Byrne throughout series 9 and series 10, Asher signed a three-month contract to become a series regular from May 2008 onwards, for a period of ten episodes. Her initial storyline saw her son's girlfriend, Jac Naylor (Rosie Marcel), embark on an affair with Anne-Marie's husband and Joseph's father, Lord Byrne – eventually culminating in his death, and leaving the character a widow. Upon her return to the programme, she takes over Lord Byrne's position as Executive Chairman of the Byrne Foundation – a charity committed to research into Cardiac Valve Disease.

== Creation ==
Series 8 of Holby City saw the introduction of regular character Joseph Byrne (Luke Roberts), a new Surgical Registrar on the hospital's Cardiothoracic ward, Darwin. Joseph arrived in episode "Mother Love", alongside his father, recurring character Charles, Lord Byrne (Ronald Pickup). One series 9 plot strand saw Joseph begin to date fellow Surgical Registrar Jac Naylor, unaware that she was only interested in him for his father's influence. Jac begins an affair with Lord Byrne in episode "Paranoid Android", despite Lord Byrne's thirty year marriage to his referenced, but as yet unseen wife, Anne-Marie.

Jane Asher was initially cast for a run of five episodes in the role of Anne-Marie, reportedly with the option of returning for more later in the series. Coincidentally, Asher had played Luke Roberts' mother once before, in the 2001 revival of ITV soap Crossroads. Asher has commented on the co-incidence: "It's the second time I've played Luke Roberts' [Joseph] mother - the first was when we were in Crossroads together [as Angel and Ryan Samson]. We get along really well and are very fond of each other." Series producer Diana Kyle was asked in November 2007: "When you cast an actor, do you actively seek out well-known names – like Jane Asher [Lady Byrne] and Patsy Kensit [Faye] – or will a role simply go to whoever's better suited?", to which she responded: "It's lovely when we have a new member of the cast come in and bring an audience with them. But we want the best actors, and the star names we cast are always the best – which is why we go for them!"

== Development ==
=== Lineage and personality ===
Anne-Marie is first introduced in episode "After the Fall", as the wife of thirty years of recurring character Lord Byrne, and the mother of regular character Joseph Byrne. At the time, the Byrne family also included Joseph's comatose brother Harry, introduced in episode "Promises to Keep", and two other, unnamed brothers. Although Harry was reintroduced in the show's tenth series, neither of Anne-Marie's other two sons have been mentioned since, despite the death of both their father and brother. Asher has described Anne Marie as "a strong character".

=== Divorce and widowhood ===
Anne-Marie is initially highly supportive of Joseph's relationship with Jac Naylor, unaware that the younger woman is having an affair with Lord Byrne. Asher said of the storyline at the time: "Her husband may have strayed before, but never like this. When she finds out the truth, it's going to be pretty earth shattering for her. When she realises what her husband's been up to there'll be quite a showdown!" Indeed, Anne-Marie discovers Charles' infidelity several weeks later, in episode "Close Relations", and immediately terminates their marriage and removes Charles from the family home. Although they swiftly begin divorce proceedings, Anne-Marie attends to Charles' bedside after he suffers a stroke in episode "The Q Word", and agrees to take him back, before he dies from a fatal heart attack in episode "Temporary Insanity".

Jac later worries when she discovers Anne-Marie is on the interview panel for a Consultant's post she is applying for, but her fears are proved needless when Lady Byrne supports her application regardless of their shared history. In episode "My Aim is True", it is revealed that Anne-Marie works for the Byrne Foundation, a charity founded by her husband for the purpose of research into Cardiac Valve Disease. During the course of this episode, she confides her worries about Joseph to his boss, Elliot Hope (Paul Bradley), who she later likens to a father figure to Joseph, and invites to a hospital Mexican themed evening, establishing the beginnings of potential romance. Asher has commented on their fledgling romance: "Viewers may have noticed that there's a little twinkle between Lady Byrne and Elliot. They're both lonely, good-hearted people who have been through tough times. We'll have to see that emerges - but there's potential..."

=== Death of Harry ===
Anne-Marie's younger son Harry is admitted to Holby City Hospital in episode "Physician, Heal Thyself", having deteriorated in his comatose state. As Anne-Marie is attending a conference on coma patients in Paris at the time, Joseph cares for Harry in her absence, admitting that he believes himself to be at blame for his brother's condition. Of the plot, Luke Roberts explained: "The brothers both went to medical school. Harry was naturally gifted but drank it all away. And when it came down to taking his exams he couldn't face the pressure and took an overdose. Harry called Joseph, but his brother didn't answer the phone." By the time Anne-Marie returns from Paris, Harry has deteriorated further, and is in cardiac arrest when she arrives at his bedside. After caring for him through his eight-year coma, she and Joseph finally agree to let Harry die.

=== Chairmanship of the Byrne Foundation ===
In episode 28 of the show's tenth series, the character returns to Holby City Hospital, and is disappointed to discover her late husband's charity is in decline. Asher has commented on the storyline: "She's horrified when a young man with Asperger's syndrome can't have a routine operation because they don't have the necessary equipment. Lady Byrne then discovers that the boss of Charles' charity has been investing cash instead of putting it to good use." The hospital's Chief Executive Officer, Jayne Grayson, convinces her to take over as Executive Chairman of the charity. Asher said "Jayne sees that she has the strength to run the show," She also explained "Lady Byrne is reluctant at first, but realises that she can do some good and keep the family name going – and she does a rather excellent job of it." Asher was able to contribute to the storyline in the planning stages, due to her real-world experience with Asperger syndrome. She stated "As president of The National Autistic Society, Asperger's is something I've worked with for 25 years. When Holby approached the society about this plot concerning the boy with Asperger's syndrome, they said, 'Do you realise the woman involved in this storyline is our president?'. So I was able to help out."

In episode 37 of the same series, Lady Byrne held an event to celebrate the anniversary of a piece of ground breaking heart surgery, of which her deceased husband aided in. The occasion had a 60's theme and Lady Byrne's current boyfriend, Elliot Hope, gave a talk on the surgery. Throughout the day, Elliot was constantly reminded of his late wife, Gina, and the event culminated in Elliot leaving Lady Byrne on a dance floor when she was accidentally referred to by Gina's name. The two discussed the direction of their relationship and decided to split. In the next episode it was revealed that Lady Byrne had stepped down as Chairwoman of the Byrne Foundation and had left to go on a world cruise.

Lady Byrne returned for the wedding of her son Joseph to Faye Morton. She told Elliot that she would being staying in Britain.
