= Forum for African Women Educationalists =

Pan-African non-governmental organization

The Forum for African Women Educationalists (FAWE) is a pan-African non-governmental organization founded in 1992 by five women ministers of education to promote girls’ and women's education in sub-Saharan Africa by making sure they have access to schools and are able to complete their studies and fulfill their potential, in line with UNESCO's Education For All movement. The organisation's members include ministers of education, university vice-chancellors, education policy-makers, researchers, gender specialists and human rights activists.

It has its secretariat in Nairobi. Currently it has 34 national chapters in 33 countries, including Benin, Gabon, Gambia, Ghana, Guinea, Liberia, Nigeria, Rwanda, Senegal, Sierra Leone, Tanzania, Uganda and Togo among others.

It is an International Partner Office for the Ford Foundation International Fellowships Program, and a partner organization of the Association of African Women for Research and Development.

British Gambian Oley Dibba-Wadda became the CEO of FAWE in 2014.

Key individual members include:

- Penina Mlama - Executive Director
- Esi Sutherland-Addy - Executive Board member
- Charles Ndungu - Former Research Assistant
- Graça Machel - Former Board member
- Aïcha Bah Diallo - Founding President

== See also ==
- Femmes Africa Solidarité
- Christiana Thorpe - founder of Sierra Leone branch
- N‘Dri Thérèse Assié-Lumumba
- Fay Chung - cofounder
- Nasima Badsha - a founder member of the South African branch of the Forum for African Women Educationalists.
- Gladys Kalema-Zikusoka
- Judith Ngalande Lungu
