= Judith Ngalande Lungu =

Zambian livestock production specialist

- Citizenship: Zambia
- Education: University of Manitoba (PhD)
- Occupation: Animal Scientist
- Years active: 1986 – present

Dr. Judith Ngalande Lungu is a Livestock Production Specialist and seasoned academician with over 30 years of experience in the field, having held various academic positions in various capacities at University of Zambia (UNZA), Mulungushi University, Kwame Nkurumah University and Botswana College of Agriculture.

== Education ==
She was admitted to the University of Zambia (UNZA), graduating with a Bachelor of Science in Agricultural Sciences. She obtained a Master of Science degree at the University of Massachusetts and completed her Doctoral degree at the University of Manitoba. Her thesis was on "The effect of time of feeding on time of parturition and on steroid profiles during the last month of pregnancy in the ewe."

== Career ==
She served as a senior lecturer at UNZA for 25 years from 1986 to 2011. She was the Head of the Animal Science Department and also served as the Dean of the School of Agricultural Sciences. Between 1989 and 1990, she was as a visiting lecturer in Livestock Production at the Botswana College of Agriculture. She went on to be the Deputy Vice Chancellor for Mulungushi University from 2012.

== Professional organization affiliations ==
She has held several positions that include; mentor at the African Women in Agricultural Research and Development (AWARD), member of the Forum for African Women Educationalists (FAWE) and board member of the National Institute for Scientific and Industrial Research (NISIR) and Women for Change.
