= Kroo Bay =

Kroo Bay is an informal housing settlement located on the coastline in central Freetown, the capital of Sierra Leone. In 2009, it had an estimated population of 10,989 people. Residents of Kroo Bay lack adequate access to sanitation and health services. Health care workers in Kroo Bay report a high incidence of child malnutrition, which is caused by poverty and accentuated by rising global food prices.
