= Emma Catherwood =

Welsh actress and former model

- Born: 7 December 1981 (age 44)
- Occupation: Actress
- Years active: 1999–present

Emma Catherwood (born 7 December 1978) is a Welsh actress and former model best known for her role as Jo in My Kingdom and for playing Penny Valentine in Holby City. She studied the Meisner technique in London, and has degrees in English literature and Art History.

== Career ==
Emma Catherwood began her career with Models 1, where she modelled for short time before quitting after a family crisis. Soon after, she made her first major television appearance in Little Bird for ITV, playing a downtrodden Mancunian mother of five. At the same time, she made her feature film debut in Large for FilmFour.

This led to a role starring opposite Richard Harris in My Kingdom. Harris has been quoted as saying "Emma is one of the best actresses I've worked with in my very long career". My Kingdom is based upon Shakespeare's play King Lear. It was one of the last projects made by Harris. Catherwood played Joe his daughter (Cordellia), an ex-heroin addict. In preparation for this role the young actress spent time in Liverpool, where she worked on the accent and visited recovery centres.

Emma appeared as a young prostitute, Sandra, in the ITV series The Vice. She starred opposite Ken Stott and James Frain. For the thriller Spirit Trap Catherwood lost weight and cut a severe fringe to portray the drug abusing, narcissistic character of Adele. She starred in another thriller as Mel in The Reeds, which is part of the After Dark Horrorfest.

Later, Emma played Dr Penny Valentine in the BBC medical drama series Holby City. A well-educated junior doctor, Penny Valentine arrived in Holby with her brother during the show's eleventh series. Executive producer Tony McHale and series producer Diana Kyle announced the arrival in May 2009, with Kyle describing Penny as "full of energy and enthusiasm", assessing she would have an "instant impact on the wards at every level". McHale described them as "a great addition to the gang", explaining that "They both want to achieve and although one is more naturally gifted than the other, they're both very talented doctors. Work and private lives are bound to collide in their quests to climb their respective career ladders."

Catherwood observed several bypass operations to prepare for the role.

== Filmography ==
- Grace Unplugged (2013) as Kendra Burroughs
- The Reeds (2009), Mel
- Holby City (2009–2011), Penny Valentine
- Against the Dark (2009), Amelia
- Dummy (2009), Zoe
- Senseless (2008), Nim
- In the Spider's Web (2007), Gina
- Vincent (2005), Nicola Walsh
- Spirit Trap (2005), Adele
- Born and Bred (2003), Mary Percival
- The Vice (2000 & 2002), Becky & Sandra
- A Fairy Story (2002)
- Large (2001), Rachel 'Measley' Beasley
- My Kingdom (2001), Jo
- The Love Doctor (2001), Toyah
- Little Bird (2000), Sandra
- Undertaker's Paradise (2000)
- Butterfly Collectors (1999), Julie
