= Connie Beauchamp =

Fictional character from the BBC medical dramas Casualty and Holby City

- Holby City and Casualty character
- Amanda Mealing as Connie Beauchamp
- First appearance: "In at the Deep End"; 1 June 2004 (Holby City) "Casualty@Holby City – Part One" 26 December 2004 (Casualty)
- Last appearance: Episode 1194; 3 April 2021
- Portrayed by: Amanda Mealing
- Duration: 2004–2010, 2014–2021
- Spinoff(s): Casualty@Holby City

In-universe information
- Occupation: Clinical lead, Consultant in emergency medicine.: Previously: Consultant in cardiothoracic surgery, medical director, director of surgery, deputy clinical lead.
- Family: William Chase (father); Lionel Jackson (great-uncle)
- Spouse: Michael Beauchamp (divorced)
- Children: Grace Beauchamp

Connie Beauchamp is a fictional character from the BBC medical dramas Holby City and Casualty, portrayed by actress Amanda Mealing. She first appeared in the series six, episode 35, "In at the Deep End", broadcast on 1 June 2004, and appeared in Holby City's sister show Casualty multiple times, having already appeared in crossover Casualty@Holby City episodes. Mealing continued her role as Connie until the thirteenth series of Holby City, departing in the 28 December 2010 episode "Snow Queens". Connie's role in Holby City was that of Clinical Lead of Cardiothoracic Surgery in Darwin, and Joint Director of Surgery.

It was announced on 23 July 2013 that Mealing would be reprising her role as Connie, but in Casualty. Connie Beauchamp was introduced as a consultant in emergency medicine and Deputy Clinical Lead, in March 2014, over three years since her last appearance in Holby City. Later, in June 2014, Connie's role within Casualty became Clinical Lead. It was announced in early 2019 that Mealing had decided to take a break from the show for her health reasons with Connie departing on screen later on in the year. Connie departed in the last episode of series 33 broadcast on 10 August 2019. She returned on 4 January 2020. Mealing's exit from Casualty was announced on 1 March 2021. She departed in the episode broadcast on 3 April 2021.

== Development ==
=== Relationships ===
In the character's introductory episode, she ends her first day at Holby City Hospital by having sex with new colleague Ric Griffin. Mealing explained: "Ric comes along and thinks, 'Hello she's a bit tasty!' – and when he realises she's also a phenomenal surgeon he's rather smitten with her. They spend the day flirting with each other and then, at the end of the day, she and Griffin get it on in his office - even though she's married! Connie then literally leaves him in his underpants saying, 'Oh by the way, I'm your boss, so don't be late tomorrow!' That's the sort of woman she is!" Connie goes on to begin a flirtation with her Registrar, Will Curtis, although their initial professional relationship is a strained one, with Mealing offering the insight: "being a military boy, he finds it difficult to take orders from a woman so they have a complete headlock." The two characters later share a kiss, although this is the extent of their romantic involvement. Mealing describes the event as follows: "Connie insists that Will goes along to Ric Griffin's 50th and when he arrives, he finds Connie, usually suited and stern, completely transformed. She pulls out all the stops to seduce him - and he finally gives in. [After they kiss] Connie walks off saying "I just needed to know I could have you". She does it to remind him who's in charge. In someway she does like him but she has to say no for now". Mealing's relationship with co-star Noah Huntley was markedly different off-screen, with the actress explaining: "Sometimes it's hard and I have to apologise for relentlessly going on at him. But at the end of the day we'll go to the bar and it's just us again. We get on really well, which makes the on-screen relationship work".

Connie's relationship with her husband Michael was explored in 2005, when Anthony Calf was cast as her on-screen husband. Although he was introduced as becoming Chairman of the hospital's Board of Directors in order to secure Connie's job, he later turned on his wife after the pair failed to cover-up a patient's death from MRSA within the hospital. Mealing explains: "To her horror, Michael tells the hospital board that it was Connie's decision to fake the death certificate and he insists that she step down as medical director! Connie has always known that the Trust is extremely important to him, but she believed him when he said her job would be safe". During the same episode, Connie walked in on Michael kissing Matron Chrissie Williams. Mealing continues: "As usual Michael tries to get out of the situation by using his remarkable charm. She thought he'd done his worst, but this really is the ultimate betrayal. [...] Connie won't give up without a fight". It was later revealed that Michael had committed fraud, and exposed the hospital to VRSA. Mealing explains of the development: "Connie is horrified when one of their patient dies. And Michael has hidden the results. So despite still loving Michael, she decides the only way to stop him is to set him up. Connie lays a trap by telling Michael she's spoken to the person who's heading the investigation into the first case and that he's willing to be bribed. She then lets Michael unwittingly spill the beans. It breaks Connie's heart. She's watching both Michael's career and their marriage being destroyed".

Connie later had an affair with John Grayson (Benedick Blythe), husband of hospital CEO Jayne Grayson (Stella Gonet). She ended their relationship when she discovered he was Jayne's husband, which Mealing has deemed "the ultimate sacrifice", explaining Connie's motivations as being unwilling to hurt Jayne. She has assessed that: "Connie truly loved John and she thought he loved her, too." When Connie discovers John has moved on and has another lover, "it breaks her heart. She realises what they had wasn't love... It was sex."

=== Crossovers ===
Connie has appeared in several crossover episodes with Holby City's sister show Casualty. The first full length crossover episode between the two, styled Casualty@Holby City was broadcast as a 2004 Christmas special, and saw Connie perform a heart transplant with only emergency power and a rudimentary theatre team, trapped inside a burning building after a lorry crashed into the hospital and caused an explosion, which starts a fire. Mealing has commented on the crossover: "I think it was a fantastic idea to show the two dramas in one hospital - as it is supposed to be. Connie and Harry are the bosses of their individual dramas so to see how they work together is great. And yes, it is going to be very dramatic - fantastic Christmas viewing".

=== Casualty ===
Mealing was announced to be reprising her role in July 2013, but would appear in Holby City's sister show, Casualty. Connie would return, having retrained as a consultant in emergency medicine, billed as "demanding but fair". Mealing said she was "surprised" when she was asked to reprise her role in Casualty. She said she was hoping that Connie's return would be "as exciting for fans as it is for [her]." She added that she couldn't "wait to get those heels back on and get to work". The show's executive producer Oliver Kent described Connie, following her return, as "a brilliant top-dog" and "demanding but fair". He said he felt "very lucky" when Mealing accepted the chance to return. Kent teased that Connie's arrival would "set the cat among the pigeons", especially with the emergency department's feisty clinical lead Zoe Hanna (Sunetra Sarker) and consultant Martin "Ash" Ashford (Patrick Robinson). He added that Connie would "instantly upstage" Zoe and Ash. Kent said that Connie and Zoe would develop a "fun rivalry" and that Connie's arrival would "put Ash in a very different place". Connie returned to the show on 30 March 2014, in the series 28 episode, "Valves to Vagrants".

Mealing appears as Connie in a crossover two-part episode between Casualty and Holby City, originally broadcast in March 2019.

== Storylines ==
=== Holby City ===
Connie arrives at Holby City in episode "In at the Deep End". On her first day, she seduces colleague Ric Griffin (Hugh Quarshie), before revealing that she is his new boss. She clashes with registrar Will Curtis (Noah Huntley), and actively belittles and berates him, taking particular offense at the discovery he is a Lord. This soon develops into tormenting him on a more personal level, for instance ordering him to go for a drink with her instead of disciplining him professionally in the episode "Letting Go". The tension between the pair grows, culminating in the episode "Thicker Than Water" when Connie kisses him at Ric's 50th birthday party, before informing him she just needed to know she could have him, and walking away.

Connie makes an enemy of colleague Zubin Khan (Art Malik), who is unimpressed with her leadership skills, and causes unrest by bedding colleague Mubbs Hussein, despite the fact he is at the time attempting to conceive a child with fellow staff member Rosie Sattar (Kim Vithana). She also finds herself the subject of a lesbian crush, having caught the attention of the midwife she is mentoring, Mickie Hendrie (Kelly Adams). In episode "A Shock To The Heart", Connie battles to save Will's life after he is impaled on scaffolding. As Will recovers in the intensive-care unit, Connie confesses to Zubin that she has only ever been hard on him in order to encourage him to be the best he can be. Despite Connie's efforts, Will dies, and Connie breaks down in tears as she informs his widow.

Following Will's death, Connie finds her position within the hospital increasingly challenged. An emergency Board meeting is called in episode "It's Kinda Rock and Roll" with the intention of forcing Connie's resignation. However, the meeting ends up being chaired by Connie's own husband, Michael Beauchamp (Anthony Calf). Between them, Michael and Connie manipulate the situation so that Connie can keep her job, and the hospital's Chief Executive who put forth the motion against her is forced to resign. Connie is upset when Michael begins an affair with Matron Chrissie Williams (Tina Hobley), and in episode "Doing The Right Thing", finds evidence that Michael has committed fraud and unwittingly spread the VRSA through the hospital, resulting in the death of a patient. Michael is later arrested and jailed for manslaughter. Although he is released from prison after ten months, Connie declines to move abroad with him, and they divorce.

During series nine, it emerges that, following a brief relationship with her registrar Sam Strachan (Tom Chambers), Connie is pregnant with his child. She goes into labour and gave birth to her daughter, Grace Beauchamp in episode "Deep Dark Truthful Mirror" – going into premature labour after shocking herself with defibrillator paddles whilst operating on Lola Griffin. Grace was born breech and she had a double episiotomy, Grace is rushed to the Neonatal Intensive Care Unit. Sam is not allowed to attend the birth, and is kept distant from his daughter during her first few weeks of life, with Connie declining to inform him that she intends to turn off their daughter's life support when her ECG results show minimal brain-stem activity. Connie turns off Grace's ventilator. Doctor Ooma Chowdry asks Connie if she wants to hold Grace, but Connie shakes her head. However, as Sam holds his daughter, he notices Grace is breathing on her own. Grace pulls through, and Connie gradually begins to soften towards Sam and allow him increased access.

In a visit to her home town of Peckham, Connie discovers that her now-deceased mother suffered from depression during Connie's youth, a fact which her father had kept hidden from her. It is revealed that after her mother's death in 1995, Connie became estranged from her father for a period of twelve years. The pair reunite when Connie reveals he has a granddaughter and encourages him to receive treatment for his pulmonary condition.

In series ten of the show, Connie takes a sabbatical to carry out research in Hamburg. When she returns to Holby, she alienates herself from her staff with her insensitive approach to the aftermath of a crossbow attack which occurred while she was absent, killing a member of the nursing staff. In episode "We Serve All Who Come To Us", Connie ignores several calls from her temporary nanny in favour of performing pioneering surgery. As she leaves the hospital later that evening, she is shocked to be met by the nanny, who informs her Grace has fallen down the stairs and is badly injured. Grace is rushed to the paediatric intensive care unit. Grace requires surgery for a collapsed lung, and as she recovers, Sam, who has been diagnosed with Non-Hodgkin lymphoma, collapses from septic shock. Both father and daughter go on to make a full recovery.

In episode "Only Believe", Connie applies for the new Director of Surgery position, alongside Ric Griffin and Michael Spence (Hari Dhillon). She agrees with Ric to support his application on the understanding he will step down in six months time, and recommend her to assume the role in his place. She also begins a new romance with a man she knows only as "John". Through a series of clandestine meetings, she falls in love with him, and is shocked to discover he is the husband of her colleague and Holby City CEO Jayne Grayson (Stella Gonet). When John and Jayne's son, Christian, is rescued from drowning and Connie is asked to operate on him, she realises she cannot break up the family and ends her affair with John.

Throughout the show's eleventh season, Connie battles Ric for the Director of Surgery position when he refuses to step down as agreed. When she discovers Michael's anaesthetist wife Annalese Carson (Anna-Louise Plowman) has attended an operation which resulted in the death of a patient drunk, she reports her to Jayne, leading Annalese to leave Holby General. Jayne reveals to Connie that she suspects John is having an affair. Connie warns John, and discovers he is already seeing someone else. Jayne learns the truth then she observes the two of them rowing, and tells Connie that personal matters ought not affect their working relationship.

Connie goes on to apply for Director of Surgery, to replace Ric, who is resigning. After the interview the board are seen deciding whom to allocate the job to, and Jayne, who is Holby's CEO, recommends an unofficial tie breaker. Michael Spence gets the job over Connie, due to the fact she allegedly ruined her marriage by having an affair with John. Connie later resigns but Spence blackmails Jayne into resigning, persuading Connie to stay at Holby.

Connie soon clashed with Jayne's replacement, Vanessa Lytton (Leslie Ash), an old friend of Michael's. Vanessa warned Michael that she believed Connie was after his job as Director of Surgery. When Faye Morton's (Patsy Kensit) son Archie died in suspicious circumstances, Joseph pleads with both Connie and Ric to lie to Vanessa, telling her that they had authorised Faye to inject Archie with saline despite the fact that she wasn't officially on duty. When no clear cause of death could be initially determined, Vanessa suspends the pair until the matter is resolved. Following Lauren Minster's confession that she had given Archie an incorrect dose of potassium, the suspension was lifted but it was revealed that Connie had had enough of Holby and taken up a new position at the Trafalgar Hospital in London.

In February 2010, both Michael and Elliot visited Connie and persuaded her to return - but the only way Connie would ever set foot in Holby again is if Vanessa would leave. Connie returned on 9 March 2010, when her old friend and colleague Elliot Hope (Paul Bradley) begged her help as her replacement Toby Geddes abandoned him in a recent hostage situation to treat patients alone. Connie then decides to stay which resulted with Geddes being fired and Vanessa leaving Holby.

Connie later becomes joint Director of Surgery with Henrik Hanssen (Guy Henry), and is deeply unhappy about making members of staff redundant as part of The Coalition's NHS spending cuts. When Connie discovers that Hanssen is planning to fire Elliot, she does everything in her power to prove to Hanssen that Elliot is a brilliant surgeon and a valuable asset.

In December 2010, Connie's father is rushed into Holby requiring an operation, and as a result she learns that he has Alzheimer's. During the operation, her father nearly dies, but he is saved by Elliot and Faye. After the anguish of the redundancies and the situation with her father, Connie decides that she can't work at Holby any more, and hands her resignation to Hanssen. Before she leaves, she tells Hanssen that firing Elliot would be a big mistake. Connie later meets with Jac Naylor (Rosie Marcel), giving her some final tips and fashion advice. She revealed to Jac that she will be working in Brussels two days a week for the European Transplant Board, as well as caring for her father. Upon hearing that Jac has been hired as her replacement, she sends her a bottle of champagne and a pair of her shoes with a card saying "Fill them!".

Connie reappeared in Holby City briefly at the behest of the hospital's CEO, Guy Self (John Michie). She met Jac's former boyfriend, Jonny Maconie (Michael Thomson) and seemed to have heard about him before and was left shocked when he made his first impression. Connie then aided Jac in a complicated endarterectomy procedure and visited Elliot who was currently in recovery. Her comments help push Jac into taking Elliot's job as clinical lead of Darwin and the Herzig 5 project.

Connie reappeared in Holby City once more after the events of Too Old for this Shift when a helicopter crashes into the hospitals emergency department. She is seen talking to Fletch whilst on Intensive Care.

=== Casualty ===
In March 2014, Connie returned to Holby City Hospital after being recruited by new CEO Guy Self (John Michie) to work as a consultant in the Emergency Department. She instantly clashes with clinical lead, Zoe Hanna (Sunetra Sarker) when she disobeys her instructions by going out to an accident with the paramedics. She forms an attachment with nurse Robyn Miller (Amanda Henderson), who goes with her to the accident. In June 2014, Zoe resigns from her Clinical Lead status after a helicopter crash, and offers the role to Connie, who immediately accepts. Connie then begins to redeem the ED and bring it to its best. Registrar, Caleb Knight (Richard Winsor) is seen flirting with Connie a lot, despite her rejections.

By the beginning of 2015, after 6 months of managing the ED, Connie's leadership skills are put to the test when she gets a GMC hearing and her daughter Grace leaves to join her father Sam Strachan in New York, causing a breakdown from Connie. A disastrous inspection soon follows, and she blames Clinical Nurse Manager Rita Freeman for the loss of Grace, promising her that she will be out within 6 months, and Connie throws herself into work. Charlie Fairhead asks her why she is setting such "high standards" for her ED staff to follow; she reveals that it is because her father died in an overcrowded emergency department corridor, also explaining her change of department. She later became close to Motor Neurone Disease sufferer and ex-cardiothoracic surgeon Alfred Maxwell (Michael Byrne). Rita accused Connie of carrying out euthanasia on Maxwell, and she was sent to court, with Rita removing vital evidence from Connie's office. Mealing revealed that Casualty bosses had lined up a season of storylines for the actress, as she said in an interview: "The initial idea we had for Connie was to have a year of seasons. She arrived in Holby during her spring. Taking over the ED was her summer. And in autumn she began to disintegrate after she lost Grace. Alfred's arrival marks her winter of despair."

Grace returned to Casualty in Hearts and Flowers and Connie fought to make Grace stay with her. Grace discovers that Connie is in a relationship with Jacob Masters which results in conflict between Connie and Jacob. When new consultant Elle Gardner joins, Connie discovers that she grew up with Jacob, making her feel intimidated. In Sticks and Stones Connie's car crashed into a ravine, leaving Connie and Grace seriously injured.

In 2017 Connie experienced chest pains and breathlessness. She sought private medical investigation which found a left-atrial leiomyosarcoma. Connie kept her cancer diagnosis secret from everyone except Ethan Hardy, who at one stage had to perform an emergency embolectomy when an embolus thrown off from the tumour blocked the blood flow to her right arm. Her continual refusal of treatment and attempts to hide her condition began to negatively impact her work, raising suspicions amongst other staff members. Ethan persuaded Connie to begin chemotherapy, which led to her losing her hair. Connie insisted on coming into work even when the chemotherapy left her immunosuppressed. Eventually, an infection acquired at work led to her collapsing in resus (where Ethan was forced to explain her condition to all the staff members). After self-discharging from HDU, Connie insisted Ethan drive her to London for surgery and, despite her health seriously deteriorating, her life was saved.

== Reception ==
Discussing public reception of her character, Mealing states that: "The response has been amazing - from men, women and children. I'm often stopped out shopping or dining etc. and told 'You're so mean to (whoever).. but we love you!' I think there's a little in all of us that would like to say what we really feel, the way Connie does". Mealing has received several award nominations for the role; ranking seventh 'Best Actress' in the 2004 BBC Drama Awards, being nominated 'Best Actress' in the 2005 TV Quick Awards, and 'Best Newcomer' in the 2005 National TV Awards.

The storyline which saw Connie's infant daughter Grace injured after falling downstairs was received critically by The Guardian's Sarah Dempster, who summarised: "Four years after she first dazzled viewers with her ability to smirk at current hospital expenditure figures while simultaneously patronising sobbing cardio patients, Connie Beauchamp finds herself beset, suddenly and violently, by actual emotion when her daughter falls down the stairs. What follows is a thinly veiled condemnation of working mothers and their potentially deadly desire to occasionally leave the house. Can it really be 1985 already? Apparently so". Fellow Guardian journalist Kathryn Flett deemed the storyline "gripping", and commented that "I empathised hugely with Connie", explaining "although she may be tough and cool and careerist, and therefore have her priorities completely gluteus maximus-over-mammary, she's also a Good Woman who Deserves a Break". Flett's overview of the episode was that: "Despite containing so many mixed messages about whether working mothers should be punished or celebrated it would have needed a dedicated team at Bletchley to decode them all, this was top-notch primetime telly - and a tour-de-force from (working mother of two) Amanda Mealing."

The Daily Mirror's Jim Shelley named Connie his fictional "Egomaniac of the week" during her series ten campaign to become the hospital's Director of Surgery, referring to her response to colleague Elliot Hope's inquiry whether she felt opening up the position up to external candidates was a waste of time: "Of course it is. How many incredible candidates can there be?!" Fellow Mirror writer Jane Simon examined Connie in contrast to the "unpleasant rash of annoyingly wet and whispering male docs" resident in Holby City Hospital in September 2008, noting favourably in comparison Connie's ability to silence an entire room with her "death stare".

In August 2017, Mealing was longlisted for Best Drama Star at the Inside Soap Awards. She made the viewer-voted shortlist, but lost out to George Rainsford, who portrays Ethan Hardy.
