= James Anderson (English actor) =

British actor (born 1980)

- Born: 3 November 1980 (age 45); Thursley, Surrey, England
- Education: Frensham Heights; University of Warwick; Actors Studio
- Occupation: Actor
- Years active: 2006-present
- Children: 2

James Anderson (born 3 November 1980) is a British actor.

Born in the Surrey village of Thursley, Anderson graduated with first class honours from Warwick University and went on to train at the Actors Studio (MFA) in New York City. He has since had roles across TV, stage and film.

He is known for playing Oliver Valentine on the BBC medical drama Holby City between 2009 and 2021.

For his debut film he was recipient of the Gold Hugo Award (2006), gaining eligibility for an Academy Award (2008).

== Personal life ==
James is married with two children and lives in Sussex.

== Awards & Nominations ==
| Year | Prize | Festival | Film | Result |
|---|---|---|---|---|
| 2006 | Gold Hugo Award for Best Short film (with Robert Postrozny) | Chicago International Film Festival | Forgetting Betty | Winner |
| 2007 | Best Student Short Film (with Robert Postrozny) | Cinequest San Jose Film Festival | Forgetting Betty | Winner |

== Selected filmography ==
- The Crow Girl (2026)
- A Taste for Murder (2026)
- The Lady (2026)
- The Bombing of Pan Am 103 (2025)
- FBI: International (2025)
- Professor T (2025)
- Endeavour (2023)
- Holby City (2009–21)
- Agatha Raisin (2020)
- Father Brown (2020)
- Agatha Christie's Poirot (2013)
- Rock Rivals (2007)
- Forgetting Betty (2006)
