= Amanda Mealing =

English actress

- Born: Amanda Jane Mealing; 22 April 1967 (age 59)
- Education: Italia Conti Academy of Theatre Arts
- Occupation: Actress
- Years active: 1973–present
- Television: Holby City; Casualty
- Spouse: Richard Sainsbury (m. 1998)
- Children: 2

Amanda Jane Mealing (born 22 April 1967) is an English actress, director and producer, known for playing Connie Beauchamp in the BBC medical dramas Holby City and Casualty.

== Early life ==
The only adopted member of her family, Mealing was the youngest of four children, with two sisters and an elder brother. She grew up in Dulwich, South London, with her adoption being a secret. Although very much part of a strong and loving family, she was always aware that she looked nothing like her siblings and was left feeling that she did not quite fit in. Despite a yearning to know more about her biological parents, Mealing was concerned that looking for them would upset her family. When she was 15 years old, Mealing's brother died after using heroin. Although he was 14 years her senior, they were very close and it affected her deeply. Realising that "life can be short ... there's no point sitting around", she was influenced to "do stuff".

== Career ==
Originally known as Mandy Mealing, her first professional performance was in a Julie Andrews special on BBC television at the age of six. She then started Saturday classes at the Italia Conti Academy, before enrolling full-time at the age of nine. Parts in Just William, The Morecambe & Wise Show and Premiere followed, before she was cast as comprehensive-school pupil Tracy Edwards in Phil Redmond's long-running BBC One children's drama series Grange Hill.

Mealing appeared in The Darling Buds of May, Four Weddings and a Funeral, In Deep, Capital City, The Bill, Midsomer Murders, and Delise in the 1990 mini series The Gravy Train. She appeared in the TV miniseries, Jake's Progress, as Robert Lindsay's love interest, in 1995. She played Ruth Manning in the first series of Russell T Davies' 1920s period drama series The Grand in 1997, and JoJo in Jimmy McGovern's The Lakes in 1999. Alan Bleasdale wrote the part of Katie in "Jake's Progress" for Amanda after working with her on GBH.

Mealing appeared as cardiothoracic consultant Connie Beauchamp in BBC One's medical drama series Holby City from 1 June 2004 to 28 December 2010, announcing her decision to quit Holby City in October 2010.

On 16 July 2010, Mealing appeared on ITV's The Five O'Clock Show with Jason Donovan and Corrine Bailey Rae. In 2011, Mealing appeared in the Sky1 series Strike Back: Project Dawn as Colonel Eleanor Grant. In 2013, Mealing appeared in an episode of the BBC series Death in Paradise. Mealing also appeared in the latest series of ITV's Law and Order: UK playing a solicitor. On 29 March 2014, Mealing reprised her role as Connie Beauchamp in Holby City's sister show Casualty. After seven years on Casualty, she announced in March 2021 that she would be taking an "extended break" from the series, but confirmed that she would return in the future.

=== Directing ===
On 26 February 2016, when being interviewed on This Morning, Mealing was asked about directing, and about her directing three episodes of Casualty. She also directed a short film titled Another Man's Shoes. In 2019, Mealing directed an episode of the CBBC series The Dumping Ground. In 2021, while on her extended break from Casualty, Mealing joined the ITV soap opera Coronation Street as a director.

On 20 April 2022, Mealing announced via Instagram she has joined Waterloo Road as a director.

== Personal life ==
=== Relationships and children ===
Mealing has been married to screenwriter Richard Sainsbury since 1998, they have two sons. The family originally lived on a farm in Lincolnshire, but when filming of Casualty moved to Cardiff from Bristol, the family relocated to South Wales. Paul O'Grady was a close friend of Mealing and, alongside Charlie Condou, was a godfather to her sons. She has appeared on The Paul O'Grady Show on several occasions, sometimes with her sons. Mealing is the godmother of TV presenter Miquita Oliver.

After the birth of her first son, the desire to find out more about her background became "hard to ignore"; she also wanted him to "know his heritage". Investigations took Mealing to New York, where she eventually found her birth mother, a model for Biba in London during the Swinging Sixties. She discovered that her biological father was a half-Ghanaian poet and activist. She gets on well with her mother and takes the children to visit her in New York but her father died some years earlier. She also found out that she has a sister, a year younger, also adopted in Britain. Her sister did not know of the relationship until she was 16, but had watched Mealing in Grange Hill, with people saying 'you look like that girl on TV'. Now close, when they first met their similarities were unbelievable — "we talk the same, walk the same, even our actions are the same". With a desire to reconnect with her roots and acknowledge her father, and as an ambassador, Mealing has worked with Save the Children in Sierra Leone. She filmed a documentary about Kroo Bay — a slum built on the rubbish discarded by Freetown — saying: "It's the worst place in the world you could grow up as child. One child in four will die before they reach five years old."

=== Health ===
The day after giving birth to her second son, Mealing was diagnosed with breast cancer in August 2002. Mealing was asked to be an ambassador for Breast Cancer Care in early 2010. She has developed a close bond with the charity. "When I was diagnosed the first leaflet I received was from Breast Cancer Care. They have been there for me ever since. I am deeply honoured to be given a chance to give something back to them." After losing a close friend to breast cancer early the same year Amanda decided to dedicate a JustGiving page to raise money in memory of her friend. She ran the 2012 London Marathon on her 45th birthday for Breast Cancer Care.

=== Car collision ===
Mealing was involved in a three-vehicle collision on the A1175 near Hop Pole, Lincolnshire, on 26 January 2024. At a hearing at Boston Magistrates' Court on 14 March 2025, she pleaded guilty to driving while under the influence of drugs, having tested positive for cocaine and benzoylecgonine in a roadside test. She also pleaded guilty to driving without due care and attention. Mealing was banned from driving for 22 months, fined £485, and ordered to pay £400 in court costs and a surcharge of £194.

=== Charity ===
Since 2015, Mealing has been a Patron to the Nationwide Association of Blood Bikes.

== Filmography ==
Year	Title	Roles	Notes
1980	Grange Hill	Tracy Edwards	TV series
1985	Relative Strangers	Amanda	TV series
1990	Capital City	Fiorella	TV series
1990	The Gravy Train	Delise	TV miniseries
1992	Anglo-Saxon Attitudes	Elvira Portway	TV miniseries
1992	The House of Eliott	Jessie Christy	TV series
1994	Grushko	Tanya	TV miniseries
1994	Requiem Apache	Marilyn	TV movie
1994	Blood on the Dole	Laura	TV movie
1994	Four Weddings and a Funeral	Naughty Nicki – Wedding Two	Film
1995	The Detectives	Emily Ford	TV series
1995	Jake's Progress	Kate	TV series
1997	The Grand	Ruth Manning	TV series
1997	The Girl with Brains in Her Feet	Vivienne Jones	Film
1999	The Lakes	Jo Jo Spiers	TV series
2001	Midsomer Murders	Sally Boulter	Episode: "Electric Vendetta"
2001	In Deep	Anee-Marie Griffin	Series 1
2004–2010, 2014, 2016, 2019	Holby City	Connie Beauchamp	TV series
2004–2005, 2007, 2014–2021	Casualty	Connie Beauchamp	Guest (2004–2007); Main role; also directed 4 episodes (2016–2022)
2004	Lie With Me	Carolyn Henson	TV miniseries
2005	Zemanovaload	Dr. Zemekis	Film
2011	Strike Back: Project Dawn	Colonel Eleanor Grant	TV series
2013	Death in Paradise	Eloise Morrison	TV series
2014	Still	Rachel	Film
2016	Bucky	Newsreader	Short film
2017	Retribution	Captain Whittard	Film
2019	The Dumping Ground	—N/a	Director: "Reunion" (series 7, episode 22)
2021	Coronation Street	—N/a	Director: 3 episodes
2023	Waterloo Road	—N/a	Director: Series 11, episode 5 and Series 12, episode 2
