= Hanssen/Hemingway =

- Holby City episode
- Episode no.: Season 15; Episode 13
- Directed by: Rob Evans
- Written by: Justin Young
- Original air date: 8 January 2013
- Running time: 56 minutes

Guest appearances
- Jeff Rawle as Jerry Clark; Etela Pardo as Jelena Nowak; Magnus Mark as Nils Johansson; Sven-Bertil Taube as Anders Lövborg; Pia Halvorsen as Maja Johansson; Serge Soric as Branko Nowak

Episode chronology
← Previous "Blood Ties"	Next → "Push the Button – Part 1"
- Holby City series 15

"Hanssen/Hemingway" is the thirteenth episode of the fifteenth series of the British medical drama Holby City. It was written by Justin Young and directed by Rob Evans. "Hanssen/Hemingway" first aired on 8 January 2013 on BBC One in the United Kingdom. It is one of the show's frequent standalone episodes, which features two stories; one on location and one set in Holby City Hospital. Young, who was also the consultant series producer at the time, confirmed in an August 2012 interview that there were plans to explore the fictional backstory of Henrik Hanssen (Guy Henry), the hospital's CEO, who was introduced in 2010. Young confirmed that the show would also reveal more about registrar Luc Hemingway (Joseph Millson), whose background, like Hanssen, had yet to be explored. In the same interview, Young revealed that the producers had just come up with an idea for a new episode set abroad and they were in the early planning stages.

Four months later, the BBC announced details of the special episode focusing on Hanssen and Luc, with one of the storylines set and filmed in Sweden. The plot sees Jac Naylor (Rosie Marcel) travelling to Stockholm to track down Hanssen, who has gone AWOL. Meanwhile, at the hospital, Luc is struggling with past events despite help from his colleagues. Young called the episode "one of the most ambitious" in the show's history. Marcel and Henry travelled to Sweden to film the episode, and Henry was pleased to get away from the Holby City set. Hanssen's estranged father is introduced in the episode and their history is slowly revealed to viewers when his company offer Holby City Hospital a partnership deal. Henry said that as the episode progresses, his character learns that things were not what he thought they were. Viewers also learn that Hanssen abandoned his former girlfriend when she became pregnant with their son. Henry was surprised by the development and said it was "an emotional episode" for his character.

"Hanssen/Hemingway" marks the final appearance of Luc. Producers did not announce Millson's departure before the episode aired in order to surprise viewers. His final scene hints that he will reunite with his love interest Eddi McKee (Sarah-Jane Potts). Young was pleased to bring fans of the couple a possible happy ending. The episode features guest appearances from Jeff Rawle as Luc's psychiatrist, and Swedish singer Sven-Bertil Taube as Hanssen's father Anders Lövborg. For Taube, the role marked the first time in a while that he had acted in English. The episode was well received by critics, with Katy Moon of Inside Soap saying it had been "eagerly" anticipated. Jane Simon of the Daily Mirror chose it as her "Pick of the Day", and Sue Haasler, author of Holby City: Behind The Screen, praised Young's script and Henry and Millson's emotional performances.

== Plot ==
Serena Campbell (Catherine Russell) sends Jac Naylor (Marcel) to Sweden to find Henrik Hanssen (Henry), who disappeared from Holby City Hospital eight weeks ago, having turned down a $40 million partnership deal from pharmaceutical company Biotek. Sacha Levy (Bob Barrett) finds Luc Hemingway (Millson) in the lab, where he has been all night since giving a patient an unlicensed drug during surgery. Michael Spence (Hari Dhillon) orders Luc to see a psychiatrist in order to keep his job. During the session with Jerry Clark (Rawle), Luc is asked about the incident in theatre and how it seemed to remind Luc of a particular time and place. Luc becomes defensive when Jerry brings up his fiancée Elise Laurier and he leaves. In Stockholm, Jac locates Hanssen and asks why he is trying to block the Biotek proposal, but he tells her to go home. After meeting with his friend and head of Biotek, Nils Johansson (Magnus Mark), Hanssen goes to see his father Anders (Taube), who is dying of cancer. He asks him to withdraw the deal, but Anders thinks Hanssen would have been grateful for the lifeline. Hanssen is reunited with his former partner Maja Johansson (Pia Halvorsen) and he states that it was a mistake coming. Luc returns to work, where he and Sacha struggle to diagnose Jelena Nowak (Etela Pardo), who is exhibiting paranoia, hallucinations and fever. She does not recognise her husband, Branko (Serge Soric), and goes into a coma. Michael takes over her care and orders Luc to meet with Jerry again.

Back in Sweden, Jac learns that Anders used Nazi research to found Biotek. Maja wonders how Hanssen can judge his father when he abandoned her when she was pregnant with their son. Hanssen blames his father for his mother's suicide, as she was a Danish Jew. During their next session, a story Jerry tells Luc about war veterans, leads Luc to realise that Jelena has tick-borne encephalitis. His attempts to get into his padlocked lab alert security. When Serena asks why the lab was locked, Luc tells what happened during surgery and she suspends him. Luc returns to Jerry and explains that Elise died after she was shot on duty with the army. He could not help because he had been drinking. Luc leaves Sacha a goodbye note, saying that he is going to try something radical, he is going to live. Jac visits Hanssen, revealing that she knows why he is blocking the Biotek deal. He says that he just wanted to escape. Hanssen apologises to Maja for abandoning her and their son. Maja then reveals that his mother told Anders to use the research, so that her brother's death had not been worthless. She killed herself because she thought Anders was dead not because he betrayed her. Hanssen visits Anders and holds his hand as he dies. When Maja asks Hanssen if he wants to meet his son, he tells her another time.

== Production ==
=== Conception ===
"Hanssen/Hemingway" is one of the show's frequent standalone episodes, which features two stories; one on location and one set in the hospital. Episode 13 is typically the standalone episode, as it falls just after the New Year. During an August 2012 interview with Daniel Kilkelly of Digital Spy, Holby City's consultant series producer Justin Young confirmed that there were plans to finally explore the past and personal life of Henrik Hanssen (Guy Henry), who was introduced in 2010. Young also confirmed that he was writing "a big episode" for the character, which would finally reveal details of where "he's come from and who he really is." Young stated: "I've always said that I don't want to give too much away about Hanssen, because I think the mystery around him is what people love. At the same time, we've known him now for nearly two years and I think the time has come to learn a bit more about him." When asked about plans for Luc Hemingway (Joseph Millson), Young said that the writers were also planning to reveal more about the character, as not much was known about him and his background at the time. They wanted the viewers to see what made the character "tick". Young pointed out that both Hanssen and Luc were "intriguing because we know so little about them".

Young also told Kilkelly that the producers had just thought of a new idea for an episode set abroad and were in the early planning stages for it. He believed it could be better than the recent fourteenth series episode "Wise Men" set and filmed in Ukraine. He explained that filming abroad with multiple characters could be "difficult" as they did not want it to seem "contrived." He thought that there needed to be legitimate and "logical" reasons for the show to film in other countries. Young said the new episode would air shortly after the Christmas period. On 10 December 2012, the BBC announced that they would be airing a special episode set in Sweden on 8 January 2013. The episode's plot features Jac Naylor (Rosie Marcel) travelling to Stockholm to find out what has happened to Hanssen who has gone AWOL. Meanwhile, at the hospital, Luc struggles with past events and appears to be "heading off the rails" despite help from his colleagues. Young called the storyline "one of the most ambitious episodes Holby's ever made." He added "With extraordinary performances and a stunning visual backdrop, it's an epic, cinematic episode which takes viewers on what we hope will be an unforgettable journey to the very heart of our two most enigmatic characters: Luc Hemingway and Henrik Hanssen. It's a story about love, confronting the past, and – for one of our characters – new beginnings."

=== Development ===
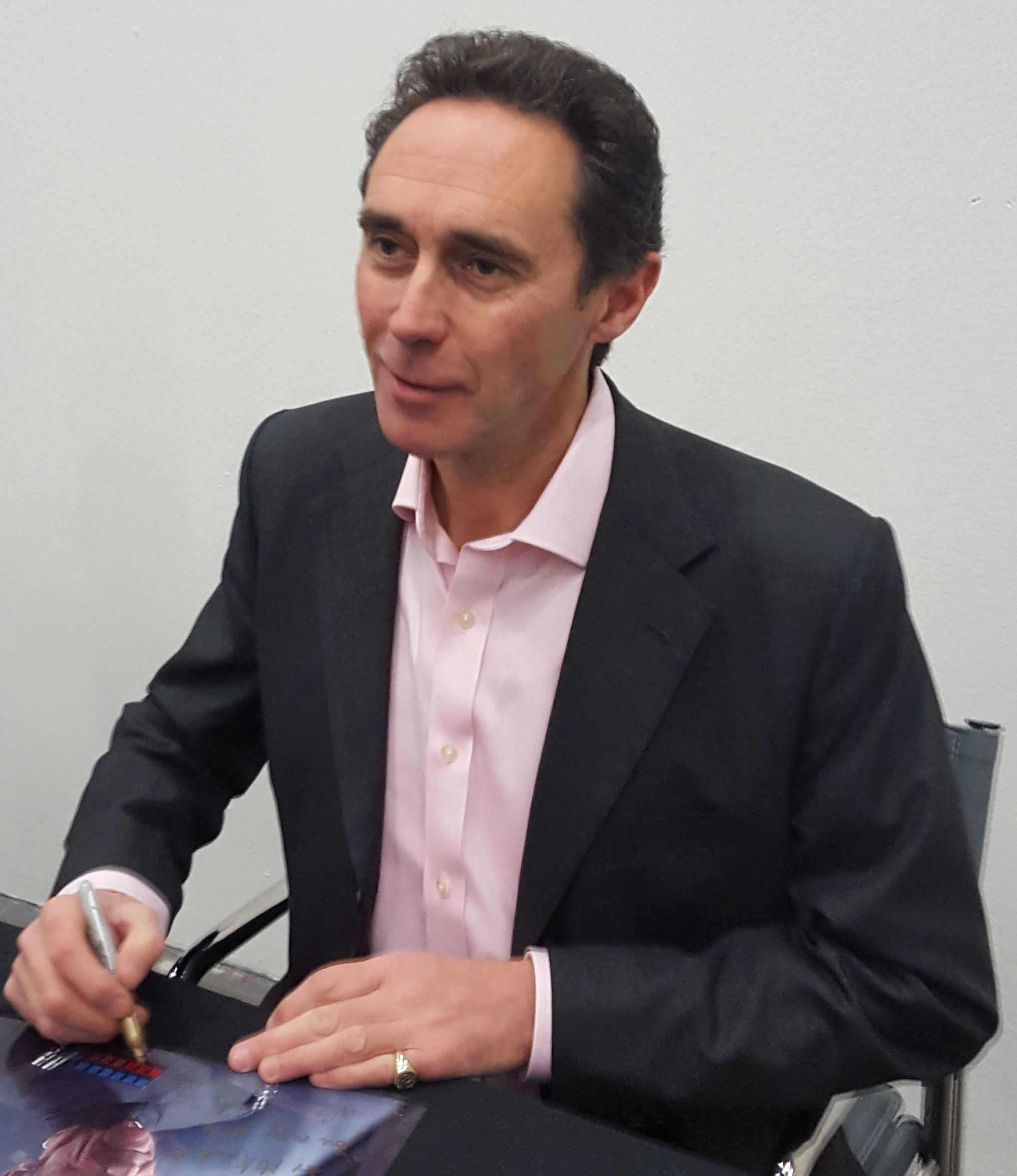
The episode explores the fictional backstory and family relationships of Henrik Hanssen, played by Guy Henry (pictured).

Marcel and Henry were the only two cast members to travel to Sweden to film the episode. Henry admitted that he was excited to get away from the Holby City set and go to Sweden. He thought it was nice to get Hanssen out of the hospital, where he tends to loom in corridors, and into "a very meaty situation". Henry revealed that the crew got to work on speedboats and joked that it was quicker than his usual route to work. He also commented that the script manages to get around the fact that he does not speak Swedish well in the episode. Henry explained that Hanssen was "lured" to Stockholm by his friend Nils Johansson, the chairman of a pharmaceutical company who wants to give Holby £40 million. Henry told Katy Moon of Inside Soap that Hanssen and Jac have "a heart-to-heart" in his "soulless" apartment, where he reveals that his father founded the company, but their work was developed using Nazi research. Hanssen has long considered his father dead to him, as he believes it was "reprehensible" to use the research. He also believes that this contributed to the suicide of his Jewish mother.

It emerges that Hanssen's father, Anders Lövborg, is alive, but he is dying of cancer. Eventually Hanssen decides to visit Anders for the first time in 36 years. Henry commented "Hanssen discovers that not everything is what he thought it was." Hanssen is also reunited with his former girlfriend Maja, who he walked out on when she became pregnant with their son, Fredrik. Hanssen's son does not know who his real father is, as he was raised by Nils. Henry expressed his surprise at the development, saying "We don't know anything about Hanssen until now... then it all comes out at once!" He thought that Hanssen leaves everyone because he feels "tainted" by his father and is unable to commit to them how he wants. He also stated that Hanssen has spent 36 years without knowing the truth and he ends up regretting walking out on his father, Maja and his son. Henry called it "an emotional episode" for his character and believed it showed why Hanssen is always "so cold and lonely." Henry admitted that there was "a lot of staring out at the Baltic sea, and there may be some sobbing." He found it easier to cry during the scenes due to the cold weather. Henry confirmed that Hanssen would be returning to Holby for a short stint.

"Hanssen/Hemingway" marks the final appearance of Luc. Producers did not announce Millson's departure before the episode aired in order to surprise viewers. Of his exit from the drama, Millson stated "I enjoyed every moment of my time on Holby City. I believe it is a greatly underappreciated gem in the BBC's crown. Every single department excels, and at its best – tonight's 'Hanssen/Hemingway' episode for example – the writing and production are as good as ANY single dramas out there." Millson expressed his gratitude to the writers for creating Luc and inspiring him. Young thanked Millson for his work on the show and said he and Luc would be missed by the crew. Luc's final scene hints that he would be travelling to Kerala in India to reunite with Eddi McKee (Sarah-Jane Potts). Young added that he was pleased to be able to give fans of the couple "the hope of a happy ending".

=== Guest cast ===
On 12 December 2012, Kilkelly (Digital Spy) reported that actor Jeff Rawle would appear in "Hanssen/Hemingway" as Jerry Clark, a psychiatrist. Kilkelly confirmed that Jerry would be sharing scenes with Luc, who has been asked to visit a psychiatrist due to his struggles at work. Casting director Liz Stoll travelled to Sweden to find cast members for the episode, and she cast Pia Halvorsen as Hanssen's former partner Maja Johansson. Magnus Mark plays Hanssen's friend Nils Johansson, who has raised his son Fredrik. Actor and singer Sven-Bertil Taube was cast as Hanssen's dying father. The role marked the first time in "a long time" since Taube had acted in an English speaking role. He revealed that the team wanted an older Swedish man, who spoke some English. Of his character's role in the episode, Taube said "It is about things that happen in Sweden, but the son has been in England the whole time for certain reasons. The meeting with my figure is dramatic because he lies dying." During their first day of filming in Sweden, Henry asked Taube if he lived nearby, and was surprised when Taube revealed that he actually lived in London.

== Reception ==
In its original broadcast, "Hanssen/Hemingway" was seen by 5.12 million viewers, equivalent to 21.4% of the total audience at 8pm. Katy Moon of Inside Soap stated: "We love it when our favourite shows take us to exciting new places – so we've been eagerly anticipating Holby City's special Swedish episode this week." Moon was looking forward to enjoying the Scandinavian landscape and learning more about Hanssen's "mysterious past". She also branded Luc's scenes with Jerry as "emotional".

Jane Simon from the Daily Mirror chose the episode as part of her Pick of the Day feature. Simon observed that seeing Hanssen in "a big old house where all the furniture is covered in dust sheets", listening to "mournful classical music" was right where viewers thought he would be. Simon also wrote: "Confronted with guest stars who are properly Swedish (instead of just pretending), tonight's episode also offers convenient explanations for why Hanssen's Swedish accent is a bit dodgy and why his surname is Danish in any case." She also thought Biotek was an unimaginative name for a biotech company, and that Jac clearly did not want to bring Hanssen back to Holby. Simon added that after the events of the previous week with Luc, this episode "means that we're wading knee-deep through back story, tears and melodrama, but also the classic line of dialogue: 'I'll have the moose heart.'"

Another Daily Mirror reporter included the episode in their "3 To See" column. Sue Haasler, the author of Holby City: Behind The Screen, praised the episode for living up to the hype and for its "beautiful panoramic views" of Stockholm. Haasler wrote that the two storylines and the actors involved "were what made the episode so outstanding." She thought Young's script was "brilliant", and believed that Hanssen's back story had been planned all along for it answered a lot of viewers' questions and his aloof personality made sense having heard about his past. Haasler praised Henry's performance, particularly his "masterful acting" when Hanssen met with his dying father, as well as Millson's, saying he "gave a raw and emotional performance."
