= List of Holby City characters =

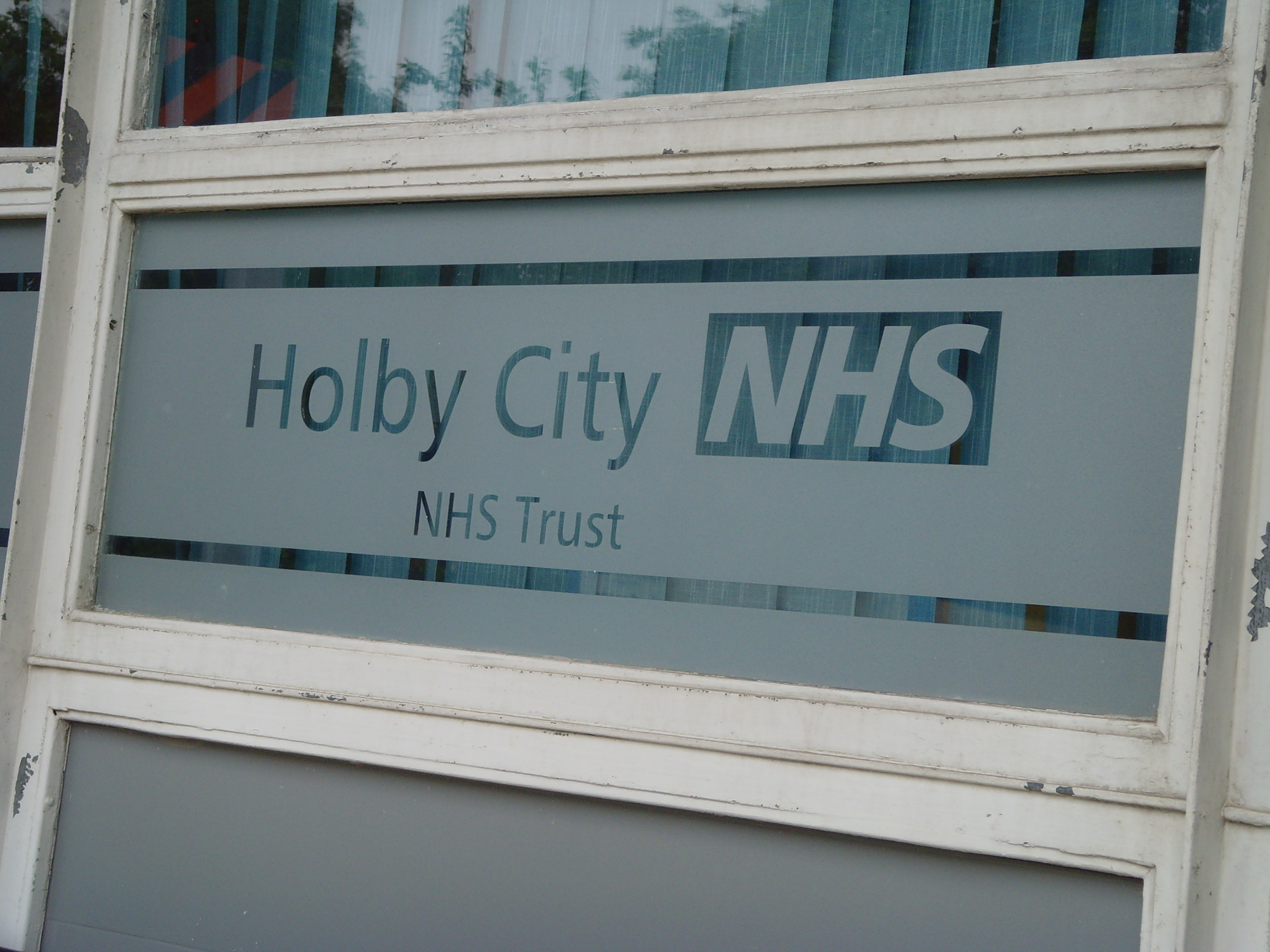
The set of Holby City, located at BBC Elstree Centre in Borehamwood.

Holby City is a British medical drama television series that was broadcast on BBC One in the United Kingdom between 12 January 1999 and 29 March 2022. The series was created by Tony McHale and Mal Young as a spin-off from the BBC medical drama Casualty, which is set in the emergency department of the fictional Holby City Hospital, based in the equally fictitious town of Holby. The show focuses on the fictional lives, both professional and personal, of the medical and ancillary staff on the hospital's surgical wards. It is primarily filmed at the BBC Elstree Centre in Borehamwood. The show aired twenty-three full series with more than 1,000 episodes. Young wanted to explore what happened to patients treated in Casualty once they were taken away to the hospital's surgical wards. He opined that Casualty limited itself to "accident of the week" storylines, while Holby City allowed the possibility of storylines about long-term care, rather than immediate life-and-death decisions. A police procedural spin-off, HolbyBlue, began airing from 8 May 2007, running for two series before being cancelled due to poor viewing figures.

The serial features an ensemble cast of regular and recurring characters, and began with 11 main characters in its first series. Characters have since been written in and out of the series, and 16 actors were employed to the show's main cast at its finale. Having appeared in more than 500 episodes between the fourth and twenty-third series, the show's longest-serving character is Ric Griffin, portrayed by Hugh Quarshie. Additionally, Holby City features a number of guest artists in each episode as well as recurring characters who appear in story arcs. Many regular cast members in the show have made prior, minor appearances as both patients and staff members in both Holby City and Casualty. In 2015, casting directors hired Niamh Walsh for the regular role of Cara Martinez after a guest part as a patient in Casualty. Producers will sometimes recast significant recurring characters when their original actors are unavailable for another stint. When the character of Beka Levy was reintroduced in 2018, her original actress Rhean McGee could not reprise the role, so they recast the role to Francesca Barrett. Characters from Holby City have appeared in sister shows Casualty and HolbyBlue and vice versa. Although most characters only guest star, some have become regular cast members. Amanda Mealing joined Casualty as Connie Beauchamp in 2014, following a six-year stint in Holby City. Nick Jordan actor Michael French has had stints in the main cast of both Holby City and Casualty, and Clive Mantle reprised his role as Mike Barratt in Holby City in 1999, two years after leaving Casualty.

== Regular characters ==
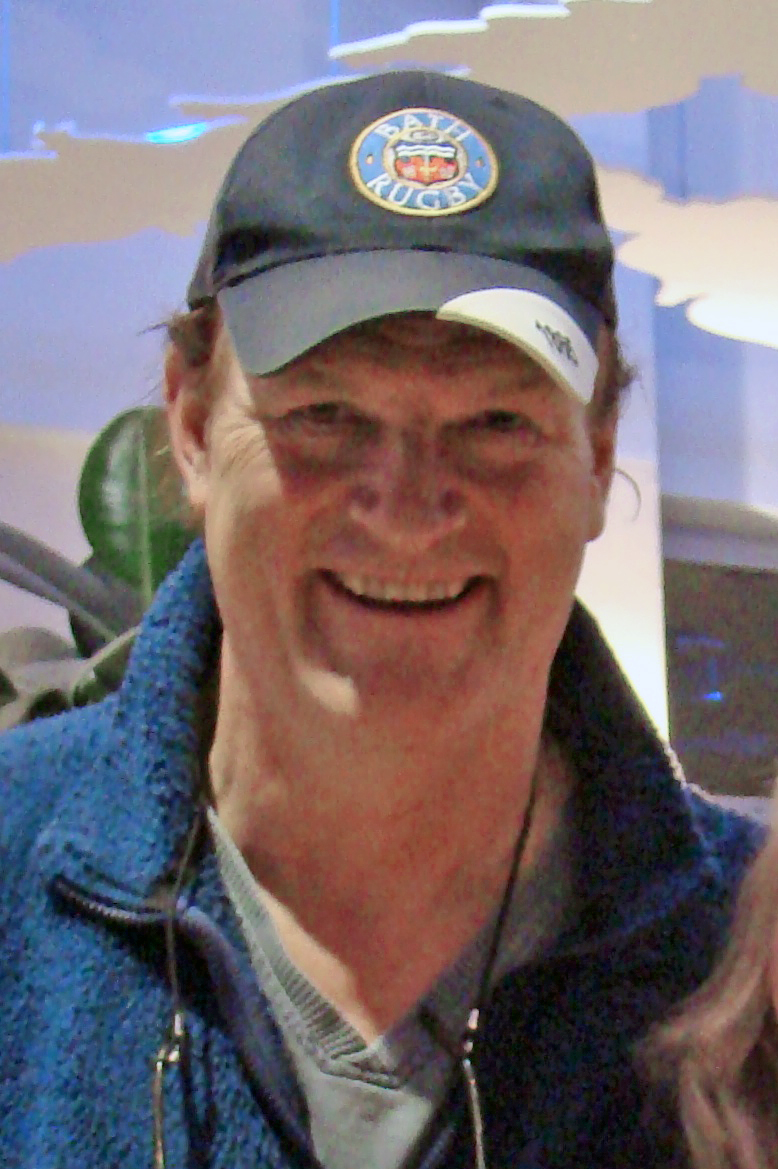
Clive Mantle starred as Mike Barratt, having reprised the role from Casualty.

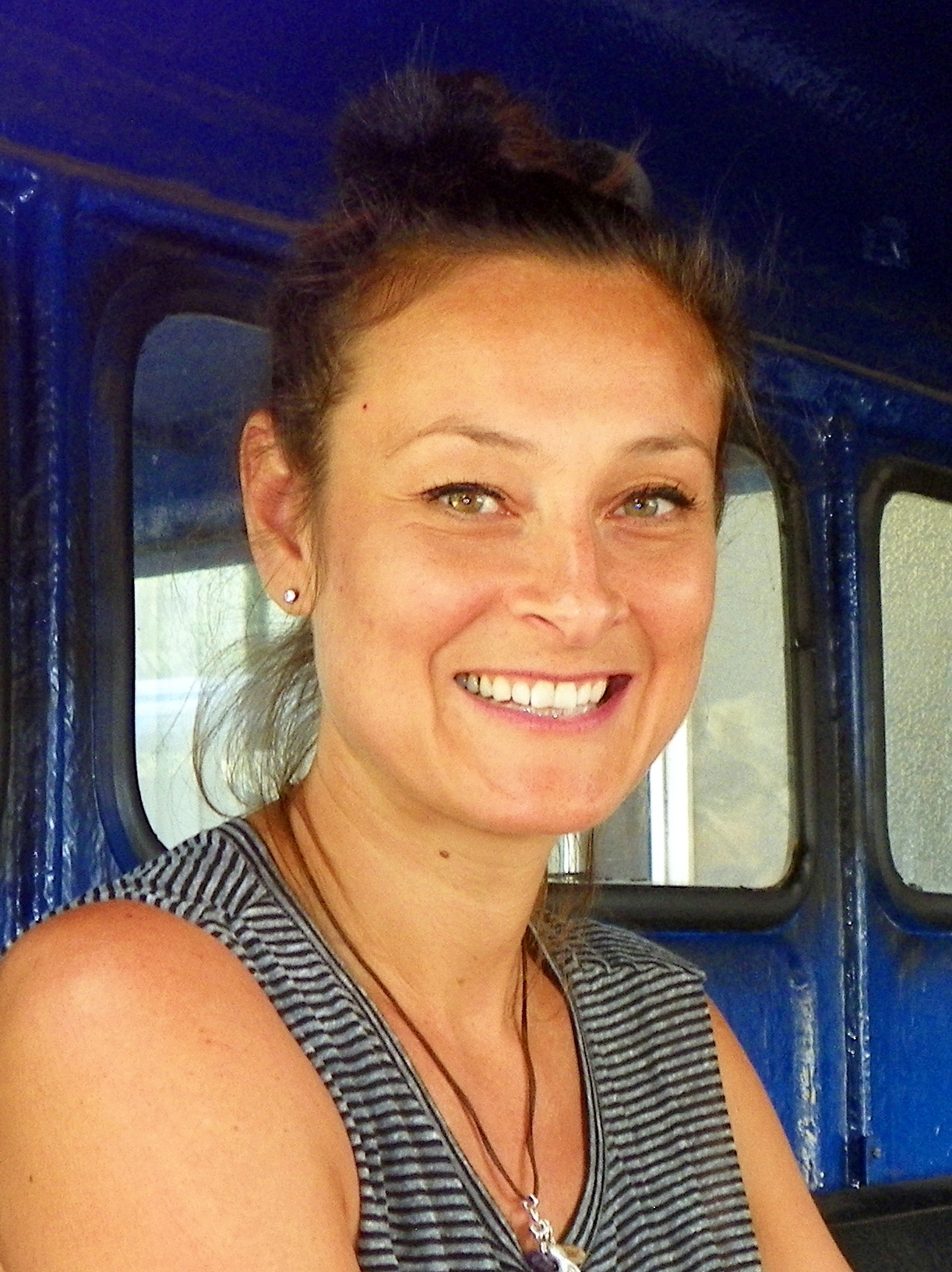
Luisa Bradshaw-White starred as Lisa Fox.

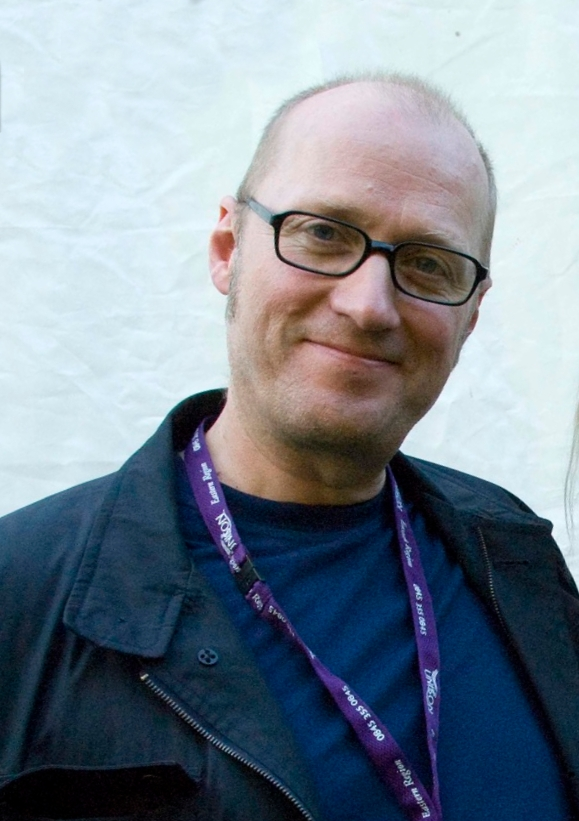
Ade Edmondson appeared as Abra Durant across multiple stints.

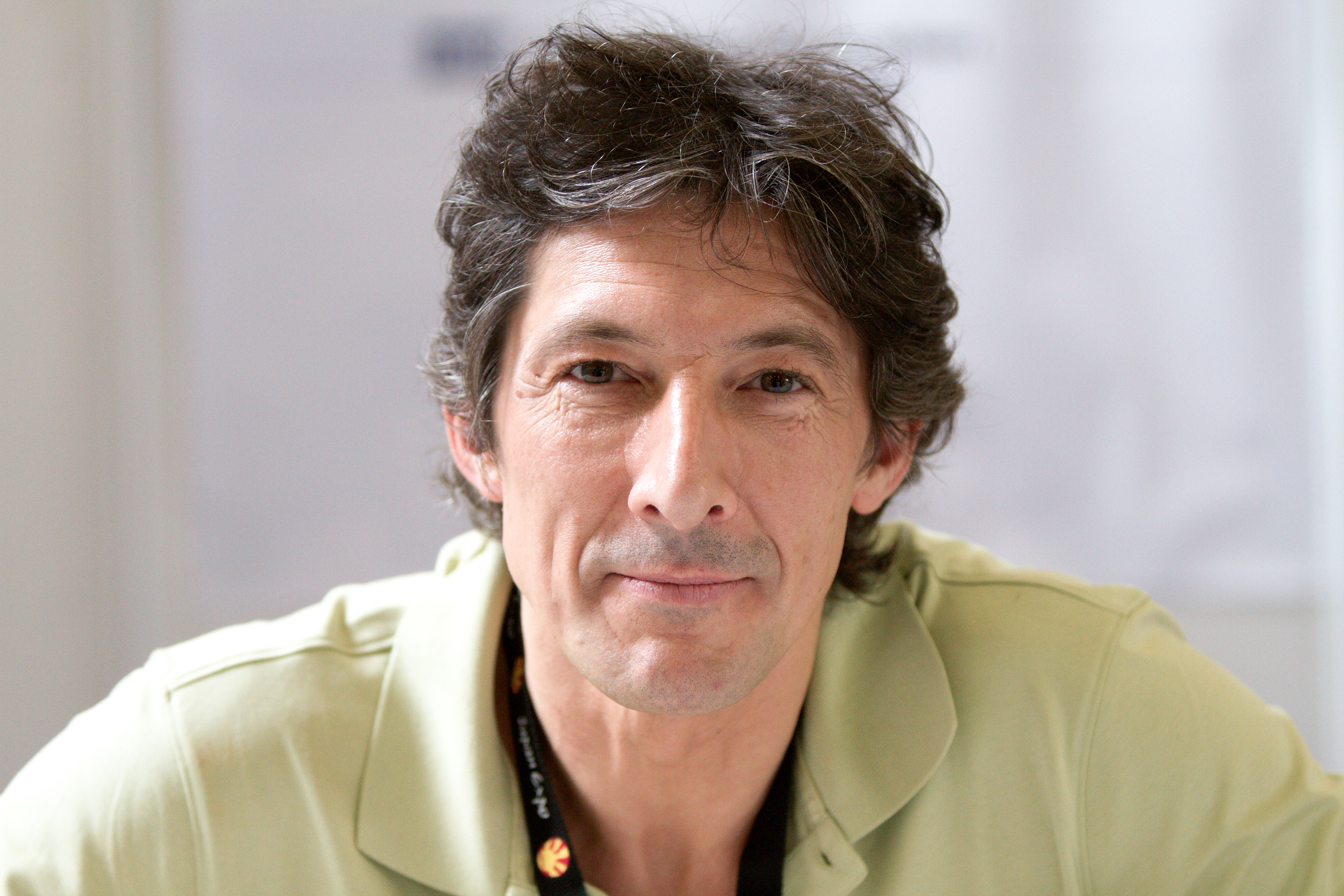
Peter Wingfield portrayed Dan Clifford.

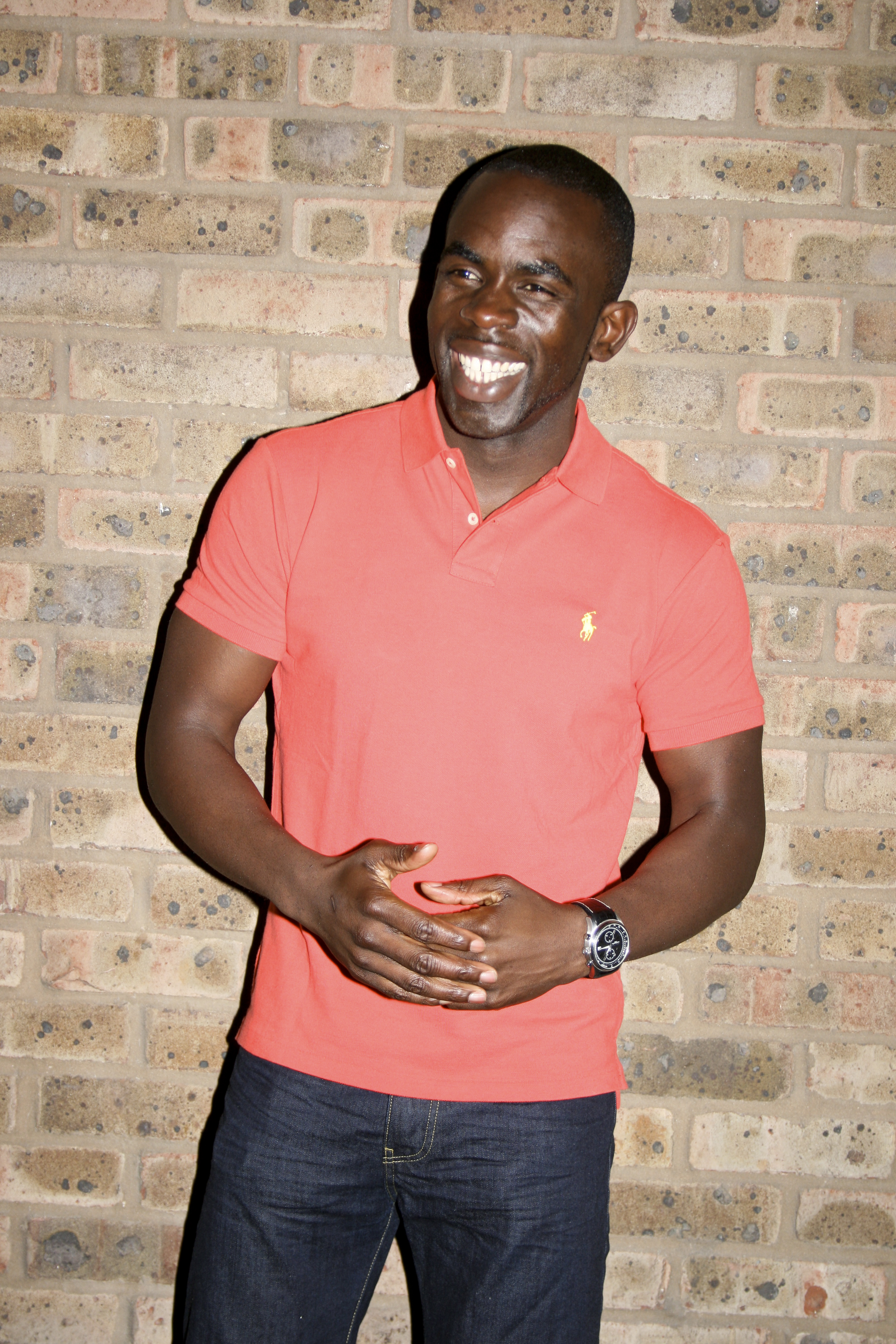
Jimmy Akingbola portrayed Antoine Malick.

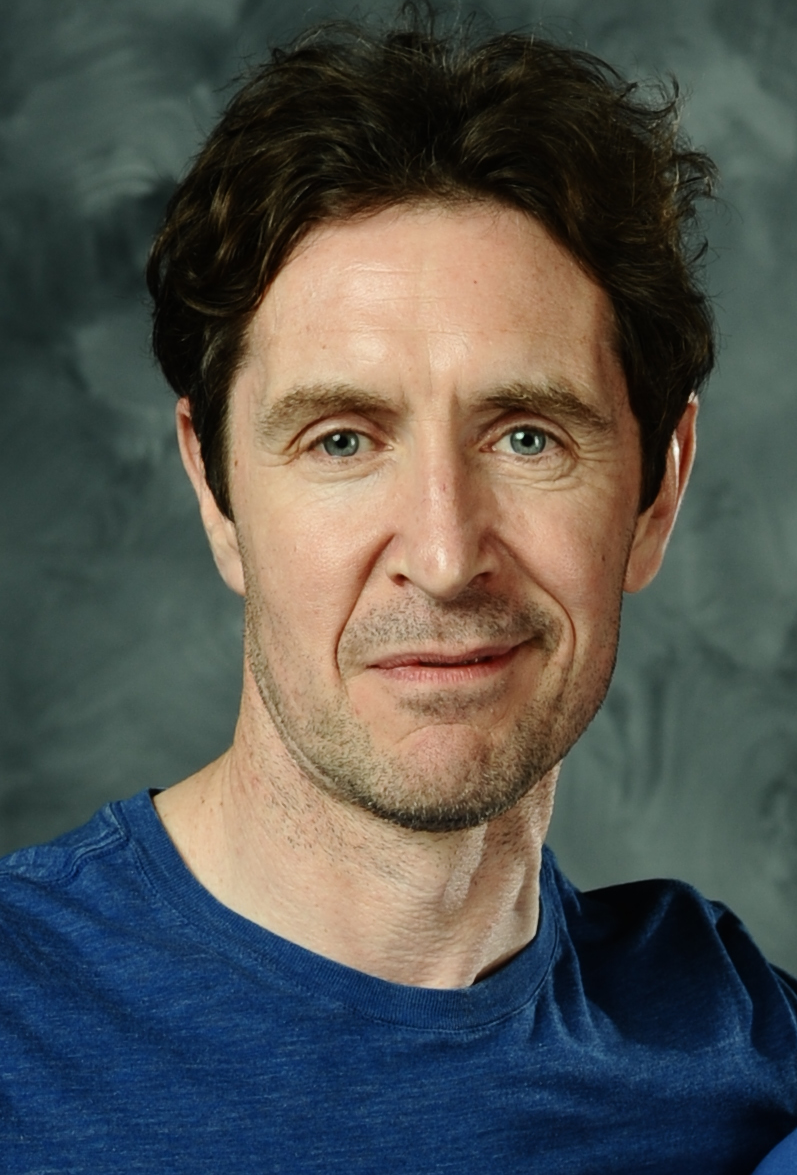
John Gaskell actor Paul McGann.

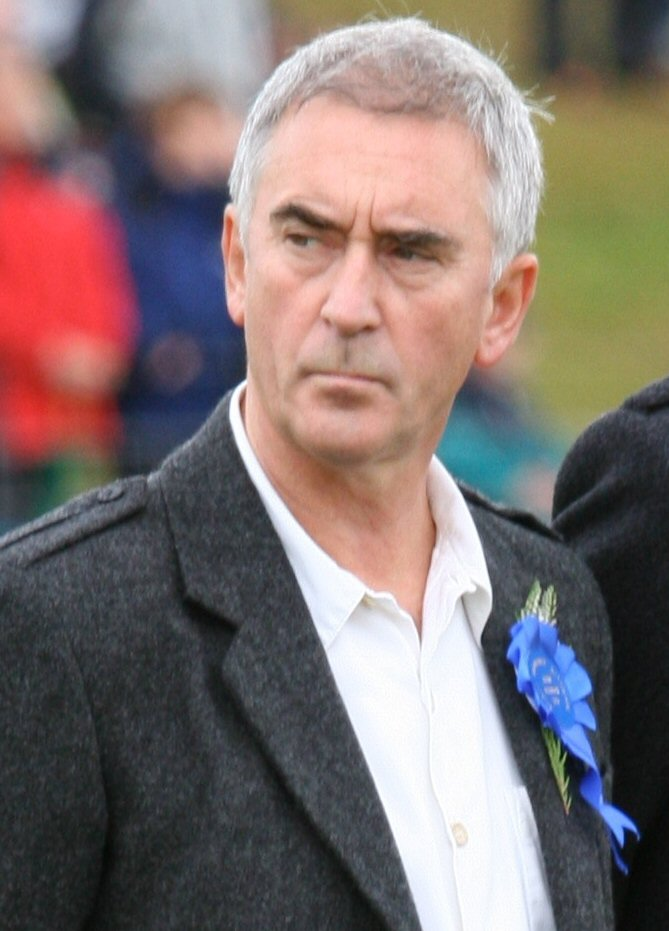
Denis Lawson starred as Tom Campbell-Gore.

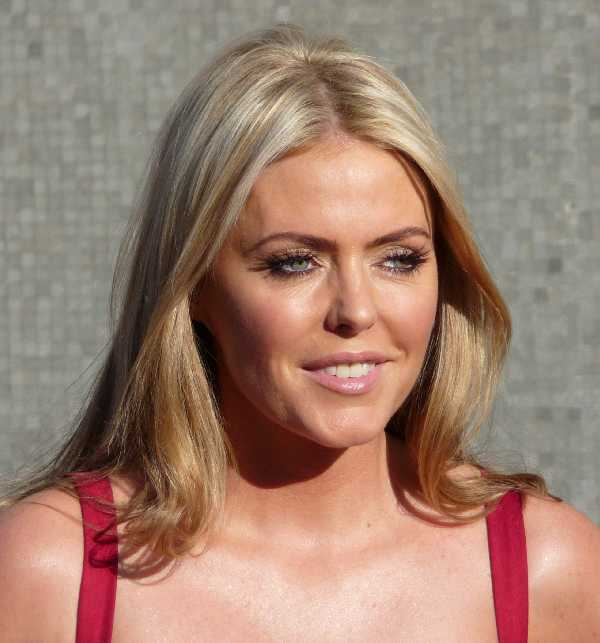
Patsy Kensit played Faye Morton.

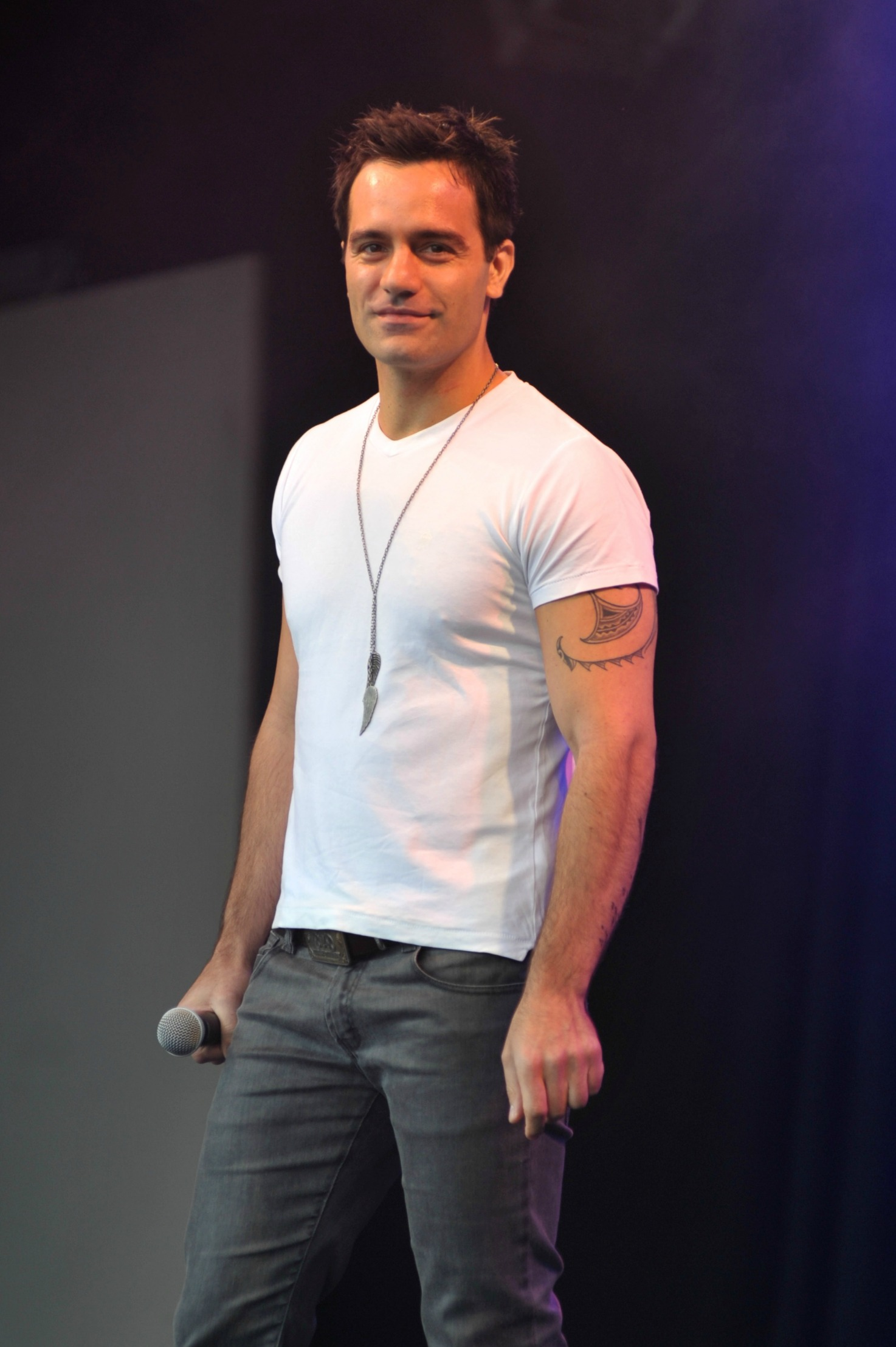
Ramin Karimloo features as Kian Madani.

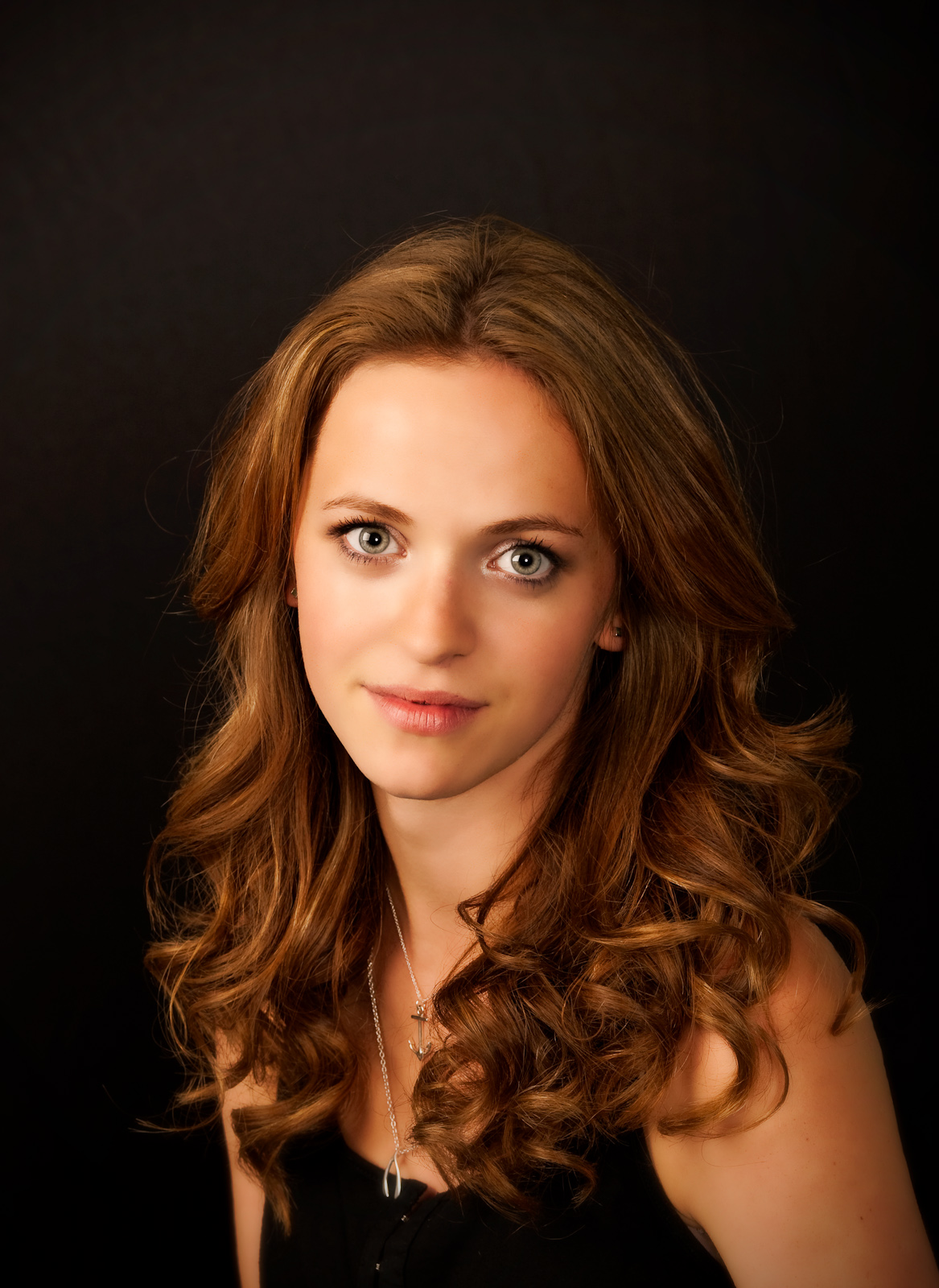
Lucinda Dryzek had a year-long stint as Jasmine Burrows.

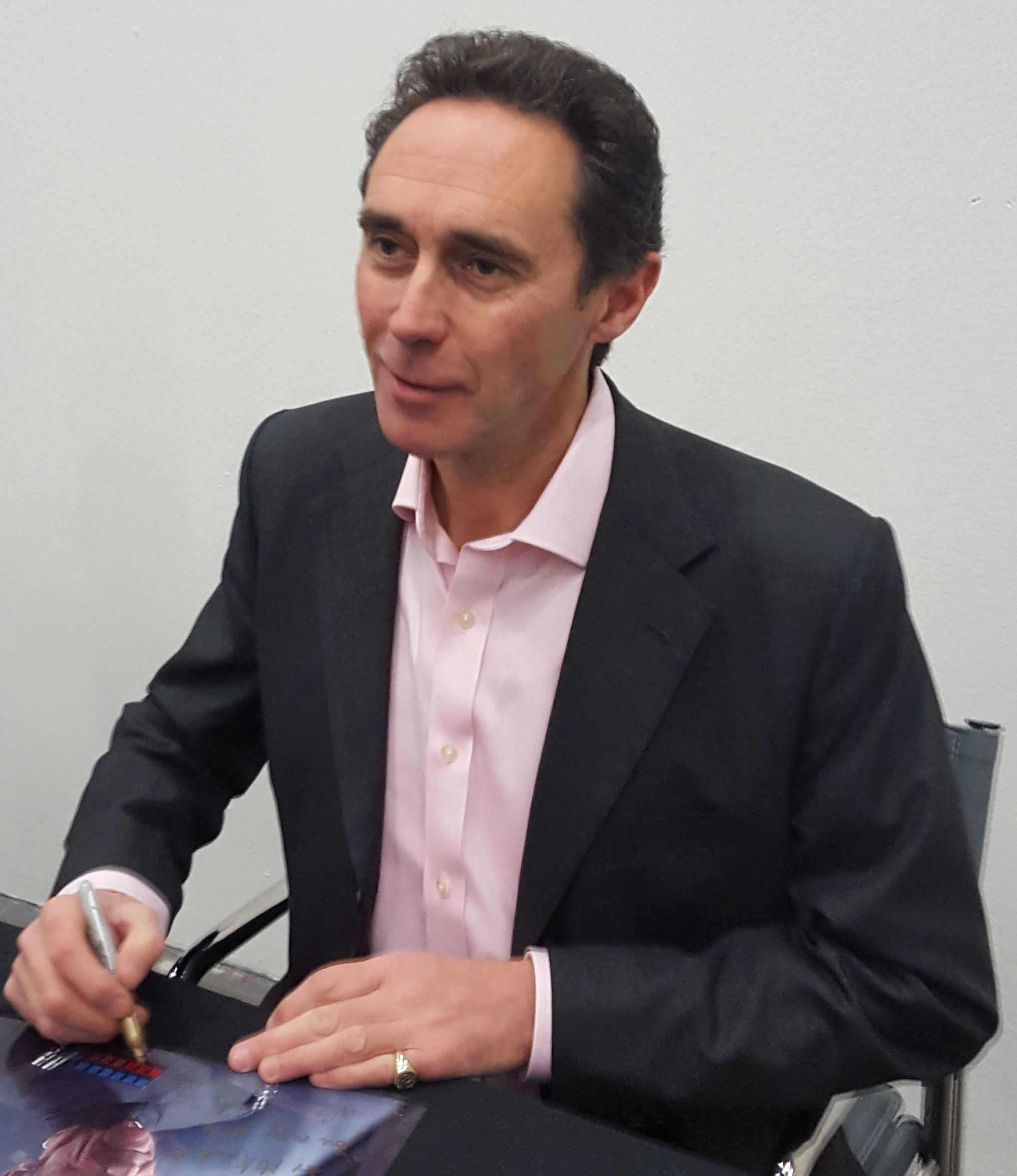
Guy Henry portrayed Henrik Hanssen.

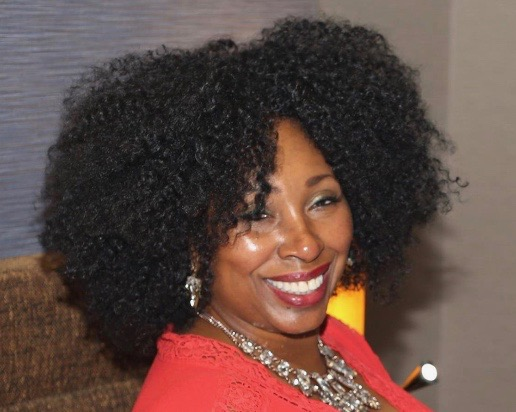
Jo Martin appeared as Max McGerry.

Character	Actor(s)	First appearance (Note: The original broadcast date of the character's first appearance.)	Last appearance (Note: The original broadcast date of the character's last appearance.)	Ref(s)
Muriel McKendrick	Phyllis Logan	19 January 1999	9 March 1999	
Karen Newburn	Sarah Preston	19 January 1999	9 March 2000	
Ray Sykes	Ian Curtis	12 January 1999	9 March 2000	
Kirstie Collins	Dawn McDaniel	12 January 1999	23 November 2000	
Victoria Merrick	Lisa Faulkner	19 January 1999	8 May 2001	
Julie Fitzjohn	Nicola Stephenson	12 January 1999	29 May 2001	
Mike Barratt	Clive Mantle	25 November 1999	5 June 2001	
Jasmine Hopkins	Angela Griffin	12 January 1999	5 June 2001	
Liam Evans	Adrian Lewis Morgan	13 February 2001	4 June 2002	
Tash Bandara	Thusitha Jayasundera	23 December 1999	18 June 2002	
Keri McGrath	Anna Mountford	12 October 2000	16 July 2002	
Janice Taylor	Siobhan Redmond	12 October 2000	6 August 2002	
Sam Kennedy	Colette Brown	20 March 2001	13 August 2002	
Anton Meyer	George Irving	12 January 1999	20 August 2002	
Danny Shaughnessy	Jeremy Edwards	25 November 1999	25 March 2003	
Ben Saunders	David Paisley	29 January 2002	22 April 2003	
Steve Waring	Peter de Jersey	12 October 2000	6 May 2003	
Alex Adams	Jeremy Sheffield	5 October 2000	6 August 2003	
Sandy Harper	Laura Sadler	5 October 2000	2 September 2003	
Stan Ashleigh	Paul Shane	16 November 2000	13 October 2003	
Kath Fox	Jan Pearson	6 June 1999	30 March 2004	
Ed Keating	Rocky Marshall	13 August 2002	18 May 2004	
Alistair Taylor	Dominic Jephcott	13 February 2001	28 December 2004	
Rosie Sattar	Kim Vithana	13 May 2003	11 January 2005	
Will Curtis	Noah Huntley	20 April 2004	5 April 2005	
Lisa Fox	Luisa Bradshaw-White	31 December 2001	13 September 2005	
Zubin Khan	Art Malik	17 June 2003	4 October 2005	
Mubbs Hussein	Ian Aspinall	27 November 2001	11 October 2005	
Owen Davis	Mark Moraghan	23 October 2001	20 December 2005	
Mickie Hendrie	Kelly Adams	16 March 2004	12 September 2006	
Tricia Williams	Sharon Maughan	8 April 2003	21 November 2006	
Matt Parker	Adam Best	3 May 2005	28 March 2007	
Dean West	Paul Henshall	3 May 2005	28 March 2007	
Stuart McElroy	Conor Mullen	6 November 2007	12 February 2008	
Abra Durant	Ade Edmondson	5 July 2005	9 December 2008	
Kyla Tyson	Rakie Ayola	7 February 2006	9 December 2008	
Sam Strachan	Tom Chambers	3 January 2006	22 December 2008	
Dan Clifford	Peter Wingfield	28 November 2006	26 May 2009	
Maddy Young	Nadine Lewington	16 January 2007	26 May 2009	
Jayne Grayson	Stella Gonet	10 July 2007	1 September 2009	
Nick Jordan	Michael French	12 January 1999	15 February 2010	
Daisha Anderson	Rebecca Grant	18 March 2008	22 March 2010	
Maria Kendall	Phoebe Thomas	28 November 2006	19 May 2010	
Linden Cullen	Duncan Pow	15 January 2008	12 October 2010	
Mark Williams	Robert Powell	15 February 2005	25 January 2011	
Penny Valentine	Emma Catherwood	9 June 2009	12 April 2011	
Elizabeth Tait	La Charné Jolly	24 May 2010	25 October 2011	
Greg Douglas	Edward MacLiam	17 February 2010	1 May 2012	
Dan Hamilton	Adam Astill	15 February 2011	10 July 2012	
Eddi McKee	Sarah-Jane Potts	7 June 2011	23 October 2012	
Luc Hemingway	Joseph Millson	8 November 2011	8 January 2013	
Tara Lo	Jing Lusi	5 March 2012	16 April 2013	
Chrissie Williams	Tina Hobley	5 June 2001	19 November 2013	
Gemma Wilde	Ty Glaser	22 January 2013	17 December 2013	
Edward Campbell	Aden Gillett	30 July 2013	7 January 2014	
Jess Griffin	Verona Joseph	15 January 2002	18 March 2014	
Colette Sheward	Louise Delamere	3 December 2013	4 November 2014	
Mary-Claire Carter	Niamh McGrady	29 September 2009	14 April 2015	
Harry Tressler	Jules Knight	14 May 2013	14 April 2015	
Jonny Maconie	Michael Thomson	15 May 2012	23 June 2015	
Adele Effanga	Petra Letang	14 January 2014	29 March 2016	
Jesse Law	Don Gilet	22 April 2014	12 April 2016	
Chantelle Lane	Lauren Drummond	7 June 2011	7 June 2016	
Antoine Malick	Jimmy Akingbola	4 January 2011	7 June 2016	
Cara Martinez	Niamh Walsh	16 June 2015	23 June 2016	
Damon Ford	David Ajao	6 June 2017	21 November 2017	
Nina Karnik	Ayesha Dharker	9 May 2017	28 November 2017	
Matteo Rossini	Christian Vit	29 November 2016	28 November 2017	
Morven Digby	Eleanor Fanyinka	30 June 2015	19 December 2017	
Roxanna MacMillan	Hermione Gulliford	2 April 2013	25 September 2018	
John Gaskell	Paul McGann	5 December 2017	20 November 2018	
Meena Chowdhury	Salma Hoque	12 December 2017	27 November 2018	
Tom Campbell-Gore	Denis Lawson	13 August 2002	15 January 2019	
Lola Griffin	Sharon D. Clarke	7 June 2005	15 January 2019	
Connie Beauchamp	Amanda Mealing	1 June 2004	5 March 2019	
Frieda Petrenko	Olga Fedori	17 February 2010	26 March 2019	
Faye Morton	Patsy Kensit	30 January 2007	3 September 2019	
Diane Lloyd	Patricia Potter	2 July 2002	22 October 2019	
Lofty Chiltern	Lee Mead	16 May 2017	17 December 2019	
Xavier "Zav" Duval	Marcus Griffiths	20 February 2018	14 April 2020	
Raf di Lucca	Joe McFadden	28 January 2014	21 July 2020	
Skylar Bryce	Phoebe Pryce	10 November 2020	9 March 2021	
Sahira Shah	Laila Rouass	15 February 2011	4 May 2021	
Kian Madani	Ramin Karimloo	23 April 2019	22 June 2021	
Chloe Godard	Amy Lennox	29 January 2019	14 September 2021	
Cameron Dunn	Nic Jackman	4 August 2016	14 September 2021	
Jeni Sinclair	Debra Stephenson	27 April 2021	28 September 2021	
Lucky Simpson	Vineeta Rishi	24 November 2020	16 November 2021	
Zosia March	Camilla Arfwedson	10 September 2013	14 December 2021	
Oliver Valentine	James Anderson	9 June 2009	14 December 2021	
Michael Spence	Hari Dhillon	20 November 2007	28 February 2022	
Guy Self	John Michie	26 November 2013	8 March 2022	
Essie Harrison	Kaye Wragg	6 May 2014	15 March 2022	
Arthur Digby	Rob Ostlere	2 January 2013	15 March 2022	
Jasmine Burrows	Lucinda Dryzek	25 April 2010	15 March 2022	
Max McGerry	Jo Martin	15 October 2019	29 March 2022	
Mo Effanga	Chizzy Akudolu	22 May 2012	29 March 2022	
Elliot Hope	Paul Bradley	8 November 2005	29 March 2022	
Jac Naylor	Rosie Marcel	22 November 2005	29 March 2022	
Joseph Byrne	Luke Roberts	3 January 2006	29 March 2022	
Ric Griffin	Hugh Quarshie	9 October 2001	29 March 2022	
Serena Campbell	Catherine Russell	1 May 2012	29 March 2022	
Bernie Wolfe	Jemma Redgrave	2 February 2016	29 March 2022	
Russell "Russ" Faber	Simon Slater	12 October 2021	29 March 2022	
Henrik Hanssen	Guy Henry	19 October 2010	29 March 2022	
Jeong-Soo Han	Chan Woo Lim	10 November 2020	29 March 2022	
Dominic Copeland	David Ames	23 April 2013	29 March 2022	
Louis McGerry	Tyler Luke Cunningham	31 March 2020	29 March 2022	
Eli Ebrahimi	Davood Ghadami	27 July 2021	29 March 2022	
Kylie Maddon	Amy Murphy	10 February 2021	29 March 2022	
Donna Jackson	Jaye Jacobs	16 March 2004	29 March 2022	
Nicky McKendrick	Belinda Owusu	12 December 2017	29 March 2022	
Sacha Levy	Bob Barrett	5 January 2010	29 March 2022	
Josh Hudson	Trieve Blackwood-Cambridge	10 November 2020	29 March 2022	
Ange Godard	Dawn Steele	8 January 2019	29 March 2022	
Adrian "Fletch" Fletcher	Alex Walkinshaw	12 August 2014	29 March 2022	
Madge Britton	Clare Burt	27 July 2021	29 March 2022	

== Recurring characters ==
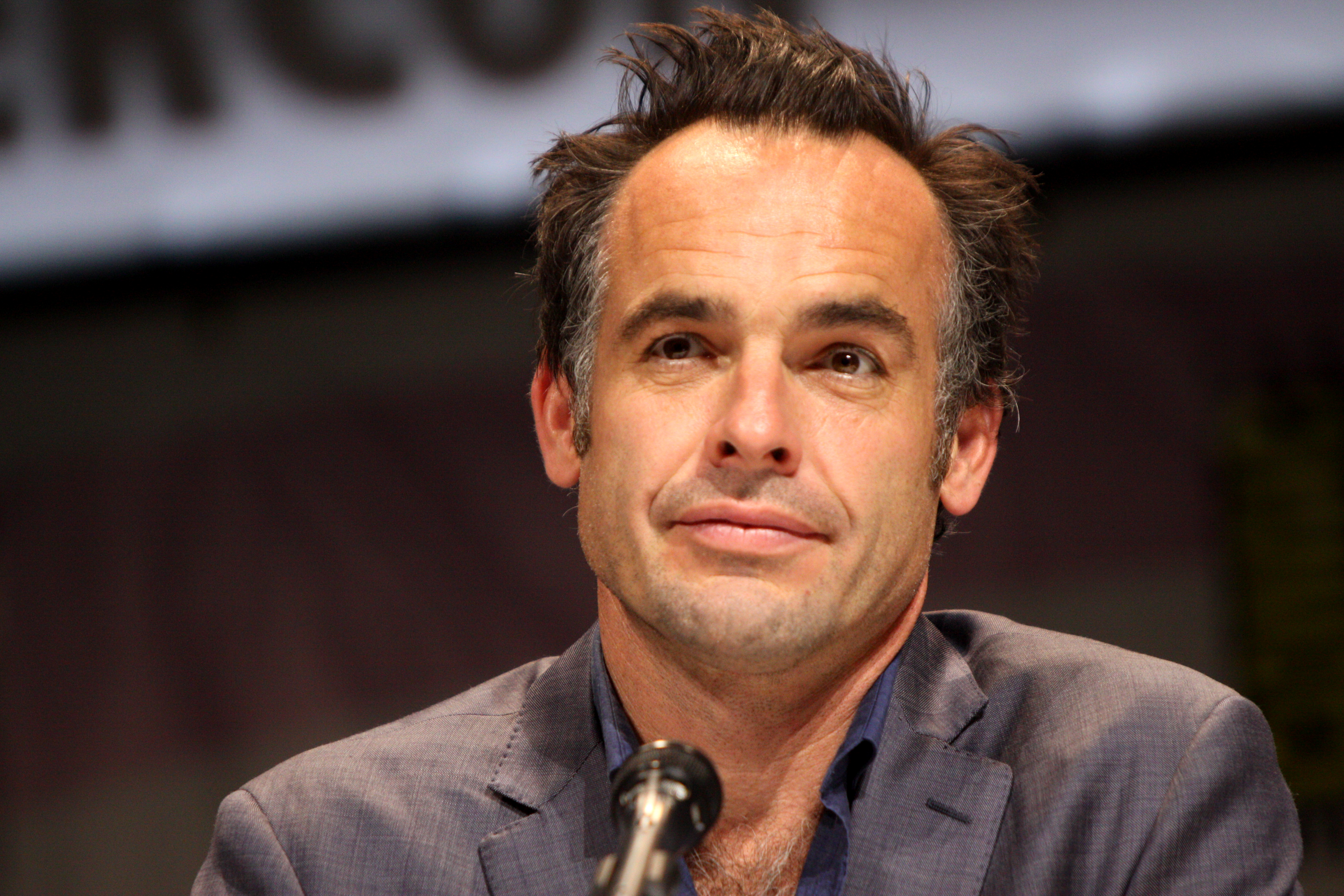
Paul Blackthorne appeared in series 3 as Guy Morton.

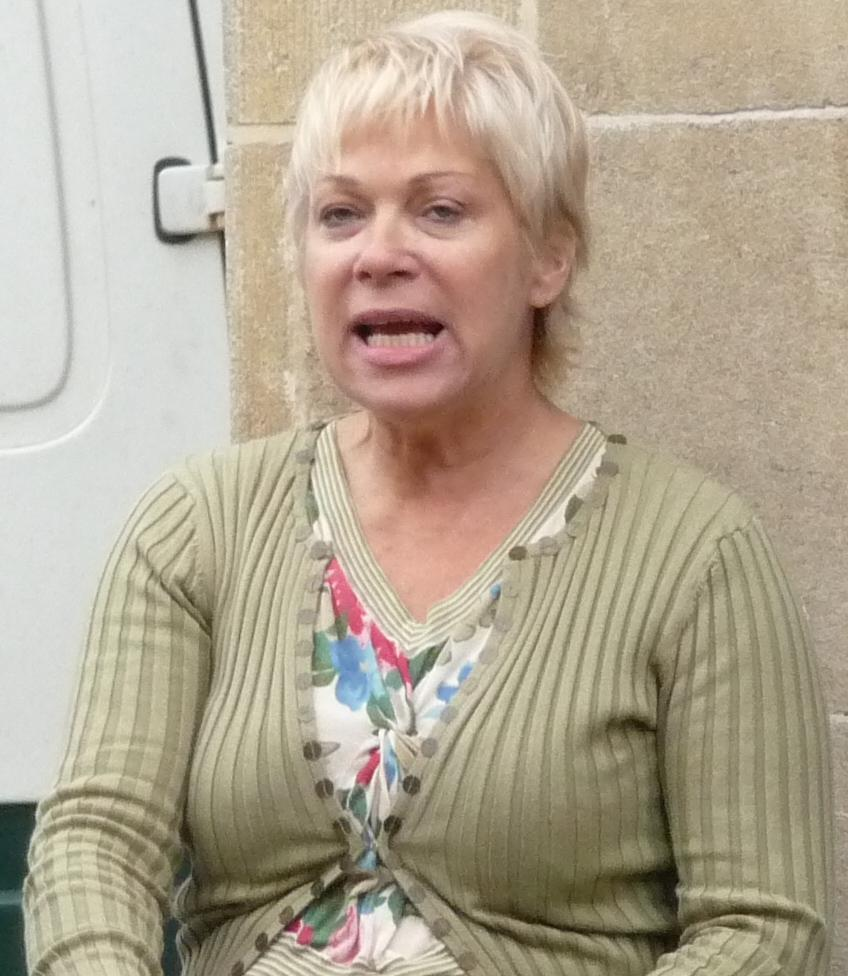
Denise Welch guest starred as Pam McGrath.

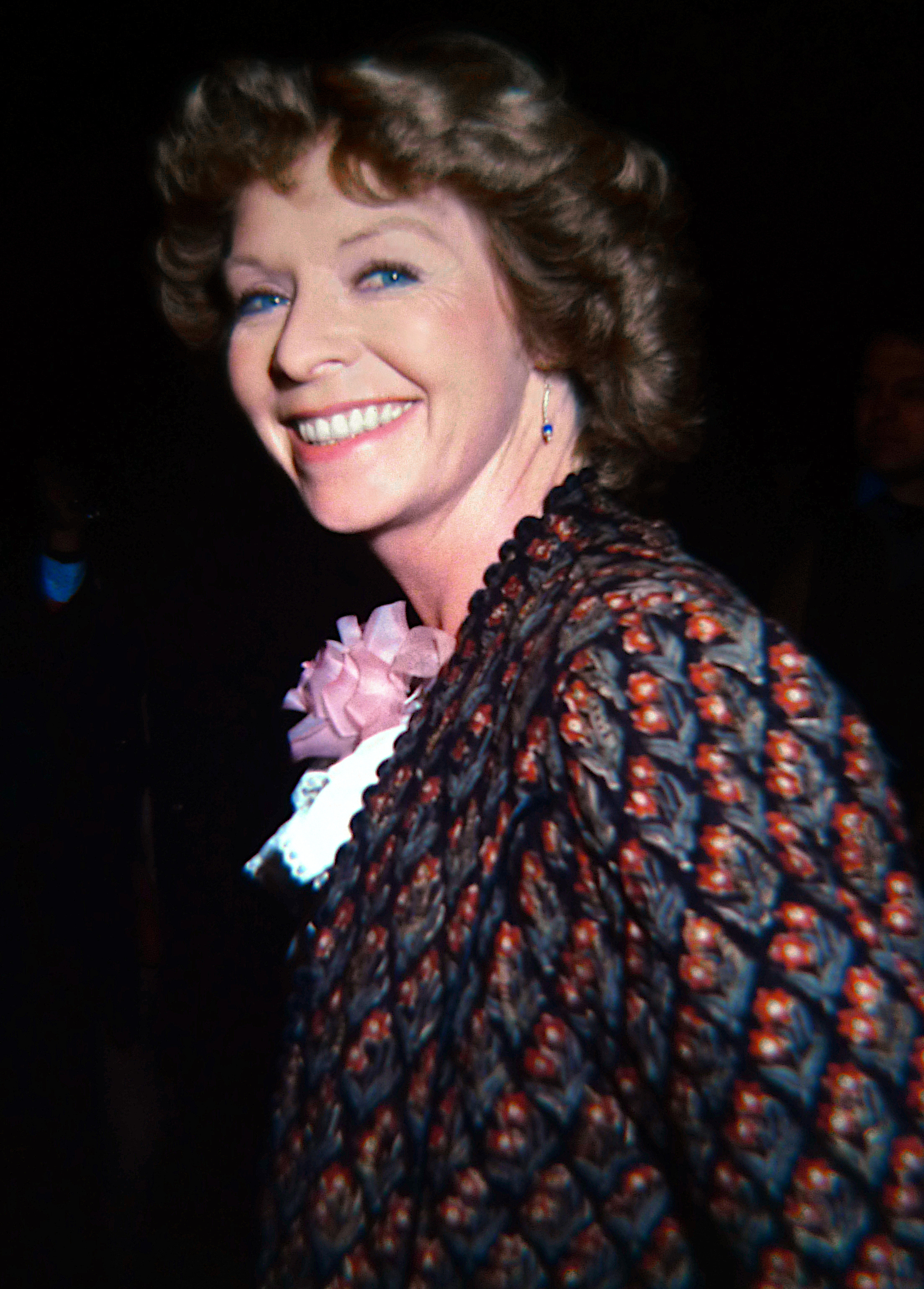
Susannah York portrayed Helen Grant.

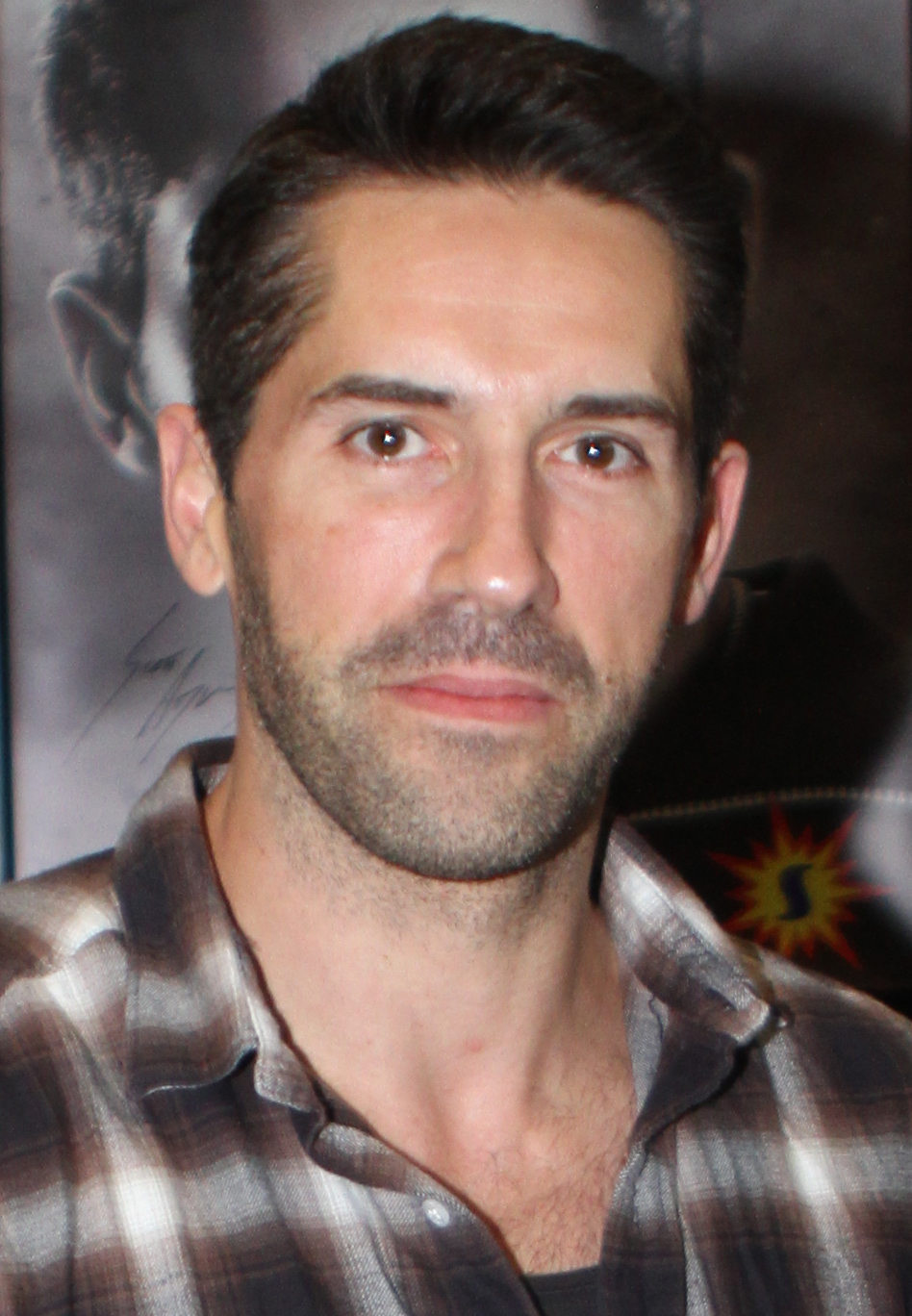
Bradley Hume actor Scott Adkins.

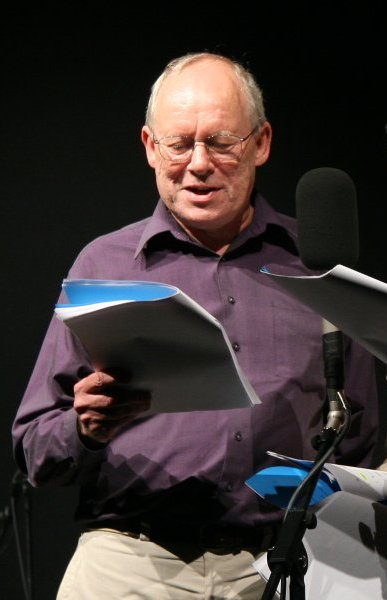
Graeme Garden played Ed Loftwood across four years.

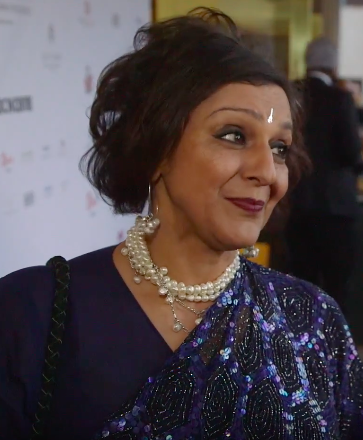
In series 11, Meera Syal features as Tara Sodi.

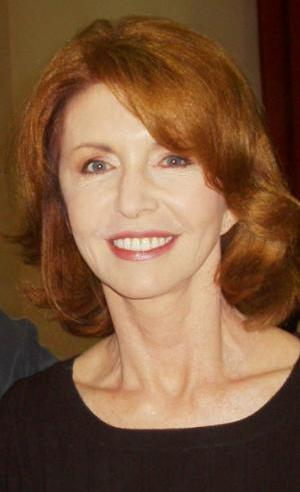
Anne-Marie, Lady Byrne actress Jane Asher.

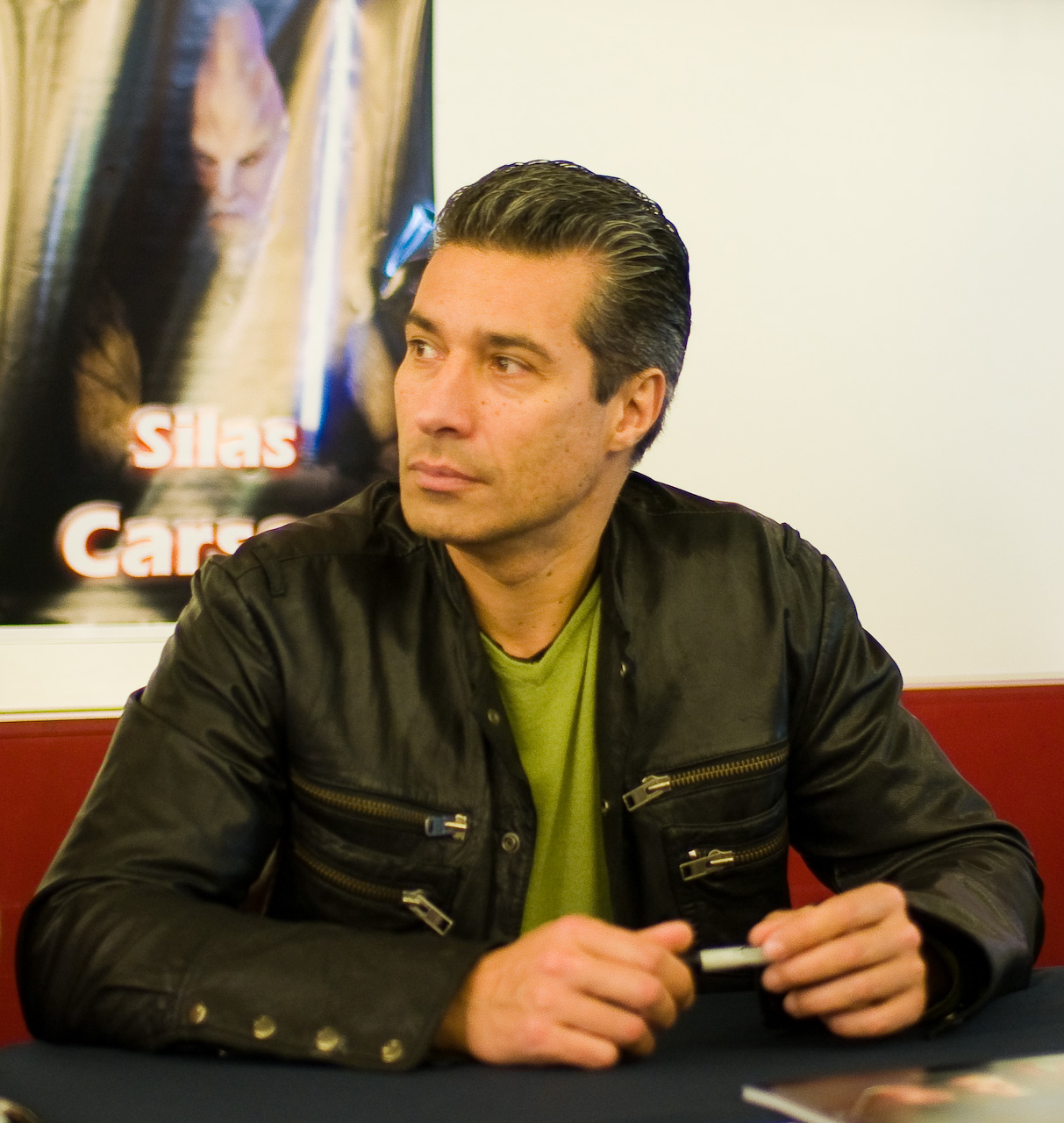
Silas Carson starred as Sunil Bhatti.

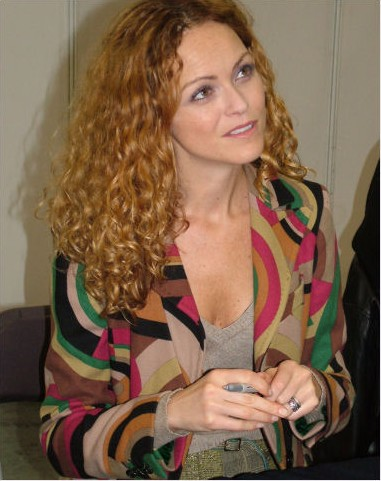
Anna-Louise Plowman appeared as Annalese Carson.

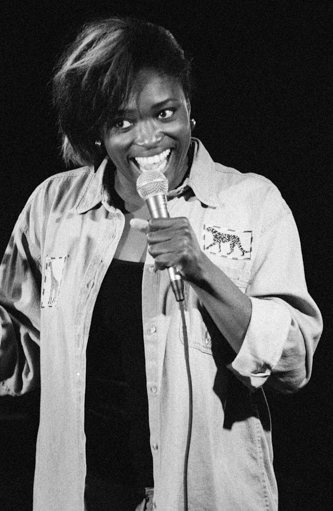
Andi Osho guest starred as Barbara Alcock.

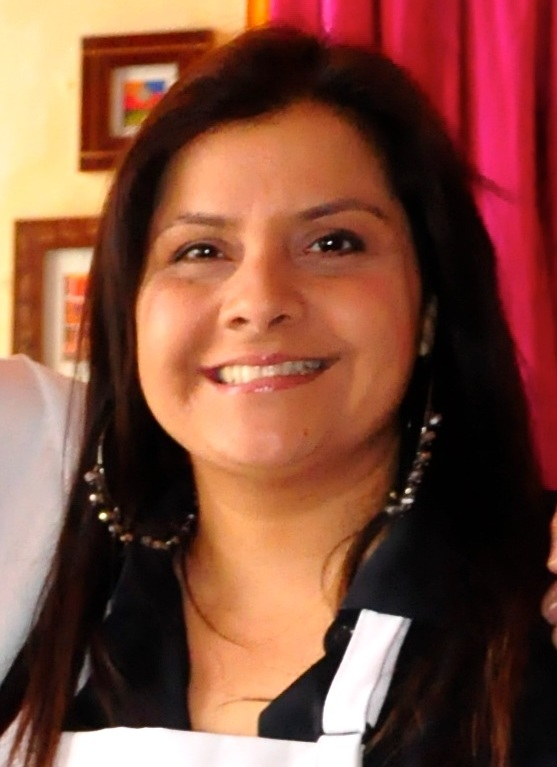
Nina Wadia appeared in a month-long stint as Annabelle Cooper.

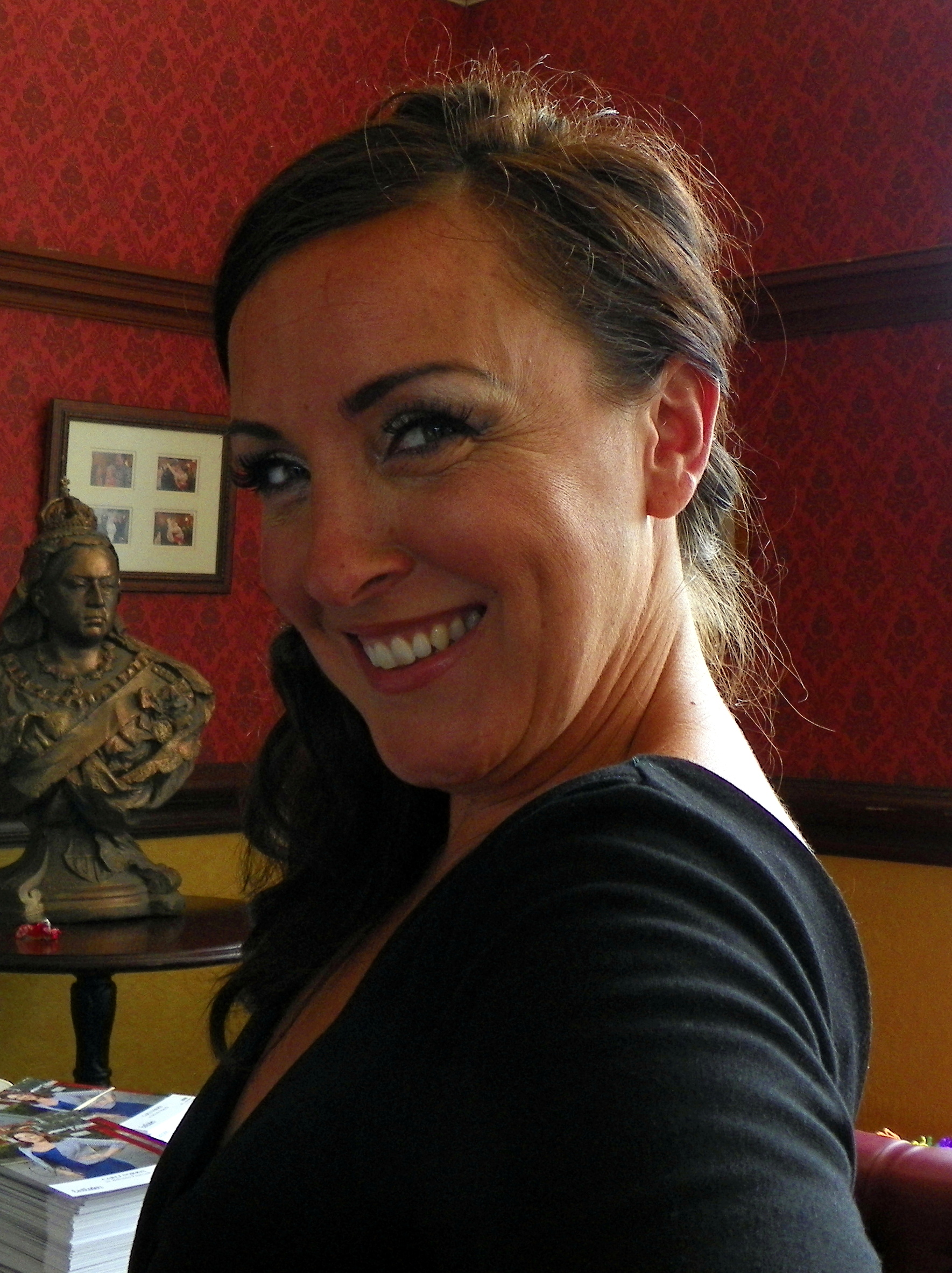
Carli Norris has appeared in stints as Fran Reynolds.

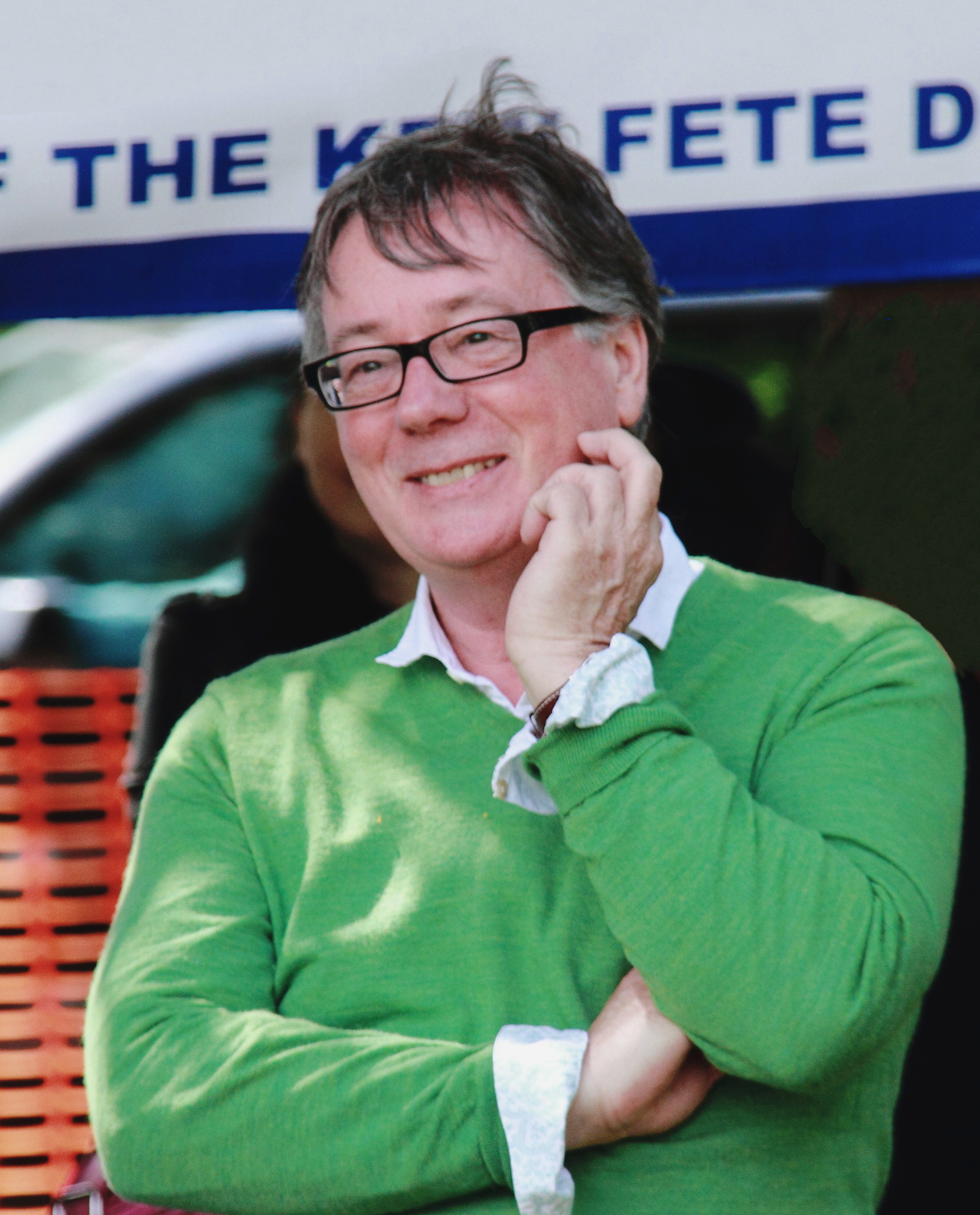
Jeff Rawle guest starred as Jerry Clark.

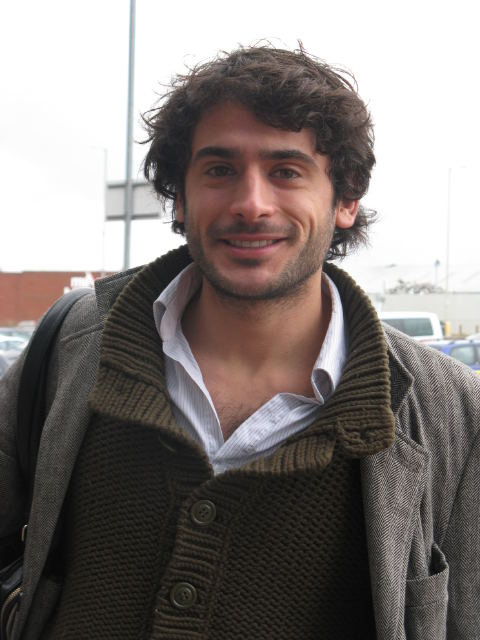
Marc Elliott played Isaac Mayfield.

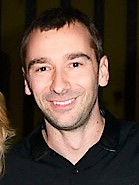
Charlie Condou appeared as Ben Sherwood.

Character	Actor(s)	First appearance	Last appearance	Ref(s)
Paul Ripley	Luke Mably	12 January 1999	26 January 1999	
Peter Ellis	Fraser James	12 January 1999	16 February 1999	
Ellie Sharpe	Julie Saunders	12 January 1999	9 March 1999	
Damien Wetherell	Matt Dempsey	16 December 1999	27 January 2000	
Guy Morton	Paul Blackthorne	6 March 2001	5 June 2001	
Pam McGrath	Denise Welch	11 June 2002	16 July 2002	
Anil Banerjee	Kulvinder Ghir	16 November 2000	22 October 2002	
Jan Goddard	Judy Loe	6 August 2002	4 February 2003	
Sunil Gupta	Hari Dhillon	8 May 2001	15 July 2003	
Sir Charles Merrick	Simon Williams	12 February 2003	15 July 2003	
Anita Forbes	Kirsty Mitchell	25 March 2003	29 July 2003	
Helen Grant	Susannah York	6 August 2003	25 November 2003	
Nic Yorke	Liam Garrigan	10 June 2003	30 December 2003	
Kelly Yorke	Rachel Leskovac	1 July 2003	27 January 2004	
Anna Chandler	Deborah Poplett	27 February 2001	7 December 2004	
Carlos Fashola	David Bedella	27 July 2004	2 August 2005	
Sean Thompson	Chinna Wodu	23 November 2004	10 August 2005	
Andy Fishman	Ace Bhatti	30 August 2005	6 December 2005	
Justin Fuller	Ben Richards	21 March 2006	11 July 2006	
Dr Charles	Victoria Pritchard	25 March 2003	18 July 2006	
Michael Beauchamp	Anthony Calf	19 April 2005	8 August 2006	
Bradley Hume	Scott Adkins	23 May 2006	17 October 2006	
Reg Lund	Martin Hancock	28 June 2005	17 October 2006	
Sanghita Parma	Mia Soteriou	31 October 2006	28 March 2007	
Alan Dane	Peter Hamilton Dyer	9 January 2007	1 May 2007	
Ooma Chowdry	Sakuntala Ramanee	10 May 2007	24 May 2007	
Christopher Sutherland	Patrick Toomey	4 April 2006	28 June 2007	
Ed Loftwood	Graeme Garden	18 February 2003	10 July 2007	
Charles, Lord Byrne	Ronald Pickup	3 January 2006	31 July 2007	
Emma Jackson	Celia Henebury	23 July 2002	2 October 2007	
Zoe Foxe	Alicia Davies	30 October 2007	19 December 2007	
Gina Hope	Gillian Bevan	21 March 2006	27 December 2007	
James Crowe	William Mannering	9 September 2008	1 October 2008	
Jamie Norton	Dominic Colchester	1 July 2008	18 November 2008	
Toby Carr	Paul Venables	20 January 2009	3 February 2009	
Tom O'Dowd	Jalaal Hartley	14 October 2008	21 April 2009	
Rachel Baptiste	Ayesha Antoine	18 November 2008	5 May 2009	
Martha Hope	Holly Lucas	11 April 2006	22 June 2009	
Tara Sodi	Meera Syal	22 June 2009	18 August 2009	
Lauren Minster	Riann Steele	2 June 2009	12 January 2010	
Thandie Abebe-Griffin	Ginny Holder	20 March 2007	22 February 2010	
George Kerwan	Joseph May	27 January 2010	22 February 2010	
Toby Geddes	Rick Warden	17 February 2010	9 March 2010	
Judith Marchant	Shelagh McLeod	20 October 2009	15 March 2010	
Vanessa Lytton	Leslie Ash	13 October 2009	6 April 2010	
Davina MacKenzie	Sarah Winman	11 November 2008	19 May 2010	
Paul Rose	Andrew Lewis	19 October 2000	7 June 2010	
Keith Greene	Alex Macqueen	10 May 2005	13 July 2010	
Nicky van Barr	Alan Morrissey	30 June 2009	26 October 2010	
Anne-Marie, Lady Byrne	Jane Asher	10 May 2007	28 December 2010	
Sarita Dubashi	Rakhee Thakrar	2 November 2010	8 February 2011	
Kieran Callaghan	Barry Sloane	16 November 2010	8 March 2011	
Lulu Hutchison	Fiona Hampton	19 July 2011	6 September 2011	
Sunil Bhatti	Silas Carson	19 April 2011	11 October 2011	
Sir Fraser Anderson	Aneirin Hughes	28 June 2011	18 October 2011	
Stephen Hopewell	Lex Shrapnel	6 September 2011	13 December 2011	
Lleucu Jones	Daisy Keeping	9 August 2011	27 March 2012	
Alex Broadhurst	Sasha Behar	7 February 2012	3 April 2012	
Rafi Raza	Zubin Varla	21 February 2012	17 April 2012	
Annalese Carson	Anna-Louise Plowman	4 November 2008	24 April 2012	
Barbara Alcock	Andi Osho	19 June 2012	3 July 2012	
Ella Barnes	Emma Hiddleston	1 May 2012	10 July 2012	
Simon Marshall	Paul Nicholls	22 May 2012	10 July 2012	
Max Schneider	John Light	7 August 2012	25 September 2012	
George Binns	Leander Deeny	14 August 2012	2 October 2012	
Albie Cheshire	Andrew Greenough	6 November 2012	11 December 2012	
Ramona Gomez	María Fernández-Ache	13 November 2012	18 December 2012	
Lilah Birdwood	Natasha Leigh	30 October 2012	2 January 2013	
Rhys Hopkins	Gareth David-Lloyd	30 October 2012	2 January 2013	
Terence Cunningham	Roger Barclay	28 July 2009	15 January 2013	
Sean Dolan	Wil Johnson	1 November 2011	22 January 2013	
Sharon Kozinsky	Madeleine Potter	30 April 2013	27 August 2013	
Jake Patterson	Louis Payne	22 January 2013	26 November 2013	
Jeremy Solis	Tom Beard	14 January 2014	28 January 2014	
Bonnie Wallis	Carlyss Peer	8 October 2013	1 April 2014	
Paula Burrows	Julie Legrand	30 March 2010	19 June 2014	
James Hope	Sam Stockman	22 August 2006	22 July 2014	
Adrienne McKinnie	Sandra Voe	12 February 2013	18 November 2014	
Amy Teo	Wendy Kweh	25 March 2014	16 December 2014	
Sophia Verlaine	Nina Toussaint-White	11 November 2014	23 December 2014	
Nathan Hargreave	Jotham Annan	2 January 2013	30 December 2014	
Sir Dennis Hopkins-Clark	Rupert Frazer	8 March 2016	12 April 2015	
Annabelle Cooper	Nina Wadia	21 April 2015	19 May 2015	
Angus Farrell	Jamie Glover	24 May 2011	2 June 2015	
Lucy Mottica	Lisa Marged	19 May 2015	18 August 2015	
Clifford George	Geff Francis	28 April 2015	1 September 2015	
Sebastian Coulter	Hadley Fraser	16 June 2015	15 September 2015	
Brigitte Nye	Sally Dexter	11 August 2015	22 September 2015	
Naomi Palmer	Lorna Brown	3 May 2016	5 July 2016	
Imelda Cousins	Tessa Peake-Jones	20 November 2012	25 October 2016	
Tristan Wood	Jonathan McGuinness	23 August 2016	15 November 2016	
Elinor Campbell	Amy McCallum	5 June 2012	3 January 2017	
Elinor Campbell	Charlotte Hope	5 June 2012	3 January 2017	
Inga Olsen	Kaisa Hammarlund	6 September 2016	3 January 2017	
Alex Lambert	Jack Hawkins	17 May 2016	7 March 2017	
Kyle Greenham	Alan Morrissey	23 September 2014	11 April 2017	
Fran Reynolds	Carli Norris	15 September 2015	11 July 2017	
Kim Whitfield	Louisa Clein	11 October 2016	10 October 2017	
Parker Whitfield	Louis Davison	18 October 2016	10 October 2017	
David Hopkins	Fraser James	14 November 2017	7 December 2017	
Fredrik Johansson	William Postlethwaite	5 September 2017	7 December 2017	
Jerry Clark	Jeff Rawle	8 January 2013	12 December 2017	
Jeremy Warren	Nick Rhys	10 October 2017	19 December 2017	
Abigail Tate	Olivia Poulet	3 April 2018	4 September 2018	
Mikey Fletcher	Kai O'Loughlin	3 May 2016	25 September 2018	
Sydney Somers	Gemma Oaten	11 April 2017	11 December 2018	
Sheilagh Chiltern	Wanda Ventham	23 January 2018	18 December 2018	
Leah Faulkner	Hannah Daniel	2 October 2018	18 December 2018	
Steven Fletcher	Jesse Birdsall	31 July 2018	27 December 2018	
Derwood Thompson	Ben Hull	3 July 2012	27 December 2018	
Greta Allinson	Zoe Croft	7 February 2018	2 January 2019	
Arianne Cornell	Sara Stewart	9 January 2018	2 January 2019	
Roman Makarenko	Marko Leht	24 April 2018	22 January 2019	
Kofi Johnstone	Richard Pepple	13 June 2017	19 March 2019	
Theo Fletcher	Stanley Rabbetts	29 August 2017	20 March 2019	
Amira Zafar	Poppy Jhakra	10 October 2017	20 March 2019	
Isaac Mayfield	Marc Elliott	23 June 2016	11 June 2019	
Patricia Ghraoui	Sirine Saba	29 May 2018	20 June 2019	
"Scary" Sue Buchanan	Angela Lonsdale	2 October 2018	9 July 2019	
Evan Crowhurst	Jack Ryder	20 March 2019	1 October 2019	
Darla Johnstone	Naomi Katiyo	25 April 2017	8 October 2019	
Fleur Fanshawe	Debbie Chazen	14 October 2014	19 November 2019	
Phoebe Palmer	Daisy Wood-Davis	2 April 2019	17 December 2019	
Ben Sherwood	Charlie Condou	19 December 2019	24 March 2020	
David Hide	Jason Durr	5 March 2019	7 April 2020	
Tracey McKendrick	Cathy Murphy	21 January 2020	14 July 2020	
Emma Naylor-Maconie	Darcey Burke	7 January 2014	28 July 2020	
Beka Levy	Francesca Barrett	19 April 2010	26 January 2021	
Beka Levy	Rhean McGee	19 April 2010	26 January 2021	
Michael Townsend	Elliot Levey	17 November 2020	2 February 2021	
Jodie Rodgers	Sian Reese-Williams	10 November 2020	16 February 2021	
Alex Duval	Miles Mitchell	9 October 2018	2 March 2021	
Alex Duval	Leemore Marrett Jr	9 October 2018	2 March 2021	
Reyhan Shah	Raad Rawi	2 March 2021	4 May 2021	
Andrei Tarpov	Sonny Poon Tip	6 April 2021	22 June 2021	
Ethan Hardy	George Rainsford	7 June 2016	14 September 2021	
Iain Dean	Michael Stevenson	30 August 2016	14 September 2021	
Rich Peterson	Richard Pepper	7 July 2021	14 September 2021	
Mia Barron	Briana Shann	27 October 2009	5 October 2021	
Mia Barron	Jada Wallace-Mitchell	27 October 2009	5 October 2021	
Elaine Hudson	Carol Walton	7 July 2021	19 October 2021	
Evie Fletcher	Phoebe French	20 January 2015	16 November 2021	
Evie Fletcher	Macey Chipping	20 January 2015	16 November 2021	
Carole Copeland	Julia Deakin	30 June 2015	7 December 2021	
Billie Faber	Delainey Hayles	2 November 2021	8 March 2022	
Amelia Ebrahimi	Lucy Briggs-Owen	28 September 2021	22 March 2022	
Jason Haynes	Jules Robertson	9 February 2016	29 March 2022	
Lexy Morrell	Jenny Howe	22 May 2012	29 March 2022	

== Bibliography ==
- Haasler, Sue (2018). Holby City: Behind the Screen. SilverWood Books Ltd. ISBN 978-1-78132-562-9.
- Cantrell, Tom; Hogg, Christopher (30 August 2017). Acting in British Television. Macmillan International Higher Education. ISBN 9781137470225.
