= National Lampoon's Barely Legal =

2003 film by David M. Evans

- DVD cover of National Lampoon's Barely Legal.
- Directed by: David Mickey Evans
- Written by: David H. Steinberg
- Produced by: Keetgi Kogan; Brad Krevoy; Klaus Rettig
- Starring: Erik von Detten; Tony Denman; Daniel Farber; Sarah-Jane Potts; Amy Smart; Tom Arnold; Riley Smith; Cameron Richardson
- Cinematography: John B. Aronson
- Edited by: Harry Keramidas
- Music by: Andrew Gross
- Distributed by: Barely Legal Productions LLC
- Release date: 2003
- Running time: 90 minutes
- Country: United States
- Language: English
- Box office: $83,439

National Lampoon's Barely Legal is a 2003 American comedy film about three male high school students who decide to make money by selling pornographic videos, in the hopes of gaining both women and standing among their peers. The film was also known as After School Special.

== Plot ==
Matt, Fred, and Deacon are three high school teenagers who are obsessed with sex, but unable to obtain it. Frustrated at being restricted to fantasy and voyeurism, they decide to film a pornographic movie, in order to gain access to women, money and social standing. Fred steals credit card records from one of his father's patients, and posing as adults, they purchase a web hosting service for After School Special – a site "by virgins, for virgins". Masquerading as Hawaiians vacationing in Cleveland, they cast local strippers.

Jake, their popular classmate and Deacon's neighbor, learns of their plan, and blackmails the trio to cast him in their film. However, Jake has difficulty performing on cue. The female lead, Ashley, agrees to help and casually gives him a handjob, but Jake experiences premature ejaculation, gets upset and confiscates the film. He is eventually replaced with Coop, an older student.

Meanwhile, Deacon finds the courage to talk to the popular Naomi during a party. In a subsequent party, Jake, whom Naomi recently dumped, tries to humiliate Deacon in front of her, but this act only draws the sympathetic Naomi closer to Deacon.

A fire during the filming sends everyone – including a topless Ashley – out of Deacon's basement and right into the kitchen where his family is. Deacon tells them Ashley is his girlfriend. To his surprise, Ashley agrees to stay for dinner. Naomi soon arrives and introduces herself as Deacon's girlfriend. She leaves upon meeting Deacon's "other girlfriend", but Deacon then tells Naomi the truth. She asks to be added to his film crew as a consultant on the female perspective. She thinks the purposely nerdy character of Coop should be well dressed and perhaps a foreign exchange student. This causes a rift with Matt and Fred, a conflict that causes Ashley to leave.

Naomi takes Deacon shopping for more appealing clothes and says he does not need "those boys" anymore. Despite this, Deacon apologizes to Matt and Fred. They consider halting production, but Ashley insists she needs the film in order to have a reel, and convinces them to resume production.

After completing the filming, the guys decide to quit making porn. At a party, Ashley says the reel she now has, gave her and Coop a contract proposal. Deacon gently breaks up with Naomi. An angry Jake then says he mailed his scene to Deacon's parents. Vic Ramalot, a local porn producer, kidnaps Deacon and his friends as he thinks they are hurting his business. To avoid bodily harm, they promise to hand over everything on the condition that they receive a lifetime supply of porn and that the youthful spirit of After School Special is retained.

The tape is stolen by Deacon's brother, who blackmails Deacon for it. At school, Fred and Matt lament that they still do not have money, power nor women. Deacon reunites with his ex-girlfriend Rachael. Two attractive girls hit on Fred and Matt due to their new rumored sexual knowledge. Jake refuses to stop humiliating Deacon and therefore has his embarrassing scene played over the school's monitors. The local porn producer/actor compensates them with convertibles. The closing scene shows Deacon's parents in bed, watching the porno that the boys had made. As the character played by Coop moves his head, Deacon's father sees a picture of their family and exclaims, "Is that our basement?"

== Cast ==
- Erik von Detten as Deacon Lewis
- Tony Denman as Fred
- Daniel Farber as Matt
- Sarah-Jane Potts as Ashley
- Amy Smart as Naomi
- Tom Arnold as Mr. Lewis
- Dey Young as Mrs. Lewis
- Riley Smith as Jake
- Vince Vieluf as Tom "Coop" Cooperman
- Samm Levine as Roger
- Cameron Richardson as Rachael
- Horatio Sanz as Vic Ramalot
- Lin Shaye as Tequila
- C. Ernst Harth as Magazine Man

== Reception ==
Robert Koehler of Variety magazine said that the film "lacks even the urge to find a sparkling angle on an overdone subgenre" and it "contains zero insight and even fewer memorable visual jokes, hardly pushing the needle on outrageous humor."
