= Eddi McKee =

- Holby City character
- Sarah-Jane Potts as Eddi McKee
- First appearance: "Rescue Me"; 7 June 2011
- Last appearance: "Chasing Demons"; 23 October 2012
- Portrayed by: Sarah-Jane Potts

In-universe information
- Occupation: Senior Staff Nurse
- Family: Liam McKee (brother)
- Significant other: Luc Hemingway

Eddi McKee is a fictional character from the BBC medical drama Holby City, played by actress Sarah-Jane Potts. She first appeared in the thirteenth series episode "Rescue Me", broadcast on 7 June 2011. Eddi was a Senior Nurse at Holby City Hospital. She was introduced along with fellow nurse Chantelle Lane (Lauren Drummond) by the show's then executive producer, Johnathan Young. Potts was approached by the Holby City casting director for the role. She loved the character breakdown and filmed her own audition to send to the casting director. Potts was offered the role on the strength of her audition and she signed a yearlong contract.

Eddi is portrayed as being straight-talking, no-nonsense, loyal and compassionate. Eddi believed the nurses did the most important job in the hospital and she had very forthright opinions. Exploration of the character's backstory began when her younger brother, Liam (Luke Tittensor), was introduced and it was revealed that Eddi had run away from home to escape their alcoholic mother. Potts pointed out that Eddi herself liked to drink to deal with her many issues. The character had a relationship with Luc Hemingway (Joseph Millson), which proved popular with viewers. Eddi also became involved with locum consultant Max Schneider (John Light) and developed an addiction to painkillers. Eddi departed on 23 October 2012, after Potts left the role. Her departure was not announced prior to the episode's airing, in order to surprise viewers.

== Creation and casting ==
On 14 May 2011, Daniel Kilkelly from Digital Spy announced that actresses Sarah-Jane Potts and Lauren Drummond had joined the cast of Holby City as new regular nurses Eddi McKee and Chantelle Lane respectively. Kilkelly reported the actresses would make their debuts during Holby City's thirteenth series in June 2011. Of the new characters, the show's then executive producer, Johnathan Young, commented "We're delighted to welcome Sarah Jane and Lauren to Holby City. They've brought a new dynamic to the team with two very different characters in the formidable Eddi and the vivacious Chantelle. We have some fantastic storylines ready for them and I'm excited to see what lies ahead."

Potts was in the United States when she was approached by the Holby City casting director about the role of Eddi. After reading the character breakdown, Potts loved the idea of Eddi so much that she filmed her own audition and sent the tape over to the casting director. She was then offered the role on the strength of her audition and signed a yearlong contract. Potts admitted that she had previously shied away from long-term roles, but she had no hesitations about signing up to play Eddi. She added that her first week on set was a shock due to the number of scenes they film in a day, but she thought it was good training. Potts made her first screen appearance as Eddi during the episode broadcast on 7 June 2011.

== Development ==
=== Introduction and characterisation ===
This sassy, no-nonsense tomboy rarely wears make-up and claims not to care what other people think about her – but might Eddi be hiding a vulnerable, compassionate side behind her cynical, ironic sense of humour? Eddi believes in rigidly maintaining professional and personal boundaries; at work, she's a strict but fair boss who never gets too attached to her patients, but when Eddi takes off her uniform and lets her hair down, she really lets her hair down.

— BBC Online.

Eddi arrived at Holby with Ian Ross (Danny Nutt), who had been in an accident. When she revealed that she was a nurse, Sacha Levy (Bob Barrett) "carjoled" her into working in AAU with him. During her shift, Eddi managed to make the ward work more efficiently and controlled the chaos. Seeing that Eddi could be an asset to the hospital, Sacha then offered her a permanent job at Holby, and she accepted. Sarah Ellis from Inside Soap commented that while Sacha was wowed by Eddi, she doubted that everyone would be as welcoming, as Eddi was a straight-talker and some of the staff found themselves on the receiving end of her "forthright opinions."

Potts said Eddi did not take any nonsense from people and her philosophy was that the nurses did the most important job in the hospital, so if they were happy, then the place would run like clockwork. Potts added "But if anyone makes problems for the nurses, Eddi will make problems for them!" A writer for the BBC's Holby City website described Eddi as being "loyal", "compassionate", "tough" and "uncompromising". Series producer Myar Craig-Brown called Eddi "very sarcastic, ironic and witty", but thought that she also exuded warmth. Craig-Brown thought the relationship that developed between Eddi and Sacha was interesting and one to watch.

During her time in the show, it was hinted that Eddi liked to drink. Potts pointed out that drinking did appear to be the only way Eddi could deal with her many issues. Potts hoped the storyline would explored further, especially as Eddi's mother was an alcoholic. She also thought it would be fun to see Eddi lose her grip. Potts added that studies had shown people with alcoholics in their families became predisposed to it themselves.

=== Brother ===
In March 2012, Eddi's younger brother, Liam (Luke Tittensor), was introduced. Eddi was "spooked" when a female patient revealed personal details about her, but she then saw the patient kissing Liam. Eddi was not comfortable with Liam's arrival and it was revealed that Eddi ran away from home to escape their alcoholic mother, leaving Liam to pick up the pieces. Knowing that Liam had been in trouble with the police, Eddi worried that he had run away. She then decided to fix things with her brother by calling his youth rehabilitation scheme to organise his transfer to Holby. A spokesperson told Inside Soap's Katy Moon that Eddi may have bitten off more than she can chew.

When Liam began a work placement on the wards, Eddi struggled with his effect on her professional life. Potts called Liam unpredictable and said Eddi did not trust him, even though he claimed he was on his best behaviour. Luc Hemingway (Joseph Millson) reckoned that Liam needed a helping hand, but Eddi could not see it because she is his sister and had been "emotionally polluted" by their upbringing. Potts quipped that the fact Liam and Luc were forming a bond annoyed Eddi even more. When Liam began to neglect his duties on AAU to watch Luc in surgery, Eddi became frustrated with him and at one point she pulled him out of theatre and asked him to leave the hospital. Luc then offered to become Liam's mentor.

=== Relationship with Luc Hemingway ===
Eddi first met Luc Hemingway on the roof of the hospital. They later clashed when a hungover Eddi drunkenly climbed onto the roof of Luc's camper van and woke him up. They later disagreed over the treatment of a patient, but it was clear there was an attraction between them. Millson explained that Eddi usually had the upper hand with everyone, but she initially could not work Luc out and thought he was making fun of her. Millson said it took a seven or eight episodes for her to realise that Luc liked her. Speaking to Laura Pledger from the Radio Times, Millson later said the writers were focussed on developing the relationship between Luc and Eddi. He called them "a very unlikely pair" and thought their relationship was fun and not predictable like others. He commented, "Strangely, [that] feels much more real and I think – if indeed anything ever does happen – it'll be in a really realistic way, not in a kind of violins and roses way." Potts called Luc "socially inept" and said that every time Eddi took a step closer to him, he would do something to make her step back again. She revealed that she got fan-mail from people who wanted Eddi and Luc to get together, but Potts thought if they became a couple, it would be "the most dysfunctional relationship on the planet!"

Luc later declared his feelings for Eddi and they shared a kiss, but shortly after Luc left the hospital. Upon his return, Luc could not wait to see Eddi again and Millson said that Luc had fallen in love with Eddi, which he did not do very often. However, the first time he saw Eddi, she was kissing locum consultant Max Schneider (John Light). Luc became jealous of Max and Millson thought that Eddi was attracted to Max because he was the opposite to Luc. Luc told Eddi what he thought of Max, but she did not agree and turned what he said back on him. Millson quipped, "It's a real touché moment." When asked how Eddi was feeling about Luc being back, Potts said Eddi was really angry with Luc and she did not understand why he was back, because he did not explain himself. Potts also said that all Eddi wanted to know was the reason why Luc left. The actress added that Eddi thought Luc was only back to ruin things for her.

=== Max Schneider and drug addiction ===
"I think if you have been hurt before it's sometimes very easy to slip into something – you either go one of two ways, really cold like an iceberg or completely trust someone so you are taken for a ride again, which is what is happening to her."

— Potts on Eddi's relationship with Max.

New locum consultant Max Schneider caused problems for Eddi as soon as he arrived on AAU. When Max encouraged Eddi to clear the beds, she discharged a patient, who Max had cleared, and he later collapsed and had to be readmitted. Eddi was unaware that Max laid the blame on her and she agreed to go out for a drink with him. Max later stole some drugs from the hospital and framed a female patient, claiming she was a drug dealer. This led to Eddi administering the wrong dose of medication and being blamed for the drugs going missing. When Eddi found Max high on drugs, he managed to dupe her and then get her into trouble with Henrik Hanssen (Guy Henry). When some prescription painkillers went missing, Luc suspected Max had taken them, but Eddi backed him up and believed that he was innocent.

Luc managed to get a sample of Max's hair, so he could prove he was a drug user, and a worried Max asked Eddi to go to Brighton with him. Eddi agreed to leave, but when she went to get Max's bag she found the painkillers and realised he was a drug addict. Luc also learned the truth and Max left the hospital. Potts said that Eddi believed Luc had ruined her chance at happiness with Max. When Eddi was later seen with a box of painkillers, Potts commented that if she took them it would be "the start of a slippery slope." Eddi did become addicted to painkillers and Luc tried to help her overcome that addiction. Eddi initially refused to face up to her problem and tried to run away. However, her body reacted to the lack of drugs in her system and she could not carry on. Luc then managed to get Eddi to accept how much of a hold the medication had over her.

=== Departure ===
During the episode broadcast on 23 October 2012, Eddi left Holby to get help for her addiction. Shortly after the episode aired, it was confirmed that Potts had left the show after more than a year in the show. Producers did not announce her departure prior to the episode's airing, in order to surprise viewers. Of her departure, Potts stated "I am proud that I have been a part of this fantastic programme and I'm really thankful that I have had the opportunity to work on this show. I'd never say never to coming back – I absolutely love the programme and all the people at Holby." Consultant series producer Justin Young said he was sad to see Potts leave, but knew that her character would only be part of the show for a short time. He praised Potts for creating "a fantastic character" and being part of one of the most popular couples in the show's history. He added "Sarah-Jane was great to work with and we miss her. It's the end of Luc and Eddi's story for now, but who knows what the future might hold?"

== Reception ==
A Daily Post columnist believed Eddi and Chantelle "could be the answer to all Sacha's problems". A critic for the Daily Mirror disliked Eddi, saying "she's totally full of herself, and kind of annoying, but still preferable to nurse Tait". A reporter for the Daily Record observed "Eddi may appear to have put her wild youth behind her, but when it comes to hospital hierarchy, her rebellious side comes to the fore." Of Eddi's and Luc's first meeting, a Daily Mirror reporter commented that she made "the classic mistake this week of assuming a strange bloke she bumps into on the hospital roof is a patient." Another reporter for the publication thought the arrival of Eddi's brother made her "face up to demons in her past".

The Daily Mirror's Jane Simon hoped Eddi was "secretly in love with Luc" when she asked for a ward transfer to get away from him. Simon later noted the speed in which Eddi's drug addiction occurred, saying "In less than a month, Eddi's brand new addiction to the fictional painkiller Camoxidan led to her making a public exhibition of herself at Chrissie and Sacha's wedding." After Luc took Eddi away on a break, Simon quipped "When she's not throwing up, it's actually quite romantic." The Eddi and Luc pairing proved popular with viewers, who dubbed them "Team Leddi".
