= Sarah-Jane Potts =

English actress

- Born: 30 August 1976 (age 50); Bradford, West Yorkshire, England
- Occupation: Actress
- Years active: 1989–present
- Spouses: Tony Denman (m. 2002; div. 2009) Joseph Millson (m. 2013)
- Children: 1
- Relatives: Andrew-Lee Potts (brother)

Sarah-Jane Potts (born 30 August 1976) is an English actress, best known for her roles as Saint (Sarah) in Sugar Rush; Ellie, Abs' on/off girlfriend in Casualty; and Jo Lipsett in Waterloo Road. Potts is the sister of actor Andrew-Lee Potts. From 2011 to 2012, she appeared in Holby City as Senior Nurse Eddi McKee on AAU, playing a different character from the one she played in Casualty. Potts left Holby City in the second episode of series 15; her departure was kept a secret by the production team and was not reported at all by the media, resulting in a shock exit for her character.

Early in her career, she noted: "In the three years I have been acting, I have spent most of the time looking dirty, scruffy, ill or tarty."

In 2023, Potts attended East London LGBTQ+ Film Festival and virtually introduced Kinky Boots.

== Personal life ==
Potts attended Bradford's Scala Kids stage school with her brother Andrew. As a teenager she worked in a greasy spoon café in Bradford. She left school during her A-levels to star in Meat. From 1999 to 2001, she dated Erik Palladino. They met at a film festival in Sweden during the summer of 1999 and at the end of the year she moved to Los Angeles to live with him. She met her former husband, Tony Denman, when filming National Lampoon's Barely Legal and they were married in June 2002. She has a son, Buster Alan Denman, born 2004. She met her second husband, Joseph Millson, while working together on the medical drama Holby City and married him on 31 December 2013.

== Filmography ==
Film
Year	Title	Role	Notes
1997	My Son the Fanatic	Madeline Fingerhut	
1998	Woundings	Louise	
1999	Straydogs	Anna	
1999	Wonderland	Melanie	
1999	The Escort	Liz	
2000	Five Seconds to Spare	Twig	
2001	Young Blades	Radegonde / Anne	
2003	National Lampoon's Barely Legal	Ashley	
2004	Breaking Dawn	Anna	
2005	Kinky Boots	Lauren	
2007	Missed	Emma	Short film
2008	Heart of a Dragon	Amanda	
2015	The Chameleon	Sara	
2015	Photo Finish	Emma	Short film
2019	Burning Men	Belladonna	
2021	The Lockdown Hauntings	Nicola's Mum	
2021	Vengeance Is Mine	Emma	
2022	The Magician.	The woman	Short film
2022	The Silent Canary	Wendy	Short film
2022	Prancer: A Christmas Tale	Claire	
2023	In Camera	C D	
2025	Signs of Life	Anne	

Television
Year	Title	Role	Notes
1989	Children's Ward	Unknown	Guest role
1994	Meat	Myra	Television film
1995	The Bill	Mandy	Episode: "To Crack a Nut"
1995	Moving Story	Joy	Episode: "Superstition"
1996	Peak Practice	Maddie Taylor	Episode: "A New Life"
1996	Bramwell	Rose Tully	Series 2: Episode 6
1996	Out of the Blue	Kirsty	Series 2: Episode 6
1996	Scene	Alison	Episode: "Alison"
1997	The Canterville Ghost	Virginia Otis	Television film
1997	The Broker's Man	Harriet Potter	Main role; 6 episodes
1997	The Locksmith	Alice Pierce	Miniseries; all 6 episodes
1999	Dalziel and Pascoe	Sophie Richmond	Episode: "Time to Go"
2000–2001	Felicity	Molly	Recurring role; 14 episodes
2002	Deep Cover	Georgia Haley	Television series
2002	Off Centre	Julie	Episode: "Cockfight"
2002	NYPD Blue	Elizabeth Garner	Episode: "Meat Me in the Park"
2003	Murder She Wrote: The Celtic Riddle	Breeta Byrne	Television film
2003	The Legend of Tarzan	Bonnie Porter	Episode: "Unaired Pilot"
2003	American Dreams	Kara	Episode: "Change a Comin'"; Episode: "The Long Goodbye"
2003–2004	Keen Eddie	Audry	Episode: "Pilot: Eddie"; Episode: "Sucker Punch"; Episode: "Citizen Cecil"
2005	Bodies	Ruth Duncan	Series 2: Episode 9
2006	Sugar Rush	Saint (Sarah)	Main role; 10 episodes
2007	You Can Choose Your Friends	Chloe	Television film
2008	Casualty	Ellie Bridges	Recurring role; 10 episodes
2008	Emmerdale	Leanne Grounding	3 episodes
2009–2010	Waterloo Road	Jo Lipsett	Series 5; 18 episodes
2010	Reunited	Fran	Television film
2011	Zen	Cinzia Miletti	Episode: "Ratking"
2011–2012	Holby City	Eddi McKee	Series regular; 58 episodes
2014	Gracepoint	Gemma	All 10 episodes
2015	New Tricks	Antoinette Pembury	Episode: "The Crazy Gang"
2016	Doctors	Roz Farrall	Episode: "I'll Cry If I Want To"
2017	The Good Karma Hospital	Vicky Martin	Series 1: Episode 4
2017	8 Days That Made Rome	Agrippina	Episode: "The Downfall of Nero"
2019	Stock	Officer	Television short
2020	There She Goes	Lisa	Episode: "Marmalade Chunks"
2021	Zero Chill	Jenny MacBentley	All 10 episodes
2022	The Teacher	Mary	Supporting role; 3 episodes
