= Alex Adams (Holby City) =

- Holby City character
- Jeremy Sheffield as Alex Adams
- First appearance: "The Deep End"; 5 October 2000
- Last appearance: "On the Inside"; 6 August 2003
- Portrayed by: Jeremy Sheffield

In-universe information
- Occupation: Consultant cardiothoracic surgeon (prev. Cardiothoracic registrar)
- Family: Pete Adams (brother)
- Significant others: Victoria Merrick; Sam Kennedy; Jess Griffin

Alex Adams is a fictional character from the BBC medical drama Holby City, played by actor Jeremy Sheffield. He first appeared in the series three episode "The Deep End", broadcast on 5 October 2000. Alex arrives at Holby City hospital to work as a Cardiothoracic registrar. He is introduced as a protégé of cardiothoracic lead Anton Meyer (George Irving) and they forge a strong working relationship. Alex is characterised as a loyal, enthusiastic and honest man. He finds it difficult to commit to a relationship because he prefers to concentrate on his work. Writers made him very passionate about his role within the show, often to the point it overrides logic.

His first romance is with Victoria Merrick (Lisa Faulkner) who is murdered by a patient. He later romances senior house officer Sam Kennedy (Colette Brown). They have an affair and her fiancé, consultant surgeon Ric Griffin (Hugh Quarshie) jilts her on their wedding day. Alex also romances nurse Jess Griffin (Verona Joseph) and gets her pregnant but she later has an abortion. Writers developed feuds with Ric and cardiothoracic registrar Ed Keating (Rocky Marshall), who was unhappy with Alex securing a consultant role. While contracted to the show, producers granted Sheffield six months leave to secure other roles. Writers explained the character absence by sending him to work in Michigan.

His most notable stories include drunk driving which results in a car collision with a child and trying to die by suicide. Holby City also developed a story which sees Alex diagnosed with early on-set Parkinson's disease. The show's research team worked with the charity Parkinson's UK to ensure they accurately portrayed the illness. The story resulted in an increase in calls requesting support to both the PDS and BBC. Sheffield decided to leave the series for good at the end of his final contract. Alex last appeared during the series five episode titled "On the Inside", which was broadcast on 6 August 2003. His inclusion proved popular with television critics who found the character's good looks aesthetically pleasing. However Alex's arrogance proved unpopular with some critics.

== Development ==
=== Casting and characterisation ===
Alex is a confident person and has an ethical outlook that I aspire to. He is brilliant at what he does and is loyal, enthusiastic and honest. Sometimes, though, he can be too emotionally attached to his patients, which is a nice trait for a human being but not necessarily useful as a surgeon. Commitment in a relationship is a real issue with him and he can be stubborn when it comes to medical issues. He can be very passionate about things, sometimes to the extent that he allows it to override logic.

— Sheffield on Alex's personality.

The character and Sheffield's casting were announced on 23 September 2000. The actor prepared for the role by watching a triple bypass operation. He found the experience "fascinating" but difficult as it made him feel unwell. Alex arrives at Holby City hospital to work as surgical registrar, who specialises in cardiothoracic surgery. He is introduced as a protégé of cardiothoracic lead Anton Meyer (George Irving) and his skills impress his mentor. But Alex's attitude soon annoys fellow surgeon Kirstie Collins (Dawn McDaniel) and consultant Mike Barratt (Clive Mantle), the latter complains to Anton when Alex disobeys his orders urging him to keep his behavior in order. Alex is characterised as a successful doctor who has an unorthodox approach to work. He is ambitious and put his career first. But he has struggled to settle in one place permanently. He values his job more than finding romance. Following the murder of his girlfriend Victoria Merrick (Lisa Faulkner), writers heightened the character's cynical outlook on life once more.

The character is also confident "hero" type and spent time working in Rwanda saving lives. Sheffield has likened him to actor George Clooney, who played Doug Ross in US medical drama ER. He told a reporter from the BBC that "I'm not as confident as Alex, and I have relationships when they happen. I'm not driven by work.' He added that Alex is very "confident, passionate, intelligent and very good at what he does." Decisive with innate confidence, Alex "is able to speak his mind without any qualms." He also has an "emotionally explosive temperament". He dislikes the hospital hierarchy and does not cope well with the "formality of being a heart surgeon". Sheffield has a large tattoo on his back and he had to clear it with producers before his first shirtless scenes. They liked it and decided not to cover it because it is something Alex would have too.

=== Relationships ===
He is introduced as Anton's protégé and writers developed a good working relationship between them. Anton soon become impressed with his mentee's surgical skills. While Alex remained cautious of romancing colleagues as he did not want to upset Anton. Sheffield even believed that the two working so closely resulted in Alex taking on certain aspects of Anton's character traits. Amy Mulclair from the BBC press office stated that Anton's near-fatal shooting deeply affected Alex's work. He struggled in the aftermath because "he regards Meyer as his mentor and father-figure." Television critic Jim Shelley likened the duo of Alex and Anton to Batman and Robin, with Alex playing the role of the sidekick.

The character's first romantic relationship is with Victoria. He develops a close bond with her but she is then stabbed to death. Even though she was dating Alex, her ex-boyfriend Guy Morton (Paul Blackthorne) had been unable to accept she was moving on. Alex himself is suspected of killing her and the police focus their efforts on him. The culprit is soon revealed to be a father of a patient who had died after Victoria decided not to go through with her procedure as it would prove no good and he couldn’t except it.

Alex becomes involved with senior house officer Sam Kennedy (Colette Brown). Their involvement begins when they sleep together and the following day he is shocked to learn that Sam has begun working at the hospital. He is assigned as her mentor but makes it clear their tryst was a one-off. Brown told Dennis Ellam from the Sunday Mirror that their boss Anton does not like his staff to have relationships. She added "they're both very ambitious doctors and they wouldn't risk offending Anton, but who knows?" The pair soon begin to flirt on shift and Anton makes it known that he is not impressed with their professional conduct. Still hesitant to trust following Victoria's murder, writers extended the undeniable attraction between the pair via flirtation and mind games. The pair later share a kiss while out on New Year's Eve. She buys him an alcoholic drink and fails to inform him that it is a double measure. Alex is called out to an emergency and drives not realising he is over the legal limit. He knocks over a child and he is charged with drink driving. Alex is taken to court over the matter and on the day of the hearing Sam is overcome with guilt. Ward sister Chrissie Williams (Tina Hobley) threatens Sam that she must tell Alex the truth. When she tries to confess Alex interrupts her and declares that he loves her, forcing Sam to remain quiet.

Alex later decides to end his association with Sam. She then begins a relationship with consultant surgeon Ric Griffin (Hugh Quarshie). Writers then paired Alex with Jess Griffin (Verona Joseph). They have sex and Alex is shocked to discover she is Ric's daughter. Soon Alex begins and affair with Sam of which Brown said that she never thought she would have a "passionate love affair with the most gorgeous man on telly." Sam gets engaged to Ric but she still has feelings for Alex, which Ric notices. On the day of their wedding Ric jilts Sam at the altar. She wastes no time in pursuing Alex and they rekindle their romance.

Jess learns that she is pregnant with Alex's child. Jess falls in love with Alex but he does not want her to have the baby. She decides to have the abortion but on the day of her procedure she collapses and Ric discovers Alex is the father. He reacts violently and punches Alex. Sheffield and Quarshie filmed a fight sequence for the scenes and the latter told a reporter from the Manchester Evening News that "I'm told the punch looks very realistic, they're very safety conscious at the BBC, so as much as I wanted to `clock' Jeremy, he was never in any real danger!" Alex and Jess have a very public break-up before leaving the area.

=== Temporary departure ===
"It is pretty James Bond, arriving in a helicopter to save lives. He is in Holby to deliver heart and lungs for a double transplant but a crisis means he has to take over and save the day."

— Sheffield on Alex's dramatic return to the show.

Sheffield wanted a break from Holby City and producers granted him leave. The actor stated that "I wanted the opportunity to do other work and to come back renewed, refreshed and excited about my character and Holby City. A change is as good as a rest! From the outset it was contractually decided that I would return." He also wanted to know if producers would still hire him for other shows after fearing he had become typecast. Alex made his departure from the show during August 2002. His exit story played out alongside Anton's following Irving decision to leave Holby City permanently. Anton is suspending from operating and Alex struggles in theatre. He requires the help of a senior surgeon and Anton agrees to assist and save the patient, acting against hospital policy. The hospital board reprimand Anton who responds by accepting a job in Michigan. He convinces Alex to join him and they leave together.

While on hiatus Sheffield played another medical role in BBC drama series Hearts of Gold. He returned to filming as Alex in November 2002. The character returned in episodes airing during February 2003. He arrives back at Holby City hospital via a helicopter with a heart and lungs required for a complex transplant operation which he is keen to observe. When issues arise during the operation Alex gets involved and manage to save the patient's life. He is then offered a new consultant role at the hospital. Sheffield compared his character's return to something suitable for a James Bond movie. A BBC writer revealed that not all of his colleagues would be pleased by his return. For instance cardiothoracic registrar Ed Keating (Rocky Marshall) is annoyed that Alex secures the job.

Sheffield told Claire Brand from Inside Soap that staff nurse Sandy Harper (Laura Sadler) is the only happy he is back. Whereas Alex's ex-girlfriend Jess is upset by his return, the actor explained that "there are lots of awkward moments between them." Writers continued to develop the rivalry between Alex and Ed. Sheffield believed that working in Michigan with Anton had made the character more "career-oriented" and "more removed and aloof". He also picked up traits that Anton had which further aggravate Ed. The actor concluded that "Alex and Ed are two ambitious men who have their own perspectives on life. Consequently there are constant clashes."

=== Parkinson's disease ===
The character was centric to storylines which saw him diagnosed with early on-set Parkinson's disease. In early 2002, the show's research team contacted Parkinson's UK to inform them that they wanted to write a story about Parkinson's disease in one of their young characters. The charity, which helps people living with the condition, put the production team in contact with a young sufferer and a neurologist. Their aim was to change the common misconception that the disease only occurs in the elderly population and to further educate their audience.

Both of their public relations teams worked closely when developing the storyline. They issued embargoed press releases to the British media and Sheffield gave an interview to be featured in The Parkinson magazine. The show continued their commitment to raising awareness by offering advice to viewers. The charity and the BBC later reported that the story had positive outcomes due to a surge in calls in relation to the episodes. The episodes featuring Alex's deep brain stimulation generated calls to Parkinson's UK, which offered them a fact sheet about the surgical procedure. Andrew Marston, the then editor of Leicester Mercury watched the episodes and found it "gripping". It resonated with him so much that he decided to place the illness as the subject of their regular charity feature and also used pictures of Sheffield on promotional materials.

On-screen he decides to have treatment to combat the progression of the disease. Alex has an operation to rectify his tremor and he initially believes the procedure is successful. But when he next operates he begins to tremble and tries to hide this from his colleagues. The story ended in Alex contemplating taking his own life. When his father dies, he is overcome with grief and the prospect of living with Parkinson's also takes its toll. He goes to a farm at aims a shotgun at himself, but is talked out of proceeding.

In May 2003, it was revealed that Sheffield's contract with Holby City was due to expire. He decided to leave because he wanted a new challenge and secure other roles. Sheffield later said that the role had become monotonous and "it became a repeat cycle of my character, starting romances then losing girlfriends. It makes you lazy as an actor." Alex departed the show during the series five episode titled "On the Inside", which was broadcast on 6 August 2003.

== Reception ==
A Daily Mirror reporter named the actor a "Holby hunk". A BBC Breakfast and Yorkshire Evening Post writer branded him a "maverick surgeon" and "dashing surgeon" respectively. A Metro reporter called the character a "handsome heart surgeon". Olly Duke from The Daily Telegraph similarly branded him "the slick, heart-throb surgeon" and a Liverpool Echo writer thought he was "dashing" and a "ladies' favourite". Polly Graham from the Sunday Mirror called him a "sexy" and "rugged surgeon". Daily Record columnists believed that Alex is "hunky" and his return was "dramatic" and "turned up the heat" in the show. Ruth Brindle writing for The People thought that Alex had an honest bedside manner. She believed his "finest hour" on the show was when he performed a heart transplant on a young patient. She added that he is "the British George Clooney, with a cool exterior." David Spedding (Daily Mirror) named Alex as an "all-round nice-guy".

Rachel Mainwaring from Wales on Sunday was not a fan of the character's stories. She criticised the show for being too dark and singled out Alex's Parkinson's disease and grief following his father's death. She thought it was the most boring episode she had watched and added that his backstory was "full of great animosity, jealously and downright misery." The Daily Mirror's Jim Shelley bemoaned Alex's Parkinson's disease story. He was unimpressed that Alex believed an operation cured his tremble and quipped that it "prompted a performance of "I was blind but now I can see!" proportions." Their colleague Alun Palmer criticised Alex's appearance arguing that no "grown doctor" would wear an earring and have a "ridiculous beard". Shelley similarly stated that Alex deserved to be "locked up" for having "the worst goatee" on television.

Shelley hated the character by the time his exit aired. He said "Adams has long been Holby's most irritating, implausible member of staff – which is saying something given the rest of them. The murderers, adulterers and nymphomaniacs who work there pale into significance alongside Adams, arguably the smuggest, most narcissistic, self-piteous character on TV. Not to mention with the most ludicrous goatee." He accused the show's writers of constantly treating Alex as a hero or victim despite being "absolutely useless". Shelley also blasted the character for hiding his Parkinson's disease from his colleagues as it showcased his bad attitude and "how irritating he was to viewers." He concluded that he wished Alex had of shot himself. Shelley later commented that Alex is so arrogant that if he were made of chocolate, he would definitely eat himself.
