= Ed Keating =

Fictional character on BBC

- Holby City character
- Rocky Marshall as Ed Keating
- First appearance: "New Hearts, Old Scores"; 13 August 2002
- Last appearance: "If You Can't Do the Time..."; 18 May 2004
- Portrayed by: Rocky Marshall

In-universe information
- Occupation: Cardiothoracic registrar
- Family: George Keating (father)
- Spouse: Natalie Anderson
- Significant other: Chrissie Williams

Ed Keating is a fictional character from the BBC medical drama Holby City, played by actor Rocky Marshall. He first appeared in the series four episode "New Hearts, Old Scores", broadcast on 13 August 2002. Ed arrives at Holby City hospital to work as a cardiothoracic registrar. Ed is characterised as an ambitious "working class" man who learns how to survive hospital politics. He is "extremely loyal" but his aggressive tempter sometimes leads him into trouble. Producers introduced him alongside Tom Campbell-Gore (Denis Lawson) and Ed becomes his protégé. Writers concocted various surgical dilemmas involving organ transplants, which the duo solve in unorthodox ways. Their continued rule breaking sets them both on a journey to disgrace. They forge test results, lie to patients, carry out organ transplants without any consent and Ed lets Tom operate under the influence of alcohol.

Producers introduced Ed's father George Keating (Garry Cooper), who had gone to prison for a crime Ed had committed. When an ill George needs a heart transplant, Ed and Tom deceive their colleagues to get George at the top of the transplant list. Tom continued to perform transplants without relative's consent and these stories culminated in both of their departures from the show. Other stories for the character include an affair with ward sister Chrissie Williams (Tina Hobley). She marries Ed's friend Owen Davis (Mark Moraghan). Writers introduced a pregnancy mystery into the story and Chrissie was left wondering who the father is. Ed made his final appearance in the series six episode "If You Can't Do the Time...", which was broadcast on 18 May 2004.

== Casting ==
On 20 July 2002, Tim Randall from the Daily Record announced that Marshall had joined the cast of Holby City and that he would debut on-screen during August 2002. Marshall's first appearance on the show was in the series four episode "New Hearts, Old Scores", which was broadcast on 13 August 2002.

== Development ==
=== Characterisation ===
Superficially Ed appears easy-going and pleasant but he's ambitious and he knows how to survive in a political environment. And he's been known to let his temper get the better of him - with potentially fatal results. He admires Tom greatly and knows that his patronage is useful in his career.

— An excerpt from Ed's profile on the official Holby City website.

Ed has been described by BBC Online publicity as a "working class" man who "appeared easy going but he was ambitious." Ed knows exactly how to survive in the world of hospital politics. They added that his "aggressive temper often lead him into trouble". He is also played as "extremely loyal", especially to Tom, which proves to be "his eventual undoing". Ed is not the type of character to have long-term relationships. His short temper is very different from his usual "easy-going and pleasant" nature. This temper has led to many altercations "with potentially fatal results."

Marshall has stated that he wanted his character to have a proper relationship because he felt Ed was just involved in other character's journeys. He explained that "I seem to be a part of other people stories! Like arguing with Alex or covering up for Tom!"

As Ed is a medical professional, Marshall was tasked with learning continuous medical terminology when delivering his lines. Marshall believed that he and his colleagues were good at saying the phrases convincingly. He worried that he sometimes failed and explained "I worry I might have the wrong stress on certain lines but I personally enjoy the challenge of trying to make the lines sound as convincing as possible!" He struggled to say anaesthetist but revealed that his scripts contained medical glossaries to help familiarise himself with Ed's lines.

=== Tom Campbell-Gore's protégé ===
Ed was introduced into Holby City alongside his old friend Tom Campbell-Gore (Denis Lawson). He was hired as a replacement for "disgraced" Senior house officer Sam Kennedy (Colette Brown), working for Anton Meyer (George Irving). Ed knows that to get further in his career he needed strong allies. When he meets Tom again, he realises that he could use his support to progress in the hospital. A reporter from BBC Online evaluated that "with Mr Campbell-Gore's support, he quickly rose to the position of registrar. He admires Tom greatly and knows that his patronage is useful in his career." His "devotion" to Tom often leads him into trouble and "compromising positions". Marshall enjoyed working closely with Lawson because he had the most fun with him on the set.

In September 2002, producers introduced Ed's ex-wife Natalie Anderson (Sophie Shaw) to explore Ed's back story. The plot served as an opportunity for Tom to meddle in Ed's private life. The story begins when Ed participates in a football where he is tripped over by David Keelan (Pascal Langdale). David is revealed to be Natalie's boyfriend and the pair get into an argument. Ed's temper flares up and he punches David, knocking him unconscious and he stops breathing. David is taken to hospital and treated for a heart attack. Ed and Tom operate on David, but when Tom learns about the fight he orders Ed to leave the operating theatre. Following successful surgery, tests show that David's heart attack was caused by an existing condition.

A writer from the Daily Record reported that Ed and Natalie try to sort through the emotions they tried to bury and subsequently Ed realises he still loves her. They added that Tom would be unimpressed with Ed reconnecting with Natalie. Tom recalled how their divorce left Ed "depressed and confused" and he decides to intervene. Tom removes Ed from his ward and prevents Natalie from finding him.

During October 2002, writers had introduced transplant stories for Ed and Tom. When registrar Diane Lloyd (Patricia Potter) tells Ed that a potential heart donor has died, he wants to donate it to a young patient within his care. He argues with nurse Jess Griffin (Verona Joseph), who accuses him of being "extremely uncaring" for trying to claim her deceased patient's heart. Ed decides to bypass hospital protocol and points Nick Hadley (Christopher Smith) out to Joy Lester (Beverly Hills), the young girl's grieving mother, to influence her decision to donate. A Daily Record writer revealed that Tom soon discovers Ed's scheme and questions his ethics for attempting to accelerate a transplant procedure. They added that while Tom "helped fast-track his career, he will not put his own position on the line for Ed's rash decisions."

In November 2002, writers conjured up more unorthodox operations between the pair. Tom's home is broken into by a gang, which includes his own brother Marty (Tom McGovern). They force Tom to perform an operation on their accomplice John J (Christian Mortimer), despite being stuck in his home. Tom summons Ed to his house to help with the operation. Ed is shocked by Tom's actions and he decides he will not stand by Tom. Ed ads that says he is no longer in Tom's debt. Paul English of the Daily Record reported that the story would continue to play out when John J is admitted to their ward and Ric Griffin (Hugh Quarshie) operates on him. Ric notices that John J has recently had surgery, which leaves Ed and Tom fearing for their careers. Tom concocts a plan and gives Sandy Harper (Laura Sadler) unclear instructions. When John J dies during further surgery, Tom and Ed discuss what to do next but no one suspects anything untoward. Tom tries to incriminate Sandy, who claims she misread John J's notes because Tom did not make them clear. Despite no suspicion on him, Ed continues to worry his colleagues will find out about the earlier operation. In January 2003, Ed becomes aware that Tom has a drinking problem and is operating while under the influence of alcohol. He becomes impatient and threatens to report his mentor. In June 2003, Marshall told a reporter from BBC Online that producers had planned even more stories between Ed and Tom.

=== Affair with Chrissie Williams ===
Ed begins an affair with ward sister Chrissie Williams (Tina Hobley), despite her being in a relationship with consultant obstetrician Owen Davis (Mark Moraghan). Ed and Chrissie grow close and he confides that his father George Keating (Garry Cooper) is in prison because of a crime he committed. The pair sleep together but he tries to ignore her following their tryst. Chrissie later confronts Ed who claims to have kept away because he was worried about his confession. She convinces him to let go of his guilt and sleeps with him again. Owen begins to wonder where Chrissie has been but proposes marriage when she gets home.

Chrissie discovers that she is pregnant and is left fearing that her unborn baby may have Down syndrome. As Chrissie's wedding looms, Ed agrees to be Owen's best man at the wedding. However Chrissie is left unnerved when Ed confides in Mubbs Hussein (Ian Aspinall) about their affair. Hobley told the Daily Record's English that Chrissie leaves Owen waiting at the altar and Ed has to convince her to go ahead with the wedding. The pair share another kiss while she is in her wedding dress. Hobley added that Chrissie begs Ed "to assure her there's nothing between them and, when he says the words, she pulls herself together and realises Owen is the man for her." Writers then added in a paternity mystery to the pregnancy story. Chrissie realises that she does not know whether father of her unborn baby is Ed or Owen. Hobley added "it's very exciting. None of us know who it is yet, but I do know that Chrissie gets her just desserts [sic]."

When Owen eventually discovers the truth about the affair he throws Chrissie out, thinking the baby is Ed's. The story was made more complicated by the fact Owen was having an affair with Chrissie's mother Tricia Williams (Sharon Maughan). Ed discovers their affair and issues Owen with an ultimatum that he must choose between Chrissie and Tricia.

=== Father's illness, departure ===
Producers planned to feature Ed and Tom significantly as they brought their unorthodox operations to the forefront of the show. A Holby City publicist told a reporter from Inside Soap that "in January [2004] we the start of a big storyline when Ed visits his dad in prison. Later, his father gets released and begins working at the hospital, which causes big problems when he needs an operation." Tom continued to bend hospital rules by deciding which patients should receive organ transplants instead of those most in need. They added that Tom "ends up putting all their jobs on the line."

George is released from prison and Ed gives him a place to stay. Tom and Ed perform a heart transplant procedure but they realise the donor's partner had no right to give consent for the procedure. Tom then pressures Ed to gain consent from the donor's daughter, despite the fact they have already carried out the operation. Ed gets George a job in the hospital canteen but they agree to keep their family relationship a secret. George collapses from an angina attack while at work and Chrissie saves his life. When Ed discovers the truth about George's failing health he tries to start a treatment plan. Tom blocks this believing that George's heart in beyond repair. Ed defies Tom and orders a heart scan. Tom is left feeling more "annoyed" with Ed because he forces Tom to operate on George.

The story develops into more illegal surgery, as Ed becomes desperate to secure a heart transplant for George. An Inside Soap reporter revealed that Tom would even help Ed manipulate the hospital system. He convinces Ed to forge blood test results to guarantee his father a transplant. Zubin Khan (Art Malik) finds the genuine test results and orders that the procedure be cancelled. They said that Tom becomes "frantic" and he tells Ed he must solely take the blame and not implicate him. Writers played Ed becoming "tortured" and unable to sit medical exams due to stress. When George discovers what Ed has tried to do to secure the transplant he is angry. The story then turned into blackmail when lab technician Rankin (Ben Illis) discovers his deceit. When Tom discovers Rankin's blackmail he tells Ed that he is done with him.

The plot built up to the character's departure from Holby City. An Inside Soap reporter revealed that he would leave the hospital when his "misdemeanour's finally catch up with him." His exit also tied in with Lawson's departure from the series. When everyone discovers what Ed and Tom have been up to they confront them. Ed turns on Tom in front of their colleagues and blames him for their crimes. Ed then punches Tom in the face before leaving. Ed made his final appearance in the series six episode "If You Can't Do the Time...", which was broadcast on 18 May 2004.

== Reception ==
Stephen McGinty from The Scotsman praised Marshall's portrayal of Ed during his story with George. He said "the best performance came from Rocky Marshall as Ed Keating, a doctor willing to do just about anything to secure a brain-dead patient’s heart for his failing father. His agitation and pain were contagious. After he had successfully impersonated another doctor, doctored files and risked contaminating his father with a fresh blood disorder I, along with the rest of the viewers, was ready for a valium drip."

Catherine McDonnell of the Daily Mirror called Ed a "dedicated doctor" with "no love life" but branded his affair with Chrissie a surprise. Jon Wise from The People branded him "heart-throb Ed Keating". Jim Shelley (Daily Mirror) reviewed an episode he thought was over sexualised and observed Ed becoming the latest victim of Chrissie's man-eating ways. He joked "Chrissie was devouring the new registrar. The fact that Ed didn't want to didn't stop her." An Inside Soap reporter branded Ed's efforts to save his father's life "unethical actions". Frances Traynor from the Daily Record said that after Ed and Tom's lies "the only way for both is down and out."
