= Holby City series 5 =

Holby City
- Series 5
- No. of episodes: 52

Release
- Original network: BBC One
- Original release: 8 October 2002 – 30 September 2003

Series chronology
- ← Previous; Series 4 Next → Series 6

The fifth series of the British medical drama television series Holby City commenced airing in the United Kingdom on BBC One on 8 October 2002, and concluded on 30 September 2003.

== Cast ==
=== Main characters ===
- Ian Aspinall as Mubbs Hussein
- Luisa Bradshaw-White as Lisa Fox
- Peter de Jersey as Steve Waring (until episode 31)
- Jeremy Edwards as Danny Shaughnessy (until episode 32)
- Tina Hobley as Chrissie Williams
- Verona Joseph as Jess Griffin
- Denis Lawson as Tom Campbell-Gore
- Art Malik as Zubin Khan (from episode 37)
- Rocky Marshall as Ed Keating
- Sharon Maughan as Tricia Williams (from episode 27)
- Mark Moraghan as Owen Davis
- David Paisley as Ben Saunders (until episode 29)
- Jan Pearson as Kath Fox
- Patricia Potter as Diane Lloyd
- Hugh Quarshie as Ric Griffin
- Laura Sadler as Sandy Harper (until episode 48)
- Jeremy Sheffield as Alex Adams (until episode 45)
- Kim Vithana as Rosie Sattar (from episode 32)

=== Recurring characters ===
- Liam Garrigan as Nic Yorke (from episode 36)
- Rachel Leskovac as Kelly Yorke (from episode 39)
- Andrew Lewis as Paul Rose

== Episodes ==
No. overall	No. in series	Title	Directed by	Written by	Original release date	Viewers (millions)
108	1	"Perfect Day"	Colin Teague	Anji Loman Field	8 October 2002	7.90
Danny is pushed to the brink of despair when Kobie threatens to leave Holby for good. His troubles come to a tragic end when Kobie falls from the roof of the hospital during a bitter row between the two.
109	2	"Depths of Devotion"	Colin Teague	Stuart Morris	15 October 2002	7.78
Diane and Danny each take a side on an abuse situation. Ed bullies a woman into donating her daughter's heart, and Ed almost gets fired over it. A homeless girl gives birth to twins and then leaves them.
110	3	"Facing Facts"	Richard Platt	Julia Weston	22 October 2002	8.32
Jess tackles a carjacker who turns out to be Robbie Waring. Tom is angry that Ric did an unnecessary surgery. Mubbs is disturbed that a woman had a baby for a gay couple.
111	4	"Repercussions"	Richard Platt	Al Hunter Ashton	29 October 2002	7.69
Diane catches Danny and Lisa in bed. Tom's drug addicted brother comes in with an overdose and Tom is terrified that he will tell the staff who he is. When Owen finds out Chrissey does not want a baby, the relationship changes for the worse.
112	5	"Long Day's Night"	Bill Britten	James Stevenson	5 November 2002	7.40
The nurses bonfire night party turns into a house fire. Ed's father has an angina attack in prison and he confides in Chrissey as to why his dad is there.
113	6	"Lear's Children"	Bill Britten	Len Collin	12 November 2002	7.63
Keri finds herself in deep trouble after over -medicating a patient. Danny finds comfort in the arms of Jazmin after Kobie's tragic death.
114	7	"Old Friends"	Minkie Spiro	Martin Jameson	19 November 2002	7.67
When the patient Tom operated on is dumped outside the hospital by the drug dealers, Tom is panicked that he will wake up and recognize him. Lisa has a hard time coping with the fact her father is involved with Kath.
115	8	"Ladies' Night"	Minkie Spiro	Tony McHale	26 November 2002	7.36
Chrissey and Ed are at it again while Owen waits to propose to her at home. A woman Mubbs slept with is in the hospital and she tells her boyfriend that she slept with Mubbs last night.
116	9	"Every Cloud..."	Nigel Douglas	Susan Wilkins	3 December 2002	6.99
Chrissie is torn over the proposal and a chance to be with Ed. Terry's cancer has spread and he is in grave condition.
117	10	"Leopard Spots"	Nigel Douglas	Simon J. Ashford	10 December 2002	8.19
Tom turns his brother Martin in to the police. Kath agrees to marry Terry, then, that afternoon, finds out his cancer is terminal and he will only live for a few months.
118	11	"Sinners and Saints"	James Erskine	Chris Webb	17 December 2002	7.81
Tom's old friend comes in for surgery, with fatal results and Tom is tempted to start drinking again. Kath questions her faith when the chaplain won't bless her marriage to Terry. Sandy sees Sean for what he is.
119	12	"Sins of the Father"	James Erskine	Andrew Holden	26 December 2002	7.17
Kath and Terry's wedding day. Ric gives them dismal news after the ceremony. Tom's father comes to visit and observes an operation while interfering and angering Tom. He can't reconcile with his father before he leaves and he takes a drink.
120	13	"Time to Kill"	Simon Meyers	Andrew Holden	31 December 2002	5.91
New Years Eve party. Tom is drinking again and Ed catches him. Terry and Kath go to the beach house where Terry asks her to overdose him. Sean drugs Sandy and she wakes up naked in bed.
121	14	"Hair of the Dog"	Simon Meyers	Simon Ashdown	7 January 2003	7.60
Sandy is still reeling from the drugs. Tom has a robotic arm surgery demonstration and shows up drunk. He threatens Ed to keep quiet about it. Lisa and Kath can't cope with Terry's death. Kath prays for forgiveness. Chrissey is having second thoughts about her baby.
122	15	"Me and My Gal"	Jim Doyle	Gaby Chiappe	14 January 2003	7.69
Terry's funeral today. Tom collapses during surgery. Kath confesses to Danny. Owen asks Ed to be his best man. A young girl gives birth, and didn't know she was pregnant.
123	16	"A Right to Know"	Jim Doyle	Johanne McAndrew	21 January 2003	7.18
Terry left everything to Kath, and Lisa is suspicious. Owen's stag night. Mubbs finds out that Ed is the father of Chrissie's baby. Lisa calls the police on Kath after having a fight with Danny.
124	17	"'Til Death Us Do Part"	Richard Signy	Stuart Morris	28 January 2003	8.26
The police question the staff and plan to exhume Terry's body. Kath is told there was an eye witness. Chrissie and Owen's wedding day.
125	18	"Beneath the Skin"	Richard Signy	Stuart Morris	4 February 2003	7.61
Ric attends the autopsy, and he hides the prescription he gave Kath. They find a needle mark in Terry and Kath is arrested on suspicion of murder.
126	19	"A Kind of Loving"	Nigel Douglas	Al Hunter Ashton	11 February 2003	8.23
A crisis occurs when a power outage happens while Mubbs is operating. Kath pleads not guilty. Lisa takes it out on Danny. Ben goes off with another man at the Valentine's Day party.
127	20	"Dominoes Falling"	Nigel Douglas	Joe Fraser	18 February 2003	7.81
Alex Adams returns to Holby to do a transplant operation and is offered Tom's job. Sean pesters Sandy for money and steals the ward fund. Ben cannot decide on moving in with Tony. Return of Alex Adams
128	21	"Wonderland"	Colin Teague	Al Hunter Ashton	25 February 2003	7.42
Ed is frustrated that Alex accepted Tom's job. An old boyfriend of Ben's shows up and wants to reignite the relationship. Jess and Mubbs go for a drink, and a kiss. Chrissie's scan shows markers for Down Syndrome in the baby.
129	22	"When That Shark Bites"	Colin Teague	Johanne McAndrew	4 March 2003	8.01
Tom Campbell-Gore is back. Sean pushes Sandy to steal money from sleeping patients. Cameras are installed on the ward, due to thefts. Tom confides in Alex about his alcoholism.
130	23	"One of Our Own"	Terry Reeve	Leslie Stewart	11 March 2003	9.22
Ric sees the video of Jess and Mubbs. Tony needs a kidney and Ben offers to donate his. Mubbs tells Owen that Chrissie has been sleeping with Ed, and everyone at Holby knows. A dying old man gives Sandy all of his money.
131	24	"For Better For Worse"	Minkie Spiro & Phillip Gerard	Sarah Louise Hawkins	18 March 2003	9.20
Danny confronts Sandy about the thefts. Sandy gives Sean the money the old man gave her. He still threatens her for more. Owen sees Ed and Chrissie at his house, and loses his cool. Ric accepts a job in the private sector.
132	25	"A Tear in My Eye"	Richard Platt	Julie Watson	25 March 2003	8.84
Danny confronts Sean and he runs away. Chrissie's office is full of her belongings, courtesy of Owen. Owen catches Ed and Chrissie together in an embrace and goes wild. Ben breaks off with Tony.
133	26	"...As the Day is Long"	Richard Platt	Patrick Wilde	1 April 2003	8.35
A wife comes to see her husband only to find out he has a secret boyfriend visiting him. Diane agrees to go on a date with Steve. When a patient does not want to press charges of rape, Danny storms off because of the injustice of it.
134	27	"The One You Love: Part 1"	James Erskine	Matthew Hall	8 April 2003	7.47
At Kath's trial, the prosecution petitions the court to change the charge to murder, and she spends the night in the cells. Tom has feelings for his therapist Anita, and makes a pass at her. Steve and Diane have their official first date.
135	28	"The One You Love: Part 2"	James Erskine	Matthew Hall	15 April 2003	8.32
Kath is found not guilty. Steve won't let Robbie borrow his car. Robbie and his friend hot wire a car in the car park. Ben and Steve arrive to realize it's Ben's car, so they chase then in Steve's car and crash. Alex can't control the shaking in his hands with drugs anymore.
136	29	"Desperate Measures"	Simon Meyers	Len Collin	22 April 2003	8.00
Ben is seriously injured, but Steve's leg is trapped. Diane and Ric have to decide whether to amputate Steve's leg to get to Ben, or leave it as it is.
137	30	"Glass Half Empty"	Simon Meyers	Stuart Morris	29 April 2003	8.14
Alex receives a bad prognosis when he has tests for his shaking. Diane Lloyd has to tell Steve that Ben has died. Steve is reeling from the news and Ric convinces Robbie that he can save him from his grief.
138	31	"Going It Alone"	Keith Boak	Johanne McAndrew	6 May 2003	7.73
Chrissie can't live with her mother anymore and decides to move out. Lisa has her first day in AAU and it is a lot tougher than she thought. Just as Steve Waring is about to leave Holby, he suffers a heart attack and dies.
139	32	"By Any Other Name"	Keith Boak	Maria Jones	13 May 2003	8.21
Rosie Sattar starts today in maternity because Ben left a void. Big surprise, Danny is back from Australia. Owen and Chrissie face complications with the baby.
140	33	"Think Again"	Indra Bhose	Chris Webb	20 May 2003	7.48
Mubbs is surprised that Diane wants to terminate Steve Waring's baby.
141	34	"Seasons in the Sun"	Indra Bhose	Andrew Holden	27 May 2003	7.28
Chrissie's baby dies after an emergency Cesarean. Alex is inspired by a musician with Parkinson's. Diane's colostomy patient gets good news after surgery.
142	35	"Mum's the Word"	Clive Arnold	Al Hunter Ashton	3 June 2003	7.47
Chrissie returns to work on the day of her baby's funeral. She forbids Owen to attend, but he hides in the background at the service.
143	36	"Endgame"	Clive Arnold	Len Collin	10 June 2003	7.40
Adam's Parkinson's is bad and he can't operate. Tom is called in, but too late, the patient is dead. Nic Yorke, the new health care asst. starts today. All the girls are throwing themselves at him, but he seems to be keen on Sandy. Jess and Lisa have a party and agree to let Sandy move in.
144	37	"Private Lives"	David Jackson	Tony McHale	17 June 2003	7.70
Zubin Khan's daughter shows up at the private clinic with a bleeding woman, and convinces her father to help her. He gets Ric and Tom to operate on her without telling them that she has been smuggled into the country. Tom is furious. Note: The episode was preceded by following announcement: "Laura Sadler, who plays Sandy Harper in Holby City, is still in a critical condition following a recent incident. Laura's family have asked that we show her performance in tonight's episode. Our thoughts are with Laura, her family, and her friends."
145	38	"Can't Always Get What You Want"	Luke Watson	Paul Coates	24 June 2003	7.31
A patient has to decide whether to have her 6th baby or a heart operation, either one or the other. Alex Adam's tribunal today. Tom saves him by recommending that he not be fired, but put in the out patients clinic. Alex is angry with the result. Note: The episode was preceded by following announcement:"Laura Sadler, who played Sandy Harper in Holby City, has sadly died. Her family have requested that we continue to transmit all the episodes featuring Laura as a tribute to her."
146	39	"Loss of Faith"	Luke Watson	Martin Jameson	1 July 2003	7.65
Nic Yorke's sister Kelly starts her first day as a nurse. Elizabeth Woods has an affair with Zubin. Her abusive husband beats and rapes her and makes her say it was Zubin who did it. The police take Zubin in for questioning.
147	40	"Crossing the Line"	Sean Geoghegan	Al Hunter Ashton	8 July 2003	7.12
Zubin convinces Elizabeth Woods to tell the truth, and her husband is arrested. Ric is gambling again, this time with good results. Dr Merrick wants to do brain surgery on Alex Adams to stop his tremors.
148	41	"Eyes Wide Open"	Sean Geoghegan	Rob Fraser	15 July 2003	6.80
As Alex prepares for surgery on his brain, he and Diane get close. Chrissie's mother Tricia makes a pass at Owen. Ric gets betting advice from Nic and wins.
149	42	"The Parent Trap"	Ian Barnes	Ginnie Hole	22 July 2003	7.41
Tricia is assigned to be Owen's PA, and he is not pleased after she made a pass at him. Ric's son Leo returns to Holby and is still struggling to keep up. Tom can't commit to Anita and she may take the job she has been offered in the USA. Owen changes his mind and kisses Tricia.
150	43	"Carpe Diem"	Ian Barnes	Aileen Gross	29 July 2003	8.23
Leo is admitted with heroin in his system and is in withdrawal. Alex is happy to be back to work. Anita is tired of waiting for Tom to make a decision and she leaves. Tom races out of surgery and goes to the airport and leaves with Anita.
151	44	"Home"	Clive Arnold	Nick Saltrese	5 August 2003	7.44
Alex discovers that he has Parkinson's on his left side now. Kath gives him a message that his father has died. Alex goes home to the farm where he grew up to see his estranged family. He sends Jess a letter saying goodbye and Diane thinks he is going to kill himself. They rush to the farm to find Alex in the barn with a gun.
152	45	"On the Inside"	Dominic Keavey	Nick Saltrese	6 August 2003	5.67
Alex assists on Ed's patient in surgery and Ric is furious. Rosie's blood tests prove she is menopausal at 35 years old. Ric gets the job as Clinical Director. Chrissie confronts Owen on why he hasn't signed the divorce papers yet.
153	46	"House of Cards"	Dominic Keavey	Paul Coates	12 August 2003	6.63
Mubbs and Rosie have a patient with a difficult birth. Mubbs parents try to arrange a marriage for him. Chrissie comes home early and almost catches Tricia and Owen, but he escapes to the balcony dressed in a towel
154	47	"To Err is Human"	David Jackson	Andrea Earl	19 August 2003	8.01
When a road traffic accident comes in, Zubin has flashbacks of his wife's death. Tricia transfers to be Ric Griffin's PA to get away from Owen.
155	48	"All That You Leave Behind"	David Jackson	Len Collin	2 September 2003	7.55
Rosie tries to set Mubb's up on a date with disastrous results. Kelly, who wants Kath's job, sets her up to fail in an interview for a better job.
156	49	"A Friend in Need"	Michael Offer	Ed Jones	9 September 2003	8.49
Sandy wins £150,000 in the lottery and leaves the money to Jess, Ric and Kelly and pays off Lisa's mortgage, and then goes to Australia to hook up with Danny. Owen asks Tricia to go on holiday. Last Appearance of Sandy Harper
157	50	"Love nor Money"	Michael Offer	Matthew Hall	16 September 2003	8.52
Ric realizes there is a bad side to being clinical director when a train crash has them flooded with patients. Zubin questions the methods of an "old school" surgeon who he thinks is incompetent.
158	51	"Just Getting By"	Luke Watson	Debbie O'Malley	23 September 2003	7.20
Ric panics when Keller ward has too many suspicious deaths. Owen and Trish's holiday photos fall into the wrong hands. Kath returns to find that Kelly Yorke is quite capable on her job
159	52	"Accidents Will Happen"	Luke Watson	Stuart Morris	30 September 2003	9.09
It's Jess's 21st birthday party and the gift Ric gives her is repossessed. The cause of the Keller deaths is revealed, and Owen and Chrissie reunite.
