= Holby City series 6 =

Holby City
- Series 6
- No. of episodes: 52

Release
- Original network: BBC One
- Original release: 7 October 2003 – 12 October 2004

Series chronology
- ← Previous; Series 5 Next → Series 7

The sixth series of the British medical drama television series Holby City commenced airing in the United Kingdom on BBC One on 7 October 2003, and concluded on 12 October 2004.

== Reception ==
The British Medical Association denounced a January 2004 episode of the series which portrayed organ donation being carried out despite withdrawal of consent by the patient's relatives. Dr. Michael Wilks, chairman of the Medical Ethics Committee stated: "This simply would not happen, but its portrayal, even in a drama, is totally irresponsible and risks causing huge damage to the already struggling transplant programme."

== Cast ==
=== Main characters ===
- Kelly Adams as Mickie Hendrie (from episode 24)
- Ian Aspinall as Mubbs Hussein
- Luisa Bradshaw-White as Lisa Fox
- Tina Hobley as Chrissie Williams
- Noah Huntley as Will Curtis (from episode 29)
- Jaye Jacobs as Donna Jackson (from episode 24)
- Verona Joseph as Jess Griffin
- Denis Lawson as Tom Campbell-Gore (until episode 33)
- Art Malik as Zubin Khan
- Rocky Marshall as Ed Keating (until episode 33)
- Sharon Maughan as Tricia Williams
- Amanda Mealing as Connie Beauchamp (from episode 35)
- Mark Moraghan as Owen Davis
- Jan Pearson as Kath Fox (until episode 26)
- Patricia Potter as Diane Lloyd
- Hugh Quarshie as Ric Griffin
- Kim Vithana as Rosie Sattar

=== Recurring characters ===
- David Bedella as Carlos Fashola (from episode 42)
- Liam Garrigan as Nic Yorke (until episode 13)
- Rachel Leskovac as Kelly Yorke (until episode 17)
- Andrew Lewis as Paul Rose

== Episodes ==
No. overall	No. in series	Title	Directed by	Written by	Original release date	Viewers (millions)
160	1	"Façade"	Richard Platt	Johanne McAndrew & Elliot Hope	7 October 2003	9.05
Ed finds about Chrissie and Owen and is concerned. Ric has luck on the horses. DI Jane Archer returns to investigate more deaths on Keller ward.
161	2	"Read My Lips"	Richard Platt	Martin Jameson	14 October 2003	8.64
The police investigations continue. Stan Ashleigh returns as a patient and has a DNR order in place. Ric and Diane ignore his request with consequences
162	3	"End of the Line"	Colin Bucksey	Len Collin	21 October 2003	8.67
Chrissie finds about the relationship with Owen and her mother Tricia. A forensic psychologist is called in to question the staff about the deaths in Kellar ward.
163	4	"Trick or Treat"	Colin Bucksey	Debbie O'Malley	28 October 2003	7.53
Nic is held on suspicion of murder. Ric is served with another repossession order as his gambling is truly out of control. Mubbs and Rosie start to have feelings for each other.
164	5	"Know When to Fold"	Keith Boak	Paul Coates	4 November 2003	7.81
Jess and Kelly got to visit Nic in jail. Ric's home has been repossessed and he tries to cover it up. Mubbs and Rosie are at a standstill as she declines a date with him. Ric and Zubin are at odds as he tries to give Ric advice on managing his gambling.
165	6	"Keep it in the Family"	Keith Boak	Patrick Spence	11 November 2003	8.93
Ric has lost his home and is sleeping in his office. The Keller ward killer has claimed another victim. Rosie and Mubbs see another love triangle.
166	7	"The Devil You Know"	Rob Evans	Aileen Goss	18 November 2003	8.23
Kelly Yorke is determined to frame Kath for the murders as she wants her job. Nic is released from jail with no evidence in his involvement. Rosie's daughter is admitted to AAU.
167	8	"Understanding"	Rob Evans	Martin Jameson	25 November 2003	8.22
Kath is arrested and Ric defends her. Nic is shocked that Kelly framed her. Jess finds out that Ric is sleeping in his office and offers him a place at her flat.
168	9	"Sixty Minutes"	Michael Offer	Andrew Holden	2 December 2003	8.85
Tom Campbell-Gore is back and clashes with Zubin and Ric while they treat an emergency car crash involving a religious family. Meanwhile Nic finds out what pushed Kelly to the killings and must decide whether to turn her into the police.
169	10	"Oedipus Wrecks"	Michael Offer	Andrea Earl	9 December 2003	8.74
Nic and Kellly's mother comes in with stab wounds and Nic realizes that it is Kelly who did it. Kelly agrees to turn herself in but tries to kill her mother again. Kath stops her and she stabs Kath.
170	11	"Full Circle"	James Strong	Julia Wall	16 December 2003	9.82
Zubin finds Kath bleeding and unconscious and rushes her to theatre. Nic speaks to his mother, and rushes to her flat to find Kelly. Kelly has turned on the gas and the flat explodes, almost killing them both. The mother tells Chrissie that it was Kelly that tried to kill her.
171	12	"In the Bleak Midwinter"	James Strong	Leslie Stewart	23 December 2003	8.22
Nic and Kelly are admitted because they are injured in a gas explosion. Ric has a choice to let Kelly live or die knowing that she has killed the patients in Kellar ward. Tom Campbell-Gore hosts the Christmas party and Mubbs opts to babysit for Rosie instead. Tricia makes a fool of herself at the party.
172	13	"Never Can Say Goodbye"	Indra Bhose	Nick Saltrese	30 December 2003	8.13
Nic's condition worsens and he wants to see Kelly before he dies. She is being taken to the jail infirmary and thinks he is just saying goodbye for now. She asks him to visit her in jail and he agrees. When she goes back to her room he is rushed back to surgery and dies.
173	14	"All the King's Men"	Indra Bhose	Debbie O'Malley	6 January 2004	8.52
New Year's day. Chrissie wakes up in Mubb's bed and tries to sneak out. The organ ambulance is stuck in traffic and the recipient dies waiting for it. There is a second patient waiting as well, so they give it to him, but he dies too. Tom blames the system and Zubin calms him down.
174	15	"A Twist of Fate"	Keith Boak	Al Hunter Ashton & Martin Jameson	13 January 2004	8.43
Ric agrees to take cash for doing a private surgery, but the patient's father threatens him, that if his son dies, he won't pay up. He also threatens to have him beaten up. Rosie insists to Mubbs that he should get a woman's medical records and he doesn't. The woman lies to him and endangers the baby.
175	16	"The Buck Stops Here"	Keith Boak	Paul Coates	20 January 2004	7.89
Zubin gets Ric into counseling for his gambling addiction. A woman changes her mind about donating her daughter's heart, but Tom ignores her and takes it anyway.
176	17	"Forgive and Forget"	Clive Arnold	Susan Wilkins	27 January 2004	8.29
Jess goes to Nic Yorke's funeral and Kelly is there in handcuffs. Later, Jess visits Kelly to tell her that her mother is ill. An hour later the institution calls Jess to say that Kelly committed suicide.
177	18	"You Can Choose Your Friends..."	Clive Arnold	Helen Slavin	3 February 2004	8.00
Sammy has taken his daughters on a trip without Rosie's permission. She is frantic that she cannot get in touch with him.
178	19	"What He Would Have Wanted"	Audrey Cooke	Andrea Earl & Martin Jameson	10 February 2004	7.91
Ed's father is out of jail. Sammy brings the girls back to Rosie. Kath goes on her first date since Terry died.
179	20	"Protection"	Audrey Cooke	Julia Wall	17 February 2004	7.75
Ric tells Jess that he is moving out. Mubbs is having a hard time adjusting to Rosie's kids. Ed's father has a dizzy spell and tells Chrissie to keep it from Ed.
180	21	"Honour Thy Father"	Michael Offer	Stuart Morris	24 February 2004	8.27
Ed's father George is rushed in with heart problems and Tom operates on him. Ric comforts Diane when her patient dies.
181	22	"The Kindness of Strangers"	Michael Offer	Adrian Pagan	2 March 2004	8.16
Diane is suspicious of the relationship between a young girl and her father. George collapses again and needs a heart transplant. Sunny is suing for custody of the girls.
182	23	"The Heart of the Matter"	David Jackson	Matthew Hall	9 March 2004	7.60
Ed lies about Georges test results to put him at the top of the list, but it backfires. Mubbs starts having second thoughts about Rosie when she asks him for a large loan. Diane goes for a drink with Peter from x ray dept.
183	24	"Baptism of Fire"	David Jackson	Debbie O'Malley	16 March 2004	8.18
Two new nurses start today (Micki and Donna) they both leave bad impressions with the staff. Jess agrees to date a patient. Diane finds out that Donna slept with Peter, and decides to end it with him.
184	25	"Under Pressure"	James Strong	Paul Cornell	23 March 2004	8.50
Kath and Chrissie compete for the same position. Tom gets his consultancy post back. George is still waiting for a heart. Lisa has a blow up with Jess and Donna.
185	26	"Pastures New"	James Strong	Paul Coates	30 March 2004	7.98
Kath leaves Holby and tells Lisa how her dad died. Mubbs hits Rosie's daughter and she breaks up with him. Jess breaks up with the patient Robert she is dating. Ed fiddles the results and George get his new heart.
186	27	"Past Caring"	Indra Bhose	Julia Wall	6 April 2004	7.23
Robert is back at Holby claiming he fell of a bike, but he has a self inflicted knife wound. Ed is being blackmailed by the technician who falsified the records to get George the transplant. Jess dumps Robert.
187	28	"When Lightning Strikes Twice"	Indra Bhose	Paula Webb	13 April 2004	7.63
Ric asks Zubin to lend him money to invest in shares. When Zubin finds out it's a winner, he tells Ric he will give him a finders fee. Rosie tells Mubbs she loves him and wants him back.
188	29	"In the Line of Fire"	James Erskine	Len Collin	20 April 2004	7.91
Diane is sent to train a team of army doctor to deal with trauma victims, where she meets Will Curtis.
189	30	"Night Fever"	Simon Meyers	Rob Fraser	27 April 2004	7.94
Robert attacks Jess in her flat, Donna comes in and they both attack him and put him through a window. He is rushed to Holby where Ric operates on him, not knowing what he did to Jess.
190	31	"Out of Control"	Simon Meyers	Peter Jukes	4 May 2004	8.35
New registrar Will Curtis (from Diane's army group) starts today. He discovers that Ed and Tom gave George an infected heart and helps them cover it up.
191	32	"The Eleventh Commandment"	Simon Massey	Debbie O'Malley & Matt Parker	11 May 2004	7.77
Sammy is in a minor car accident so why does he have major injuries? Mubbs proposes to Rosie, but she wants to think about it as Sammy is pushing her to get back together.
192	33	"If You Can't Do the Time..."	Simon Massey	Neil McKay	18 May 2004	6.51
Tom separates conjoined twins without both parent's permission and it goes badly for him. He is forced to resign by Zubin. Lisa passes the interview for Kath's old job.
193	34	"Striking a Chord"	James Strong	Joe Ainsworth	25 May 2004	7.36
The anniversary of Chrissie's baby's death. Mubbs decides to tell her the results of the year-old DNA test. Lisa starts her first day as Ward Nurse.
194	35	"In at the Deep End"	James Strong	Andrew Holden	1 June 2004	7.08
Tom Campbell-Gore's replacement Connie Beauchamp starts today. Her and Will disagree on how to treat a heart patient and she orders him out of surgery.: First Appearance of Connie Beauchamp*
195	36	"We'll Meet Again"	Clive Arnold	Paul Coates	8 June 2004	6.81
Diane's sister is involved in a traffic accident. She is dying and they have to make a decision on her unborn baby.
196	37	"Holding On"	Clive Arnold	Barry Simmer	22 June 2004	7.24
They've decided on a cesarean, but Joanna dies shortly afterwards. Diane is devastated and must make a decision. Rosie gets good news.
197	38	"Letting Go"	Michael Offer	Aileen Goss	29 June 2004	6.94
Will and Connie continue to have a difference of opinion, and he is still abrupt and rude to patients. She decides to look into his background. Diane's first day back after her sister's death.
198	39	"Deception"	Michael Offer	Carol-Ann Docherty	6 July 2004	6.37
Lisa continues to have conflict with her tenants Mickie and Donna. They don't listen to her at work and are irresponsible in life. Ric spots Connie flirting with Zubin and Mubbs, after she had sex with him on her first day.
199	40	"Conflict of Interest"	David Jackson	Julia Wall	13 July 2004	6.45
Connie wants to operate on a board member's wife. When Zubin finds out, he and her have a confrontation.
200	41	"Inside Out"	David Jackson	Andrew Holden	20 July 2004	7.08
Diane takes the baby to work and Connie tells her she has to choose between her job, and the baby. Rosie and Mubbs make up yet again.
201	42	"While the Cat's Away..."	Karen Stowe	Jeff Dodds	27 July 2004	6.52
Lisa is tired of Donna's irresponsibility, and now, she is late on her rent, so she evicts her. Connie organizes a team building event, but no one shows up. They go to the pub instead.
202	43	"Under the Thumb"	Karen Stowe	Aileen Goss	3 August 2004	6.76
The baby's father wants Donna to give the child to him.Chrissie is still upset by the man her mother matched her up with.
203	44	"Hard Lesson To Learn"	Simon Meyers	Tony McHale	10 August 2004	6.10
Ric's son Leo now has a pregnant girlfriend who is a drug addict. Ric is not amused. She goes into labour and the baby must be delivered by cesarean.
204	45	"One More Chance"	Simon Meyers	Carol-Ann Docherty	17 August 2004	6.31
Connie has been keeping an eye on Will Curtis since she did the background check. He continues to be rude and abrupt to patients. This time, one of the patients has made a complaint to the board.
205	46	"Truth Will Out"	Simon Massey	Andrea Earl	31 August 2004	6.56
Because of all the complaints about Will, he faces a disciplinary board. Holby hosts a charity trolley dash, and Tricia and Carlos get to know each other better.
206	47	"Smoke and Mirrors"	Fraser MacDonald	Colin Bytheway	7 September 2004	7.22
Since the charity event, Jess has a crush on Zubin and sets her sights on him, even though she knows Ric will protest. Micky tears up her application to go to medical school to be a doctor because of something Mubbs said. Owen asks Diane to move in with him.
207	48	"Thicker Than Water"	Fraser MacDonald	Suzie Smith	14 September 2004	7.18
It's Ric's 50th birthday party and Jess tries to make Zubin jealous. Connie is still threatening to call in a favour to Will after she supported him at the hearing.
208	49	"Time Waits For No Man"	Michael Offer	Carol-Ann Docherty	21 September 2004	6.51
Tricia tells Carlos that she loves him and he is shocked. Zubin decides that he will go out with Jess, but she knocks him back and says he is too late. She is going with Raza, the guy she used to make him jealous.
209	50	"A Knight's Tale"	Michael Offer	Aileen Goss	28 September 2004	6.63
A jousting match goes horribly wrong when two rival accountants end up in Holby. Connie sends Wil back to cadaver training. Tricia thinks Carlos will end it, but he has a surprise for her. Jess ends it with Raza, then kisses Zubin.
210	51	"Wants and Needs"	Rob Evans	Martin Jameson	5 October 2004	7.22
Baby Jack's christening is today and Chrissie finds out it is in the same place her and Owens baby is buried. Will shocks everyone when his wife turns up when he misses his son's birthday party. Zubin dumps Jess because of Ric.
211	52	"Great Expectations"	Rob Evans	Peter Lloyd	12 October 2004	7.23
Micki's midwife mother shows up with a patient and demeans Micki every chance she gets. Carlos finds a lump in Tricia's breast. Jess invites Zubin for dinner and he leaves abruptly when Donna and Micki comes home.
