= Holby City series 3 =

Season of television series

Holby City
- Series 3
- No. of episodes: 30

Release
- Original network: BBC One
- Original release: 5 October 2000 – 5 June 2001

Series chronology
- ← Previous; Series 2 Next → Series 4

The third series of the British medical drama television series Holby City commenced airing in the United Kingdom on BBC One on 5 October 2000, and concluded on 5 June 2001.

== Production ==
Following its second series run of 16 episodes, the third series of Holby City ran for an extended 30 hour-long episodes. The series initially aired on Thursday nights on BBC One, before moving back to its original Tuesday night timeslot. The show's scope was expanded with the addition of a children's ward, allowing for greater diversification in patient storylines. While the series was in production, creator Mal Young deemed Holby City "the first successful new BBC1 one-hour drama format", in contrast to the failed programmes Harbour Lights and Sunburn. Although Young had once favoured soap opera stars in his casting, he reversed his position, explaining: "We're all guilty of grabbing a face, but it's a short-term gimmick. Viewers see right through it. It's the scripts that count. On the other hand, the soaps are so prevalent it's hard to find someone who hasn't been in one."

== Reception ==
Matt Wells and Maggie Brown of The Guardian opined in September 2000, while the series was in production: "Series such as Holby are what the BBC really needs, the fresh but reliable mid-week regular drama that ITV is best at."

== Cast ==
=== Main characters ===
- Colette Brown as Sam Kennedy (from episode 19)
- Peter de Jersey as Steve Waring (from episode 2)
- Jeremy Edwards as Danny Shaughnessy
- Lisa Faulkner as Victoria Merrick (until episode 26)
- Angela Griffin as Jasmine Hopkins (until episode 30)
- Tina Hobley as Chrissie Williams (from episode 30)
- George Irving as Anton Meyer
- Thusitha Jayasundera as Tash Bandara
- Adrian Lewis Morgan as Liam Evans (from episode 15)
- Clive Mantle as Mike Barratt (until episode 30)
- Dawn McDaniel as Kirstie Collins (until episode 6)
- Anna Mountford as Keri McGrath (from episode 2)
- Jan Pearson as Kath Shaughnessy
- Siobhan Redmond as Janice Taylor (from episode 2)
- Laura Sadler as Sandy Harper (from episode 1)
- Jeremy Sheffield as Alex Adams (from episode 1)
- Nicola Stephenson as Julie Fitzjohn (until episode 29)

=== Recurring and guest characters ===
- Jan Anderson as Chloe Hill (episode 19)
- Paul Blackthorne as Guy Morton (episodes 18-30)
- Tilly Blackwood as Emma Waring (from episode 12)
- George Costigan as James Campbell (episodes 24-30)
- Hari Dhillon as Sunil Gupta (from episode 26)
- Kulvinder Ghir as Anil Banerjee (from episode 8)
- Marvin Humes as Robbie Waring (from episode 2)
- Dominic Jephcott as Alistair Taylor (episode 15)
- Kwame Kwei-Armah as Fin Newton (episodes 10 and 29)
- Andrew Lewis as Paul Rose (from episode 3)
- Deborah Poplett as Anna Chandler (from episode 17)
- Patrick Ryecart as Ewan Littlewood (episodes 3-30)
- Paul Shane as Stan Ashleigh (from episode 5)
- Sheridan Smith as Miranda Locke (episodes 25−30)
- David Soul as Alan Fletcher (episode 23)
- Simon Williams as Charles Merrick (episodes 8-27)
- Roshan Seth as Kushara Bandara (episode 17)

== Episodes ==
No. overall	No. in series	Title	Directed by	Written by	Original release date	Viewers (millions)
26	1	"The Deep End"	Julie Edwards	Peter Jukes	5 October 2000	7.79
A traffic accident swamps A&E with patients. A man with an aneurysm tells his wife he was with his gay lover when it happened. He is dying and together they work out their differences to decide whether to pull the plug on him or not. A new nurse, Sandy, starts work.
27	2	"Too Much, Too Young"	Jim Goddard	Michael Jenner	12 October 2000	5.95
A young girl comes in with liver failure. Her father is a donor, but his liver is damaged through alcohol abuse. He puts pressure on his son to donate to save her life. Victoria Merrick has been transferred to paediatrics. First Appearance of Otter Ward
28	3	"The Right Thing"	Jim Goddard	Jenny Lecoat	19 October 2000	7.40
Barratt has to make a critical decision when the largest donor to the hospital insists on surgery. To operate may kill him and not to operate may leave him with a poor quality of life. Danny is sent to paediatrics; he gets attached to a bratty little girl and turns her into a nice girl.
29	4	"First Impressions"	Brett Fallis	Steve Lawson	9 November 2000	6.47
It's Julie's last day on trial as ward sister. A man dies as his wife is giving birth. Temporary nurse Brenda is not what she seems. When Sandy applies for a nurse's residence, she accidentally mentions that Julie has a daughter, and gets her evicted.
30	5	"Against All Odds"	Jim Shields	Maurice Bessman	16 November 2000	6.47
Kirstie goes behind Meyer's back and treats a dying patient with experimental drugs. Danny gets mugged in the parking lot. Barratt sings karaoke at the staff party.
31	6	"Moving On"	Jim Shields	Lynne Dallow	23 November 2000	5.65
Kirstie saves a man having a heart attack on a scaffold. A runaway with possible tuberculosis goes missing from the hospital. Danny gets frustrated with an overbearing mother in paediatrics. Final appearance of Kirstie Colins
32	7	"The Trouble with the Truth"	Brett Fallis	Colin Bytheway	30 November 2000	5.96
Jasmine spends far too much time with a dying patient and his wife and staff notice it. When a patient tells Mike a secret, Mike has to make a difficult decision, A heart patient who is going to miss her wedding is surprised by her fiancé.
33	8	"A Christmas Carol: Part 1"	Adrian Bean	Peter Pallister	14 December 2000	7.17
Meyer has to operate on his mentor, but finds out that he himself has a debilitating illness. Julie's daughter becomes seriously ill and is admitted. One misbehaving boy in the children's ward is stealing Santa's chocolates.
34	9	"A Christmas Carol: Part 2"	Adrian Bean	Andrew Rattenbury	21 December 2000	7.93
Julie begs Meyer to operate on her daughter Rosie, but he refuses as he needs time off owing to his illness. A fireman comes in with smoke inhalation, only to find out he has lung cancer. Danny and Stan bring Santa to the hospital.
35	10	"Anyone Who Had a Heart"	Julie Edwards	Al Hunter Ashton	28 December 2000	9.09
A young boy dies in a traffic accident, while another child needs a heart transplant, but the father of the deceased boy does not want to donate his son's heart.
36	11	"Extra Time"	Indra Bhose	Robert Fraser	16 January 2001	8.33
A teenage girl refuses treatment, and Janice gets in serious trouble over it.
37	12	"Runaway"	Colin Bucksey	Kate Wood	23 January 2001	8.09
Ranjet's gerbil escapes during his birthday party. Jamie sets fire to his house to get the insurance money for his father; his father is in the house and gets injured. Jamie runs away, and Steve and Jasmine look for him.
38	13	"Choices"	Colin Bucksey	Tony Lindsay	30 January 2001	7.94
A 37-year-old man dies of a heart attack while he is having a gall bladder operation. His wife demands an inquest and Mr Barratt is held responsible for his actions.
39	14	"Night Shift"	Indra Bhose	Leslie Stewart	6 February 2001	8.51
Stan stands vigil over a dying Battle of Britain veteran. A girl, Sophie, gets a nurse's costume and goes around Otter Ward in the night dispensing drugs and adjusting their monitors, almost killing two of the children.
40	15	"Winner Takes All"	Brian Kelly	Chris Webb	13 February 2001	8.26
Owen's mum dies of a heart attack; his real father shows up and does not want him, but Dr. Taylor wants to foster him. A 14-year-old girl comes in with amnesia and Dr. Merrick tells her parents she may have been assaulted. The girl is afraid to tell her parents the truth about what happened to her, and Dr. Merrick is told that she should not have expressed her opinion.
41	16	"For Better, For Worse"	Brian Kelly	Steve Lawson	20 February 2001	7.85
Liam is leaving to get married. Linda has liver problems caused by a transfusion. A recovering alcoholic is accused of drinking when a nurse finds his brother's bottle of whiskey under his bed.
42	17	"Tip of the Iceberg"	Susanna White	Colin Bytheway	27 February 2001	8.18
Liam is back at work after being jilted at the altar. Tash tells her father she is a lesbian. A figure skater's career is over after bowel surgery.
43	18	"Borrowed Time"	Kim Flitcroft	Tony Lindsay	6 March 2001	8.38
Jerome has cancer and his parents do not want him to know. He pressures Danny into telling him his test results. A girl has HIV and Kerry advises her to tell her boyfriend the truth. Danny decides to train to be a paediatric nurse.
44	19	"Private Lives, Public Faces"	Kim Flitcroft and Susanna White	Al Hunter Ashton	20 March 2001	8.74
Alex goes into surgery to assist, only to be met by the woman he slept with last night. A young man, who finds out he is dying of organ rejection, takes an overdose.
45	20	"Family Ties"	Susanna White	Jeremy Front	27 March 2001	7.75
An acquaintance from Nicky's past puts her in a difficult position, but will she do the right thing? A struggling Sacha finally opens up to a loved one.
46	21	"Snakes and Ladders"	Mike Cocker	Colin Bytheway	3 April 2001	7.90
Danny has his interview for the paediatric nurse job. A patient with cancer is told she is pregnant, which will halt her cancer treatment; she has to make a tough decision. Jasmine and Steve have a disagreement at Danny's birthday party.
47	22	"A Change is Gonna Come"	Mike Cocker	Lillie Ferrari	10 April 2001	7.60
A mother sees Steve hugging her daughter, but when she asks her about it, she claims that Steve kissed her. Steve is charged with misconduct and suspended until an inquiry is held. Danny's spends his first day as a student nurse.
48	23	"Going Gently"	Beryl Richards	Dan Sefton	17 April 2001	8.25
Steve is back after the little girl confessed that she lied about him kissing her. A meth-addicted patient refuses to take a HIV test. New locum Professor Fletcher starts work and the staff find that he is very laid back. Julie's husband is making an effort to be in Rosie's life. Victoria finds Guy taking painkillers.
49	24	"Release"	Beryl Richards	Dan Sefton	24 April 2001	7.86
Victoria sees Guy taking pills just before surgery. His patient dies on the table, and Victoria has to decide whether to report him or not; she breaks up with him. Jasmine and Steve have a date. Danny plans to move out of Kath's, and Liam offers him a room in his flat.
50	25	"I'm Not in Love"	Jim Shields	Leslie Stewart	1 May 2001	8.14
A patient, Miranda, becomes obsessed with Victoria. She is being discharged and does not want to go home. Miranda steals Victoria's scarf and wallet. Victoria and Alex go for a drink and go back to her place. Guy drives over to Victoria's place, but can't get her on the phone. He drives away and we see Miranda standing across the street from the flat. Guest appearance by Sheridan Smith
51	26	"Getting Even"	Jim Shields	Andrew Holden	8 May 2001	7.14
There are two children with meningitis in the ward. Victoria does not show up for work. Guy had been to her flat eatlier in the day, and had a fight with her on the doorstep. When no one can locate her, Alex goes around after work. Her door is open, the tap has been left running, and Victoria is lying in a pool of blood. Death of Victoria Merrick
52	27	"The Mourning After"	Brett Fallis	Colin Wyatt	15 May 2001	8.17
The staff are trying to handle the grief following Victoria's death. The police are all over the hospital questioning everyone. Alex points the finger at Guy, and he points it back at Alex.
53	28	"New Beginnings"	Brett Fallis	Ann Marie di Mambo	22 May 2001	6.84
Miranda is admitted with self-harm wounds; the police take an interest in her. Alex and Guy are forced to work together. Jasmine has words with Julie. Sandy discovers what is wrong with a patient with severe symptoms.
54	29	"Hearts and Flowers"	Paul Wroblewski	Colin Bytheway	29 May 2001	7.79
Julie and Martin are getting married. Steve's wife, Emma, is in a road accident and is admitted. Steve is torn between her and Jasmine. After questioning, Miranda Locke seems to know more about Victoria's death than she is letting on. Final appearance of Julie Fitzjohn
55	30	"The Road Less Travelled"	Paul Wroblewski	Andrew Rattenbury	5 June 2001	8.85
Mike Barratt is offered a job in New Zealand. New ward sister Chrissie starts work. Stan accidentally creates a power failure, and Meyer and James Campbell get stuck in the lift. Victoria Merrick's murderer is revealed. First appearance of Chrissie Williams Final appearances of Mike Barratt and Jasmine Hopkins
