= Zubin Khan =

- Holby City character
- Art Malik as Zubin Khan
- First appearance: "Private Lives"; 17 June 2003
- Last appearance: "Days of Repentance"; 4 October 2005
- Created by: Mal Young
- Portrayed by: Art Malik

In-universe information
- Occupation: Consultant anaesthetist; Head of ITU
- Significant other: Jess Griffin
- Religion: Muslim

Zubin Khan is a fictional character from the BBC medical drama Holby City, played by actor Art Malik. He first appeared in the series five episode "Private Lives", broadcast on 17 June 2003. Zubin arrives at Holby City hospital as a consultant anaesthetist. The BBC's drama controller Mal Young approached Malik with the offer of joining the show. He let Malik have control over Zubin's characterisation and as a result Zubin became a Muslim man with an "honourable" persona. The actor also accepted the role because he believed that Holby City positively featured many multiracial characters. To prepare for the role Malik consulted with his real-life family of surgeons and took work experience in a hospital.

Writers planned a series of dramatic affairs for the character, the first being with patient Elizabeth Woods (Emma Samms) who is also married. She becomes obsessed with Zubin, stalks him, and makes a false sexual assault allegation against him. He then proves his innocence and writers developed an "illicit affair" with nurse Jess Griffin (Verona Joseph). She is twenty years younger and also his best friend's daughter. Writers created special episodes featuring them falling in love in Paris, which were filmed on a two-week location shoot. They keep their relationship a secret and Jess becomes pregnant. She dates Senior House Officer Sean Thompson (Chinna Wodu) and pretends the baby is his. The truth eventually comes out and he and Jess get together. Other stories include Zubin being promoted as the head of the hospital's intensive care unit. When Malik decided to leave the show in 2005, Zubin's final episodes saw him investigated over a patient's death and moving to live in the United States. His final appearance occurred in the episode titled "Days of Repentance", which aired on 4 October 2005.

For his portrayal of Zubin, Malik won the "Best TV Actor" award at the 2004 Ethnic Multicultural Media Awards. The introduction of Zubin proved popular with critics of the genre, while many others opined that the character had assumed the role as Holby City's "heart-throb" archetype.

== Casting ==
In November 2002, it was announced that Art Malik had been cast in Holby City and would begin filming in February 2003. A BBC representative said that the company were happy that he had agreed to join the show and said he would appear regularly from June 2003. They added that "he will play a doctor drafted in to help sort out management problems at the hospital." BBC drama controller Mal Young approached Malik and Denis Lawson who plays Tom Campbell-Gore with the other of joining the show. He wanted to attract well known actors to the show and promised to create the characters to suit them. Producers also decided to let Malik continue working on another film project while he was contracted with them.

Malik has said that he "jumped at the chance" to join the cast of Holby City because of its history of multiracial characters. When Malik was negotiating the terms of his contract with the show, he requested that Zubin would be an "honourable" character. He also requested that the character would be a practicing Muslim, because he believed there needed to be a better Muslim representation on television. Malik told Annie Leask of the Daily Mirror that "there was no opposition to the idea, people were very supportive. I just wanted this sort of image of an educated Muslim man to reach the audience that Holby City goes out to". He also wanted to play a "moral center" character, having previously played an "evil" one. He later reflected "that's what Zubin was in Holby City. I wanted to place him there because of the turmoil happening in the world".

To prepare for the role, Malik spent time with actual anaesthetists at a south London hospital. There he began to appreciate the "crucial role" they have. In addition, he was able to gain advice from family, as his father is an eye surgeon and his brother is a neurosurgeon.

== Development ==
=== Introduction and Elizabeth Woods ===
"Professor Kahn is an outstanding anaesthetist who has become the pivotal figure in the operating room. As a result, his colleagues have the utmost respect for him."

— An excerpt from Zubin's profile on the official Holby City website.

Zubin is well respected among his colleagues and as an "outstanding anaesthetist" he is an important part of the team. Malik has said that Zubin is supposed to be perceived as a "sexy" character. Zubin made his debut in the series five episode titled "Private Lives", which was broadcast on 17 June 2003. In one of his first storylines, Zubin's estranged daughter brings in her friend with gunshot wounds for treatment. He is conflicted when he discovers that she is in the country illegally, but treats her anyway. Another plot sees his colleague Helen Grant (Susannah York) accuse Zubin of medical negligence when he incorrectly believes a patient's morphine pump is faulty.

Producers hired Emma Samms to play Elizabeth Woods and announced that she would falsely accuse Zubin of raping her. A publicist from the show revealed that "she once had a fling with Zubin. He thinks she's single but she is married and she accuses him of rape when she is found out." Samms told a reporter from The Scotsman that Elizabeth and Zubin would "get quite close". She arrives on the ward after being admitted with an ulcer but then has a cancer scare while in Zubin's care. Samms revealed that they strike up an affair despite her being married.

Their affair begins when Zubin has an "intimate chat" with Elizabeth. She confides in him that she has decided to leave her husband because he has been abusive towards her. Zubin realises that there is an attraction between them and kisses her. But it soon transpires that she is not telling Zubin the truth about her circumstances. She soon becomes "infatuated" with Zubin and Malik confirmed that his character would "battle on his hands". Emma then begins to stalk Zubin around the hospital as her obsession grows. She then steps up her vendetta and accuses Zubin of sexually assaulting her.

Zubin is arrested and suspended from his role. He has to return to the hospital under escort to retrieve his possessions and clothing so that they can be tested. He sees Elizabeth and begs her to tell the truth, but she refuses to withdraw her statement. Zubin's colleagues Kath Fox (Jan Pearson) and Chrissie Williams (Tina Hobley) begin to suspect Elizabeth's accusation and talk to her estranged husband. He states that she is "emotionally unbalanced", and they decide to support Zubin's innocence. He is eventually cleared of all charges.

=== Jess Griffin ===
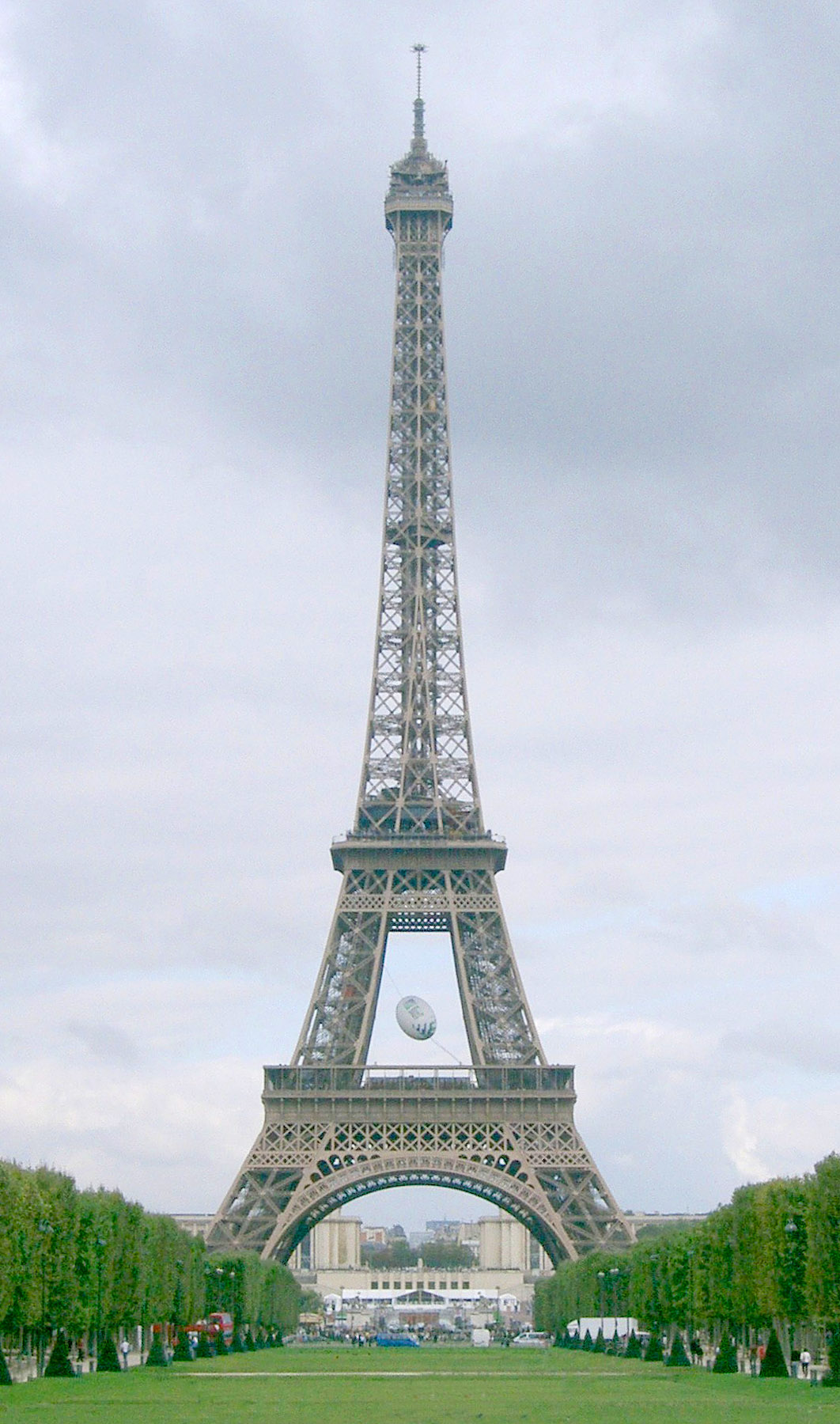
Malik and Joseph filmed scenes for their character's romance in front of the Eiffel Tower.

In one of his main stories writers decided to create a relationship with nurse Jess Griffin (Verona Joseph). Jess is the daughter of Zubin's best friend Ric Griffin (Hugh Quarshie) and is twenty years younger than him. They have to try and conceal their relationship to avoid Ric finding out. Their romance begins when Zubin and Jess realise their attraction and they share their first kiss during the episode "Hard Lesson To Learn". Joseph told Alex Tate from The People that the relationship developed unexpectedly considering their shared history. Zubin was a "really good" old family friend and more "like a godfather to Jess" than a lover. But she believed it was understandable because the respect he shows Jess. She added that Zubin's very "charming", intelligent" and "treats her like a princess".

Holby City commissioned episodes set in the French capital Paris and Malik and Joseph filmed in the city for two weeks. They filmed at many famous tourist attractions such as the Eiffel Tower in which a kiss scene was filmed. The scenes were filmed at night and the streets were cordoned off for filming. But crowds soon gathered and began cheering at the actors. Joseph felt it was "really magical and it gave me goosebumps". Malik said that otherwise they kept a "low profile" which made filming the episodes "exciting". The duo share an "illicit kiss" and sleep together. Joseph described the process as "challenging" and that she found romance scenes awkward. But Malik helped her and was the "perfect gentleman" whilst they filmed the story.

Jess becomes pregnant and is left with a difficult choice after deciding to keep the baby, she must prevent anyone from finding out Zubin is the father. Jess begins a relationship with Senior House Officer Sean Thompson (Chinna Wodu) and she lets him believe that the baby is his. Jess later rethinks her decision and psyches herself up to tell Zubin the truth. He tells her that he is happy that she has moved on with Sean which forces Jess to continue lying. Joseph told a reporter from the Manchester Evening News that "Jess's in a bit of a pickle really, she's got herself in a situation that's snowballing. Her problems are getting bigger by the episode. She hasn't been very honest with most people and she's kidding herself."

Despite their best efforts to move, Joseph believed that her character is "completely in love with Zubin and he is with her." Ultimately Zubin thinks that falling in love with his best friend's daughter is unacceptable and cannot bring himself to live openly with Jess. The actress added "Zubin's set in his ways and too scared to admit to the world that Jess is the woman he wants to spend the rest of his life with." Joseph assessed that Zubin is "standing by watching her play happy families with Sean" but not because he does not care about her. Zubin actually believes that he is helping Jess and sees being with someone closer to her own age in her best interests.

Zubin remains off-screen for a selection of episodes. In this time Jess decides to out the truth. But before she can tell Ric, Zubin returns to the hospital and it is revealed he is the new head of anaesthetics and ITU. He then begins to get involved in Jess and Sean's relationship. A patient injures Jess and leaves her with a bruise on her face. Zubin sees her bruise and assumes that Sean is hitting her. He tells Ric who attacks Sean and in argument over the misunderstanding, Zubin is shocked to learn that Jess is pregnant with his child. Jess cannot maintain her relationship with Sean and her lies begin to unravel. Wodu told Sarah Chadwick from TV Record that Sean confides in Zubin about their problems. He believes that as Jess' godfather, he can help solve the situation. This causes an altercation between Jess and Sean. Wodu added that Jess angrily tells him that she does not love him and that Zubin is actually the father of the unborn child. Jess gives birth to a boy and they name him Paris. When Zubin finds bruises on Paris' body he accuses Jess of hurting him. But they soon discover his blood is not clotting properly and is ill. Paris begins fitting and is rushed to an operating theatre where he dies.

=== Patient death and departure ===
In May 2005, it was revealed that Malik had decided to move on to new roles away from the show. One of the character's last storylines occurs when a patient named Dominic Fryer (Simon Dutton) dies. Consultant cardiothoracic surgeon Connie Beauchamp (Amanda Mealing) decides to open an investigation into his death. She suspects that registrar Diane Lloyd (Patricia Potter) is responsible because Dominic had sexually assaulted her. When the results of a post-mortem are returned, it is revealed that he has died as a result of an anaestethic overdose while being operated on by Zubin. A writer from Inside Soap revealed that Zubin is left "stunned" by the revelation he may be to blame for Dominic's death. Dominic had chosen to remain conscious during the routine operation. Zubin had only entered the operating theatre because Diane was treating him when suddenly began fitting, requiring his assistance. Zubin could not understand why his health suddenly deteriorated.

The writer added that Zubin is "humiliated at work" after he is forced to work under the supervision of a junior doctor. An inquest into Dominic's death is soon launched which they added is "damaging" for Zubin. But when he tries to redeem himself management do not reward his work. Zubin operates and notices something odd about a patient's oxygen supply. When he investigates he realises that nitrogen is leaking into the supply, which results in death. Despite solving the case Zubin decides he has enough of working at Holby City hospital and creates an exit plan to leave the trust. Jess convinces him to stay longer. But when she ends their relationship Zubin decides to leave to live in the US. His final episode was titled "Days of Repentance", which aired on 4 October 2005.

== Reception ==
For his portrayal of Zubin, Malik won the "Best TV Actor" award at the 2004 Ethnic Multicultural Media Awards. When Malik won the award, a journalist from The Times criticised the decision writing "Holby City doesn't merit any recognition." He was also nominated for "Best Actor" at the BBC's "Drama Best of..." feature for three consecutive years. He was also nominated for "Best Actor" at the 2005 TVQuick & TVChoice Awards.

A writer for the BBC website "Pure Soap" said that Malik was one of the "reliable actors" who help keep Holby City strong. Judith Woods from The Daily Telegraph branded Zubin "a dishy consultant anaesthetist with a maverick streak". The Daily Mirror's Leask branded the character as a "handsome, brooding anaesthetist". A Western Mail reporter opined that "Professor Zubin Khan is the unflappable anaesthetist in chief." Shane Donaghey from The People branded Zubin "the really cool doc" and while their colleagues Debbie Manley and Alice Walker named him a "Holby City heart-throb", a label which a Birmingham Evening Mail writer also used for the character. Graham Young from the publication chose Zubin hiring Ric's son in secret in his "Pick of the day" feature.

Sarah Dempster from The Scotsman described Zubin and Elizabeth's romance as "the tiresomely courtly tryst betwixt Dr Khan and ulcer patient Mrs Woods." Rachel Mainwaring from Wales on Sunday said that Holby City was depressing because of stories like Zubin and Elizabeth's. Following Zubin's brief sabbatical Polly Hudson from Daily Mirror was delighted by his return stating "Holby City Gasp-out-loud return of Art Malik. Yippee!". Donaghey later criticised the show for depicting Zubin operating without a mask on. He bemoaned "I know he's cool, but surely nobody's that clean when it comes to other people's insides?" The episode featuring Zubin and Jess in Paris was unpopular with The People's Sarah Moolla when she jibed "the appalling Jess and Zubin toe-curlingly bad Paris (not-so) special."

== In other media ==
On 8 October 2003, BBC One aired a "Kenyon Confronts" documentary by Panorama reporter Paul Kenyon, investigating hospitals run by the Private Finance Initiative. He discovered various issues within the hospitals, which were dramatised by the Holby City cast in specially commissioned scenes. The scenes featured Zubin locked in a broken down lift operating on a patient and highlighted the lack of beds available for treatment. This was done to convey alleged poor building plans.
