= Alex Avery =

English actor (born 1971)

- Born: Alexander Richard Avery; 6 August 1971 (age 55); Bristol, England
- Occupation: Actor
- Years active: 1999–present
- Website: alexavery.london

Alexander Richard Avery (born 6 August 1971) is an English actor. Beginning his career in 1999, he has appeared in numerous television series, films and stage productions. Alongside appearing in productions for the Royal Shakespeare Company, Avery has had notable stints in Holby City, The Bill and EastEnders, as well as portraying villain Graham Elton in the BBC soap opera Doctors.

== Life and career ==
Alexander Richard Avery was born on 6 August 1971 in Bristol. Avery's family has been involved in wine trade for over 200 years. In 1999, Avery made his television debut in the first series of the BBC medical drama series Holby City. He portrayed the recurring role of Carl until the second series. A year later, he made his film debut in Quills, as well as beginning his stage career, appearing in Another Country. He also appeared in A Tender Prayer at the Bristol Old Vic later in 2000. In 2001, he appeared in four episodes of The Bill as Special Constable Knowles. His character died at the end of Avery's stint. Then in 2004, he was cast in the BBC project Dunkirk. In December 2006, Avery made his first appearance in the BBC daytime soap opera Doctors. This marked the first of numerous of Avery's appearances in the soap.

Avery appeared in two Royal Shakespeare Company productions in 2004: The Two Gentlemen of Verona and Julius Caesar. Then in 2007, he starred in a West End theatre production Kean as the Prince of Wales. The production later toured the UK. A year later, Avery was cast in the recurring role of Simon Ackroyd on the BBC soap opera EastEnders. His character was introduced as Abi Branning (Lorna Fitzgerald) and Ben Mitchell's (Charlie Jones) teacher. He appeared again in 2014 and 2016. Throughout the early 2010s, Avery made various film appearances, including: The Grind (2012), What You Will (2012), National Theatre Live: War Horse (2014) and The Ones Below (2015). In 2019, Avery portrayed the titular role in Rose Theatre Kingston's production of Macbeth. In 2024, Avery returned to the BBC soap Doctors, but this time was cast in the recurring role of Graham Elton. At the time of his casting, Avery was unaware that he had been cast as a villain.

== Filmography ==
=== Film ===
Year	Title	Role	Notes
2000	Quills	Abbe du Maupas	
2001	Bridget Jones's Diary	Best Man	Uncredited role
2008	Last Chance Harvey	Andrew	
2010	Maria	James	Short film
2012	The Grind	Detective Inspector Greaves	
2012	What You Will	Tony	
2014	National Theatre Live: War Horse	Captain Nicholls	
2015	The Ones Below	Estate Agent	
2017	Rangoon	Major Williams	
2022	The Dunns of Brixton	Frank Dunn	

=== Television ===
Year	Title	Role	Notes
1999	Holby City	Carl	Recurring role
2001	Shades	Waiter	1 episode
2001–2002	The Bill	Special Constable Knowles	Recurring role
2002	The Project	Lib-Dem Candidate	Television film
2003	Death in Holy Orders	Mark Ayling	1 episode
2004	Dunkirk	Captain J Hendry	Main role
2004	Murder in Suburbia	Alex	Episode: "Millionaire's Row"
2005	Colditz	Collins	Episode: "Part One"
2006	Tripping Over	Larry	Recurring role
2006, 2009, 2011, 2014, 2017	Doctors	Various roles	5 episodes
2008–2009, 2014, 2016	EastEnders	Simon Ackroyd	Recurring role
2014	Holby City	Tris Mason	Episode: "True Colours"
2015	Coalition	William Hague	Television film
2015	The Coroner	Ray Mason	Episode: "Gilt"
2016	Undercover	Fred Redhead	Recurring role
2016, 2019	Casualty	Eli Brookes / Mark Eaves	2 episodes
2017	Wallis: The Queen That Never Was	Edward VIII	Television film
2022, 2024	Royal Autopsy	William Knighton / Edmund King	2 episodes
2024	Doctors	Graham Elton	Recurring role

== Stage ==
Year	Title	Role	Venue
2000	Another Country	Delahey	Oxford Playhouse
2000	A Tender Prayer	Travis	Bristol Old Vic
2001	Edward II	Levune / Gourney	Crucible Theatre
2002	The Master and Margarita	Ivan	Battersea Arts Centre
2002	The Deep Blue Sea	Jackie Jackson	Watford Palace Theatre
2004	The Two Gentlemen of Verona	Valentine	Royal Shakespeare Company
2004	Julius Caesar	Decius Brutus	Royal Shakespeare Company
2005	Presence	Conor	Drum Theatre
2007	Kean	Prince of Wales	West End / UK tour
2010–2011	Twelfth Night	Malvolio / Orsino / Aguecheek	Filter Theatre
2011	War Horse	Captain Nicholls	Gillian Lynne Theatre
2019	Macbeth	Macbeth	Rose Theatre Kingston
