= Nick Jordan (character) =

Fictional character from the BBC medical dramas Casualty and Holby City

- Casualty and Holby City character
- Michael French as Nick Jordan.
- First appearance: One from the Heart, 21 November 1998
- Last appearance: Life Goes On; 2 February 2013
- Created by: Mal Young and Tony McHale
- Portrayed by: Michael French
- Duration: 1998–2000, 2006, 2008–2013
- Spinoff(s): Casualty@Holby City (2005)

In-universe information
- Occupation: Clinical Lead, Senior Consultant in emergency medicine (prev. consultant general surgeon, specialist registrar, cardiothoracic surgery, consultant in cardiothoracic surgery)
- Spouse: Karen Newburn (divorced)
- Significant others: Kirstie Collins, Jac Naylor, Diane Lloyd, Ruth Winters, Zoe Hanna, Yvonne Rippon

Nick Jordan is a fictional character from the BBC medical dramas Casualty and Holby City, portrayed by actor Michael French. Jordan first appeared in two episodes of Casualty in 1998, before becoming a main character in spin-off show Holby City from its 1999 conception, in the role of Cardiothoracic Surgical Registrar. He departed from the show in its second series, returning for a 2005 Christmas crossover special between the two series, styled Casualty@Holby City. He returned again to Holby City in 2006, taking on the role of General Surgical Consultant, departing a few months later in order to pursue a transfer back to cardiothoracics. In 2008, he rejoined the cast of Casualty, becoming Clinical Lead of the show's Emergency Department. French left his role as Nick Jordan in February 2013, four years after his return.

== Creation ==
Nick Jordan was created in 1998 by BBC executives Mal Young and Tony McHale. He was conceived as a Cardiothoracic Surgical Registrar who would become a main character in new medical drama Holby City - a spin-off of the station's long-running Casualty. Unlike Casualty, which focused on the Emergency Department of the fictional Holby City Hospital, Holby City would centre around the hospital's cardiothoracic surgical ward, Darwin. The main characters were all staff on the ward, with Nick Jordan working on the surgical firm of lead Consultant Anton Meyer. Discussing the show's conception as a spin-off, Young has explained: "Like most people I've often wondered what happens next to those patients who come in after accidents. Where do they go when you see them disappearing upstairs on a trolley at the end of an episode? As I thought about this, it struck me – why start afresh when you've got the basis of a series already? People have busy lives and if they already follow a number of soaps, they take to a new drama series when they make sense quickly. This could be a way of helping that to happen."

The original cast of Holby City featured a number of established actors. Michael French, cast as Nick Jordan, was already well known for his role as David Wicks in EastEnders. French's cast-mates included George Irving, Angela Griffin, Lisa Faulkner and Nicola Stephenson. This propensity towards famous names was explained by Young, who commented: "Soap actors are the best actors. There's been so much snobbery before. The whole thing about typecasting was probably invented by actors who couldn't get other work. From day one I knew I wanted to put on screen people that viewers want to watch. There's no downside to that."

In preparation for assuming the role of Nick, French undertook research at the Papworth Hospital in Cambridge, observing heart surgery performed. He said of the experience: "These guys are on their feet for hours on end. If the operation demands it, they'll be there from eight in the morning until nine at night. I was there observing the intricate work they were doing, and my back started to hurt long before one operation was over, so goodness how they must feel doing it, day in, day out."

== Development ==
=== Personality ===
Asked to compare Nick Jordan to his EastEnders character David Wicks, Michael French assessed that Nick was the more compassionate of the two. Following Nick's 2006 departure from Holby City, the series' official website described him as: "decisive, confident, charismatic and passionate. He was constantly striving for the top and wanted to emulate Meyer. Six years after resigning, he returned with more arrogance and ruthlessness." Announcing the character's transfer to sister show Casualty, the BBC revealed that upon returning, Nick would have undergone another change of character, stating: "[Nick] created waves when he worked at Holby before. [But] the emergency department [will] be in for a shock when they discover he's not quite as hard-hearted and ruthless as they expected. But what, or who, could have caused this and how long will it last?" French says of Nick on returning to Holby; "He's still arrogant. [...] He gets a kick out of running the department. He's learnt from his past mistakes and is keen to start afresh. [...] He demands respect, but not everyone likes his manner. [...] His attitude towards his work has changed [...] He's a very misunderstood character."

=== Relationships ===
During his time on Holby City, Nick had several romantic interests, including ex-wife and Ward Sister Karen Newburn, Theatre Sister Ellie Sharpe, SHO Kirstie Collins, and Registrars Diane Lloyd and Jac Naylor. The series homepage assesses that: "He had tremendous pulling power with women, but commitment was not his strong point." Michael French, discussing his character shortly after the show's 1999 conception, asserted that: "Like most blokes, he sometimes treats women as playthings – if they're willing. A little bit of hanky panky is part of the human condition, after all!" Sarah Preston, who played Nick's ex-wife Karen in the first two series of the show, stated of her most memorable moments filming: "I loved my scenes with Michael, he was great to work with. Confrontation scenes give you something to get your teeth into and we had plenty of those!" Similarly, Rosie Marcel who plays Jac commented that her character and Nick "have some really bad history between them. [...] They've worked together before and Jac knows Nick will tread on anyone's toes to get to the top. It makes for some great fight scenes." Nick's series eight relationship with Diane ended, again acrimoniously, when she was blamed for a mistake he had made in theatre and refused to own up. Patricia Potter, who plays Diane, explained that when confronted; "[Nick] violently pins her against the wall and warns her never to cross him. She finally sees his other side and is devestated [sic]. Her dreams come falling down around her ears."

Upon transferring from Holby City to sister show Casualty, Nick became the object of affection of junior doctor Ruth Winters. French has commented: "Ruth is in awe of him, but he doesn't notice at the start. He doesn't bring his personal life to work. She is like putty in his hands because she's willing to learn. But [...] they start to stray a little beyond their professional boundaries..."

=== Departures and returns ===
==== Holby City ====
Nick's first return to the Holby franchise was for a 2005 Christmas crossover styled Casualty@Holby City. Series producer Emma Turner stated that: "We are delighted to be welcoming back a fantastic, original character to the wards of Holby City and are thrilled to be working with Michael French." Explaining how the character had changed in his five year absence from the show, she explained: "Nick Jordan was forced to find work wherever he could, and after stepping out of line again he realised the door to his dream job in cardio-thoracic surgery was closed and locked. He is now a general surgeon with a chip on his shoulder and a past he is desperate to keep hidden. He doesn't care who gets in his way."

The character returned to Holby City proper in February 2006, accepting the General Surgical Consultancy that his old flame Jac Naylor had been hoping to be appointed to. Rosie Marcel, who plays Jac, described the characters' reunion: "She bumps into Nick outside the hospital and the look of disgust on her face says it all. It's clear they have some really bad history between them. And then to her fury, Nick announces that he's back to stay and has been offered Jac's coveted consultant post. They've worked together before and Jac knows Nick will tread on anyones toes to get to the top. It makes for some great fight scenes." When the character departed from the show again several months later, the situation was manipulated by Cardiothoracic Consultant Connie Beauchamp (Amanda Mealing). Mealing commented: "Connie takes Nick along to [a] charity evening so that he can scmooze [sic] Lord Byrne. She knows Nick might try to worm his way into her medical department and she won't play second fiddle to him. So she's hoping Lord Byrne will take him on at his hospital, St Luke's." During the course of the evening, a bomb was detonated by Derek, a deceased patient's relative. "Connie and Nick are unharmed in the blast, but Derek's badly hurt - so they have to treat him using kitchen utensils. They employ tea towels, kitchen knives, scissors and even tongs. It's all quite ingenious! Lord Byrne is outside the kitchen. So to get his attention, she asks Nick to perform heart surgery - which is something she would normally do. Her idea works a treat. That's why I love Connie. She's always got an agenda!"

==== Casualty ====
A Casualty source told Digital Spy: "Nick's back and he's more focussed than ever. He's still striving for the top, while his arrogant and ruthless nature remains. It'll be interesting to see the dynamic he creates when he turns up at Holby ED - Casualty's emergency department. A lot's happened since Nick's been away and it's not long before his past catches up with him again..." Casualty's series producer Oliver Kent commented: "I'm really excited that Michael French will be joining us. He's a fantastic actor and Nick Jordan is an iconic character. Nick Jordan will put a few noses out of joint, most notably Adam's. Adam knows Nick Jordan's reputation of old, and finds it hard to believe that Nick is a good guy. Nick Jordan causes ripples wherever he goes, and it's great that he'll be causing ripples in Holby City's Emergency Department. The ED gang are astonished he is joining them, they certainly didn't see it coming. Some of them know him of old, whereas some of the others have just heard of his reputation - either way, his arrival certainly puts the cat among the pigeons." Michael French has stated of the transfer: "The BBC came up with the idea of Nick Jordan coming back to head up Casualty. At first, I wasn't sure about him moving away from heart surgery, but we soon thrashed some ideas around and I realised it would work. It's certainly great to play Nick again and I'm having a fantastic time on the show."

== Storylines ==
During his first tenure at Holby City Hospital, Nick's inability to remain calm under pressure hindered his surgical performance. He was accused by his boss and mentor Anton Meyer of being arrogant, and exhibited a refusal to accept when he was doing more harm than good. On one occasion, he saved a young girl by forcing open her car door before the vehicle exploded, but slit his wrists on the car's broken window in the process. After a long period of rehabilitation he was able to return to work, but came close to being invalided out of the service, as the loss of blood from the injury nearly left permanent damage which would have made it impossible for him to operate.

Nick's private and working lives frequently overlapped, as his estranged wife Karen Newburn was a Ward Sister at the hospital. A reconciliation with her caused him to respond to an emergency too late, costing a patient her life. Nick faced a tribunal, and pleaded guilty. Although the tribunal ruled not to discipline him, he decided to resign.

Nick returned for a Casualty@Holby City Christmas crossover special in 2005. He interviewed for a General Surgical Locum Consultancy post, but although he was later offered it, after demonstrating his medical skills by rescuing civilians from a collapsed tunnel, he turned the position down, stating that he would not accept anything less than a full Consultancy.

In 2006, Nick returned again to Holby City, having been offered a full Consultancy post. It was revealed that he had once had a relationship with colleague Jac Naylor, which dissolved after he blamed her for his own surgical error. He engaged in a short-lived flirtation with Registrar Diane Lloyd, but this too ended with him allowing Diane to take the blame for his own mistake - accidentally nicking a patient's urethra while in surgery. After expressing a desire to return to cardiothoracics, Nick impressed Lord Byrne - cardiothoracic head of Holby General's neighbouring hospital St Luke's - with his handling of a suicide bomb attack at a charity dinner. He was offered a Consultancy in his preferred specialty, and departed from Holby once more.

Nick returned to Holby City Hospital for a third time in 2008, this time in Holby City's sister show Casualty, as Clinical Lead of the hospital's Emergency Department. He soon began to clash with Adam Trueman about how to run the department. His experience and skill impressed junior doctor Ruth Winters and they ended up spending the night together which Nick instantly regretted and despite Ruth's attempts for it to continue he dumped her. Nick later developed a friendship with Adam Trueman's brother Alex and confided to him that he had a degenerative illness. Against Alex's advice he continued his medical practice, hiding his illness. He later signed an advance directive for Alex but was initially appalled when Alex took an overdose. However, he was true to the advance directive which he signed and temporarily made an enemy of Adam. Jordan found it harder to hide his illness, though Ruth innocently helped him when he forgot a term. Adam confronted Jordan over a lapse of concentration in the ED so in a panic, Jordan had Adam transferred to cubicles in case he suspected anything.

Jordan started to self medicate. On 4 April he took a double dose of medication. This made him dizzy and sick throughout the day. He was understanding when dealing with a pregnant woman who was in denial that her baby had died before her accident because he could relate. However, he was forced to abandon resus when he was unable to handle the scissors for an operation. He explained this away by pretending he was tired but lost his temper with a hypochondriac and rushed off to throw up. Zoe thought it was due to excessive drinking the previous night but Ruth was not so sure. Concerned, she visited Jordan in his office to check he was ok. He admitted there was a problem but as clinical lead he knew how to deal with it. Later, in his flat, he finally faced up to his problem and made an appointment with a neurosurgeon.

On 11 April Jordan was diagnosed with a brain tumour. He wanted to have it cut out rather than go through radio or chemo therapy but the neurosurgeon told him gently that it was too dangerous to remove it completely. Later, the neurosurgeon was shocked to learn Jordan was still practising medicine but Jordan assured her that anything he found too difficult he delegated to his colleagues. He wanted to make a difference while he could and would be careful not to endanger anyone. The neurosurgeon refused to allow Jordan to carry out a complicated operation so he got Ruth Winters to do it under his instructions. Later, Adam cornered Jordan, having discovered evidence of his recent mistakes. Adam, thinking that Jordan's handwriting illegibility, tremors and freezes were due to a drinking problem told him it was nothing to be ashamed of and offered to cover for him while he sorted himself out but Jordan laughed and denied that he had a drinking problem. Jordan then advised his boss to give Adam three months compassionate leave, supposedly because Adam was unfit to work but in reality out of fear that Adam would discover the truth about Jordan's illness.

Jordan had Henry observe Adam in resus for the day. He then stitched Adam up by withholding the news of Jessica giving birth and telling Adam just before their meeting with Henry. This resulted in Henry misinterpreting Adam's distress and giving him compassionate leave. An angry Adam confronted Jordan over stitching him up and through interrogation when Jordan forgot a medical term, realised there was something wrong with Jordan and that he would go to any lengths to hide it, including sacrifice Adam. Adam decided to resign rather than be pushed out but cited his many concerns about Jordan in his resignation letter. Jordan happened to read it and gave Adam an alternative resignation letter he had written, asking him to sign it. Later, Jordan froze midway through a life saving operation and Adam alone was able to come to his rescue because Adam knew of Jordan's problems. Realising he had a hold over Jordan, Adam decided against resigning and sent Jordan to his office to wait for him.

Jordan confided his condition to Adam who suggest they conceal it from their boss, Professor Henry Williams, and continue to work side by side in the ED. He also suggested Jordan enjoy his last few months and offered to ease some of the workload. Jordan grew close to Zoe and a concerned Adam asked him to confide in her. He wrote a letter, leaving it in her pigeonhole but she never got round to reading it so he retrieved it. Jordan and Zoe got into a relationship and later on planned a trip to Rome together. On the day of departure, midway through examining a patient, Jordan collapsed and had a seizure. Charlie called Zoe who tried to deal with Jordan in a professional manner despite her feelings for him. From an MRI scan, Charlie and Zoe discovered the truth but concealed Jordan's fit from the rest of the staff, blaming it on a vasovagal attack. Finding out from Adam that Jordan knew he was dying, Zoe asked why he never told her and said she couldn't cope with death in her personal life as well as her professional life. Jordan then took leave off, and spent his time living in a hotel near the sea, where he develops a close relationship with an Italian woman, who was a cleaner at his hotel, and helped to look after him. Zoe, becoming increasingly worried, tries to track down Jordan, finding his hotel when Jordan nearly exposes himself saving a man's life at a party at the hotel. Jordan starts to have suicidal thoughts, and is seen with a needle and vial among his possessions, but then decides against it. When Zoe does actually meet him, Jordan does not want to have anything to do with her.

Eventually Jordan's condition deteriorates to the point where he has to be hospitalised, causing a very worried Zoe to start bunking off her hospital duties to be at his bedside. Eventually Jordan has the option to have the life-saving operation, which he was earlier offered, but declined because he believed it would leave him with brain damage, leaving him unable to practice medicine but he wants to die, and his consent has to be given. With him falling into unconsciousness, Zoe forges his signature. This saves his life, but temporarily damages their relationship.

Jordan, no longer able to actively practice, becomes a consultant at the ED. However, after doing a major operation to save Jessica, Jordan is allowed to practice again in the ED, providing he has no contact with the patients. Jordan's confidence soars when he learns that the Board want him to take over as Clinical Lead, and makes arrangements to attend a meeting with them later in the day. But new F2 Kieron Fletcher overhears and, anxious to get Jordan alone, cancels Jordan's lift to the meeting and offers to take him himself. When Kieron drives Jordan to the middle of nowhere and tries to speak to him about a woman named Christine Fletcher, Jordan is furious and dismisses the name as a former patient. Jordan is livid at Kieron's behaviour at the scene and, back at the ED, orders him out of resus. With Kieron absent, Jordan coaxes a board member to the ED and impresses her with his handling of a patient, securing the job. At the end of the night, Jordan warns Kieron that he was unimpressed with his actions that day, but is floored when Kieron reveals that he has been trying to tell him that he is Jordan's son.

Kieron tells Jordan he was wrong about his parentage - Jordan's not his father. Jordan is relieved that the matter is settled. After Keiron has a motorbike accident Jordan agrees to have a DNA test and he begins to bond with Keiron and Jordan tells Keiron he has five years left to live. Noel then gives the result of the DNA test to Jordan in his office, Jordan smiles as he is sure that Keiron is his son. He reads the test results which turn out to be negative, Kieron shortly departs after an incident in which a bronchoscope is broken, and he takes the blame on behalf of other F2s, May and Lenny.

After restarting his relationship with Zoe, when he sleeps with her after she has been proposed to, he decides he wants a long term relationship despite the fact he doesn't have long to live, and suggests that they start a family together. Zoe questions this as, unbeknownst to Nick, she is infertile, and she immediately begins fertility treatment. She soon believes she is pregnant after missing her period, but later she checks, and is devastated to find that she is not actually pregnant, even though the team in the ED believe she is, and have started celebrating. During the power cut on 14 August, he finds the fertility drugs that Zoe has been taking and brings it up with her, she breathes a sigh of relief believing her secret is out, but she soon realizes that he only knows about the fertility treatment; not about the pregnancy. Nick discovers the real truth about the pregnancy when Zoe tells him after he says that he has something also to focus on now. Nick later rebuffs Zoe in recess. The couple then break up.

On 6 November Jordan is forced to operate on a bulimic patient in spite of the fact that he is not supposed to, at the end of a shift in a meeting with Henry and reveals that he intends to return to surgery. On 2 January Jordan gets behind the wheel of a car, even though he has been banned, which leads to a fatal car accident, but a victim from the accident and her boyfriend kidnap Jordan, at knife point, a week later to perform life saving surgery. On 19 February Jordan's position comes under threat when his old mentor, Miriam Turner, joins the department as joint clinical lead, and eventually is offered the post as full clinical lead, however departs after family issues are raised. Jordan begins a relationship in 2012 with Superintendent Yvonne Rippon (Rachel Shelley). When Yvonne is stabbed during the Holby Riots, Jordan takes leave to care for his partner. Zoe assumes the Clinical Lead position. On 12 January 2013, Jordan makes a return to ED attempting to save Yvonne from death. Eventually Jordan is forced to switch off Yvonne's life support. At the end of the episode 21 of series 27, aired on 2 February 2013, he informed the team that he was leaving them forthwith. He told them that he might work in Michigan with Anton Meyer. His last words to Zoe echoed the episode title, "Life Goes On".

In March 2014, Zoe emails Jordan following the unexpected arrival of Connie Beauchamp as the ED's new Consultant. In Jordan's reply to Zoe, he warns her to be very careful around Connie, as he cannot think of a reason she would have returned to Holby unless it was for her own personal gain. In May 2016, Jordan and Maggie offer Zoe a new job in Michigan, which she accepts.

== Reception ==
Michael French was nominated for the 'Most Popular Actor' award in the 2006 National Television Awards for his portrayal of the character. Both The Guardian and the Sunday Mirror have likened Nick to George Clooney's ER character Doug Ross - "the one everyone fancies" - with the Sunday Mirror deeming him "Handsome, talented, hot-headed and passionate. [...] Dark, brooding, sexy. If your heart needs attention Nick Jordan's the man. 8/10." Andrew Billen for the New Statesman agrees that Nick is "good-looking", but suggests French's playing another "love rat" character after his EastEnders role to be type casting.
