= Holby City series 1 =

British medical drama television series

Holby City
- Series 1
- Starring: Ian Curtis; Lisa Faulkner; Michael French; Angela Griffin; George Irving; Phyllis Logan; Luke Mably; Dawn McDaniel; Sarah Preston; Julie Saunders; Nicola Stephenson
- No. of episodes: 9

Release
- Original network: BBC One
- Original release: 12 January – 9 March 1999

Series chronology
- Next → Series 2

The first series of the British medical drama television series Holby City commenced airing in the United Kingdom on BBC One on 12 January 1999, and concluded on 9 March 1999. The show was created by Mal Young and Tony McHale as a spin–off from the BBC medical drama Casualty, intended to follow the treatment of patients from Casualty as they were transferred onto the hospital's surgical wards. McHale served as the programme's lead writer throughout the first series, which ran for nine episodes. Young cast actors who were already established names in the acting industry, particularly from a soap opera background. Several cast members shadowed real surgeons and nurses in preparation for their roles to increase the show's realism. The series received mixed reviews from critics. It was compared favourably with Casualty, but received negative reviews in which it was contrasted poorly with the American medical drama ER. The series première attracted 10.72 million viewers, falling to 8.51 million by the series finale.

The series focuses on the hospital's cardiothoracic ward, Darwin. Department heads and consultant surgeons Anton Meyer (George Irving) and Muriel McKendrick (Phyllis Logan) clash frequently over patient care and division of beds. Tension arises between nurses Julie Fitzjohn (Nicola Stephenson) and Jasmine Hopkins (Angela Griffin) over the position of Darwin ward sister. Registrar Nick Jordan (Michael French) clashes professionally with his estranged wife Karen Newburn (Sarah Preston), and pursues relationships with registrar Kirstie Collins (Dawn McDaniel) and theatre sister Ellie Sharpe (Julie Saunders). Ward clerk Paul Ripley (Luke Mably) resigns after being caught kissing a comatose patient, and house officer Victoria Merrick (Lisa Faulkner) begins taking amphetamines to cope with the pressures of work. In the series finale, Jasmine is stabbed by thieves, and Nick endeavours to save her life in theatre.

== Production ==
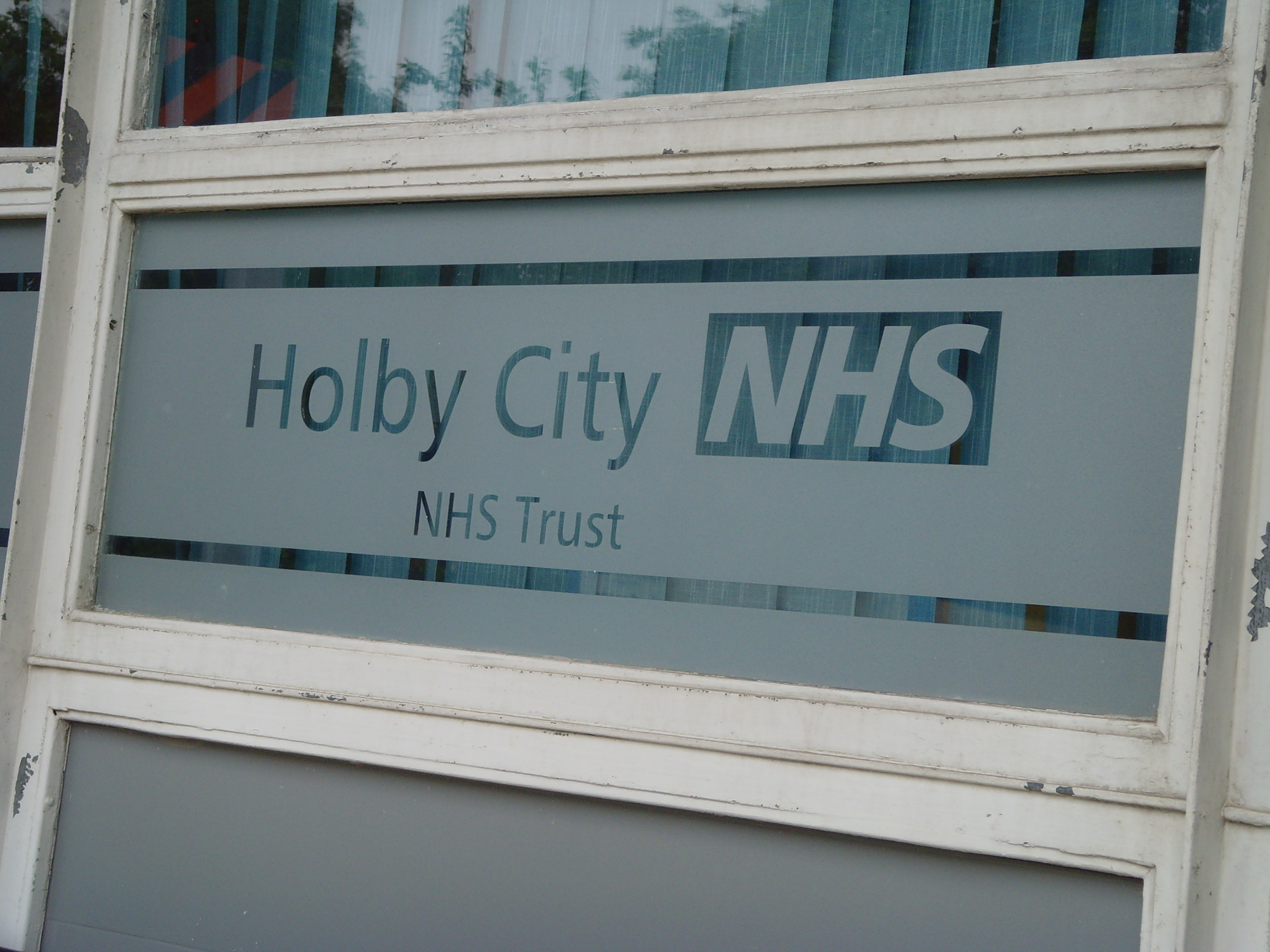
The hospital set, at Elstree Studios in Borehamwood.

Holby City was created by Tony McHale and Mal Young as a spin–off from the long–running BBC medical drama Casualty. Young wanted to explore what happened to patients treated in Casualty once they were taken away to the hospital's surgical wards. While Casualty's scope is limited to "accident of the week" storylines about patients entering hospital, Holby City allowed the possibility of storylines about long–term care, rather than immediate life and death decisions.

Although both shows are set in the same hospital, the Casualty set in Bristol was not large enough to encompass the surgical ward and operating theatre required for Holby City, so the series was produced at the BBC Elstree Centre just north of London. As a result, some crossover scenes had to be shot twice, first on the Casualty set and then again at Elstree, with cast members travelling between the two locations. McHale wrote the series' first episode, and served as the show's lead writer. Holby City premiered on 12 January 1999 on BBC One. Its first series ran for nine episodes of 50 minutes in length, which were broadcast first in the 8.10 pm, then 8 pm timeslot on Tuesdays.

== Cast ==
=== Overview ===
The first series of Holby City featured an ensemble cast of characters in the medical profession, who worked on the hospital's Darwin Ward. Phyllis Logan and George Irving played consultants Muriel McKendrick and Anton Meyer. Michael French and Dawn McDaniel appeared as registrars Nick Jordan and Kirstie Collins, while Lisa Faulkner played senior house officer Victoria Merrick. Sarah Preston and Angela Griffin played ward sisters Karen Newburn and Jasmine Hopkins. Nicola Stephenson appeared as nurse Julie Fitzjohn, and Ian Curtis played senior staff nurse Ray Sykes. Julie Saunders played theatre sister Ellie Sharpe, and Luke Mably appeared as ward clerk Paul Ripley. Logan, Saunders and Mably all departed from Holby City during the course of the series. The series also included walk–on performances by Casualty cast members, including Derek Thompson as nurse Charlie Fairhead, and guest appearances by characters first seen in Casualty, whose treatment was continued on Holby City.

In casting the first series of Holby City, Young—who had previously worked on the soap operas Brookside and Family Affairs—selected actors who were already established names in the acting industry, particularly from a soap opera background. French had starred in the BBC's EastEnders, while Stephenson and Faulkner had starred in Brookside. Griffin had also appeared in ITV's Coronation Street. Young explained: "Some of the best performances on screen have come out of soaps in the past few years. There is a fantastic amount of talent on those shows."

Cast members observed the staff at real hospitals in preparation for their roles. Stephenson and Griffin spent time at Watford Hospital, where they underwent a crash course in nursing basics, including handling bed pans and learning to make beds with hospital corners. Irving observed coronary artery bypass surgery performed at Papworth and Middlesex Hospital, while French shadowed a consultant and registrar at Papworth Hospital, observing a heart bypass and lung biopsy procedure. Young explained that viewers believe in Casualty and trust the show to be realistic, and that he wanted Holby City to be the same in that regard.

=== Main characters ===
- Ian Curtis as Ray Sykes
- Lisa Faulkner as Victoria Merrick (from episode 2)
- Michael French as Nick Jordan
- Angela Griffin as Jasmine Hopkins
- George Irving as Anton Meyer
- Phyllis Logan as Muriel McKendrick (episodes 2−9)
- Luke Mably as Paul Ripley (until episode 2)
- Dawn McDaniel as Kirstie Collins
- Sarah Preston as Karen Newburn (from episode 2)
- Julie Saunders as Ellie Sharpe (until episode 9)
- Nicola Stephenson as Julie Fitzjohn

=== Recurring and guest characters ===
- Jan Anderson as Chloe Hill (episode 1−2)
- Alex Avery as Carl (from episode 5)
- Susan Cookson as Julie Day (episode 9)
- Claire Goose as Tina Seabrook (episode 3)
- Fraser James as Peter Ellis (episodes 1 and 6)
- Jonathan Kerrigan as Sam Colloby (episode 2)
- Vincenzo Pellegrino as Derek "Sunny" Sunderland (episodes 1−2, 8−9)
- Derek Thompson as Charlie Fairhead (episode 1)

== Reception ==
"In this pale British imitation [of ER] you can almost smell the stench of hospital food and disinfectant. Like an NHS training film, the camera spins round, ER– style – and lo, frames a shot which cuts off one of the lead actor's noses. The medicine is way too graphic, showing full–screen open–heart surgery; the characters are too unsympathetic, with not a heartthrob alive or dead in sight; and the story lines are so drawn out and laborious that on the medical drama scale, Holby City is a flatliner."

— The Sunday Herald, contrasting Holby City with ER.

The series received mixed reviews from critics. Graham Keal of the Birmingham Post wrote of the first episode: "Heretical as it might seem, I liked Holby City more than Casualty, not least because the formula is so much more flexible and unpredictable." The Mirror's Charlie Catchpole wrote that he was "sick of the sensitive, hand–wringing, non–judgmental do–gooders who mope around the A&E department in Casualty", praising in comparison the "pushy, ambitious, cynical and generally thoroughly unpleasant surgeons" in Holby City.

Sam Wollaston of The Guardian received the series positively, writing: "Holby City has everything you want from a hospital drama: good–looking staff, a bit of love interest, a dishy doc, the odd current issue (no beds, badly–paid nurses) and bits where you have to look away", deeming it: "Pretty good, really." Kathleen Morgan of the Daily Record praised the casting of French and Griffin, writing: "It will take a couple of episodes before both actors shake off their soapy history, but with some decent plots and good lines, they should make the grade." Morgan deemed Irving the star of the show, and commented: "With Irving in the driving seat, Holby City looks like it is on the right track."

Andrew Billen of the New Statesman also found Irving as Meyer the series' "most compelling character", though deemed Holby City mediocre and its storylines "safely unoriginal". Billen compared Holby City negatively to the American medical drama ER, opining that the former show has a meandering pace in comparison to the latter's briskness, and that ER has a higher calibre of actors. The Sunday Herald also compared the series unfavourably to ER, writing that Holby City served to highlight ER's "true sophistication". Morgan refuted these negative comparisons, however, writing that: "The sign of great drama is when a scriptwriter and director can make a symphony out of a few notes and Holby City's creators have done that. It doesn't have the budget of ER, but it is proving just as compelling."

== Episodes ==
No. overall	No. in series	Title	Directed by	Written by	Original release date	Viewers (millions)
1	1	"Whose Heart Is It Anyway?"	Martin Hutchings	Tony McHale	12 January 1999	10.72
Best friends and senior staff nurses Julie Fitzjohn (Nicola Stephenson) and Jasmine Hopkins apply for a deputy ward sister position on the hospital's cardiothoracic surgery ward, Darwin. Although Julie assumes she is the favourite for the job, Jasmine is the successful candidate. When a heart becomes available for transplant, there are two potential recipients. Consultant cardiothoracic surgeon Anton Meyer (George Irving) initially chooses a young boy as the best match, but ends up operating on the alternative candidate when it transpires the boy has a chest infection. Jasmine, cardiothoracic registrar Nick Jordan (Michael French) and staff nurse Chloe Hill (Jan Anderson) fly to Cornwall to retrieve the donor heart. Senior house officer Kirstie Collins (Dawn McDaniel) asks Nick for permission to attend the transplant, but he refuses. Kirstie attends anyway, and is ordered out of theatre by Meyer, who is aware that Nick and Kirstie are in a relationship. As the donor heart is put in place, the father of the boy refused the operation breaks into the theatre and threatens Meyer with a scalpel. Nick defends Meyer, and the father is removed from the theatre. The heart begins to beat, and Meyer leaves Nick to close.
2	2	"Happy Families"	Nigel Douglas	Joe Turner	19 January 1999	10.40
Kirstie falls out with Nick after he has sex with theatre sister Ellie Sharpe (Julie Saunders). Julie and Jasmine also fall out, as Julie is jealous of her friend's promotion to ward sister and believes herself to have been the more deserving applicant. Consultant cardiologist Muriel McKendrick (Phyllis Logan) makes plans for a new drugs trial, and accepts Kirstie as her assistant. New senior house officer Victoria Merrick (Lisa Faulkner) struggles with her patients, one of whom chastises her for her lack of people skills. Ward clerk Paul Ripley (Luke Mably) is caught kissing comatose patient Nicola Fallon (Joanna Kirkland), and hands in his resignation after being attacked by her father (Simon Molloy). Nick's wife, Karen Newburn (Sarah Preston), begins working at the hospital as a ward sister, and the two clash professionally.
3	3	"Kill or Cure"	Nigel Douglas	James Stevenson	26 January 1999	9.42
Meyer receives a poor report of Nick from surgeon James Roberts (Bryan Murray), whose firm Nick used to work on. Nick explains that he clashed with Roberts over his habit of withholding beds from the emergency department for elective surgery patients. Meyer tells Nick that he ought to have come to him, rather than arguing with Roberts directly. Kirstie is concerned when a patient on the drug trial arrests. Muriel and senior staff nurse Ray Sykes (Ian Curtis) discourage her from informing the drugs company, but Kirstie faxes them a letter regardless. Tests reveal that Paul did not rape Nicola as her father had suspected. Nicola's mother (Karen Ford) asks for Paul to return and see her daughter, but Karen discovers he has moved to Leeds. Kirstie learns that Karen is Nick's wife, and although he explains that they are separated, she is furious with him for hiding his marriage from her.
4	4	"Love and Death"	Martin Hutchings	Joe Turner	2 February 1999	8.80
When Kirstie catches Nick and Ellie leaving a linen closet together after a tryst, she confronts Nick. He claims that he was breaking things off with Ellie, and Kirstie tells him that she wants to be more than a fling to him. Julie falls asleep at work, and Jasmine tells her she must give up her second job working in a supermarket. Muriel is angry with Kirstie for writing to the drugs company, and reveals that the patient was unsuitable for the trial, and Kirstie made a selection error. The donor heart recipient (see episode one) requests to know the identity of his organ donor. He believes that the donor was blind, as he is having nightmares about going blind himself. Nick believes the patient is rejecting the organ; however, Meyer deduces he has a chest infection and prescribes him antibiotics. A male patient tells Ray he is in love with him, and Ray tells him that he has a girlfriend. Ray later admits to Victoria that he detracts male admirers by claiming to have a girlfriend, and female ones by claiming to have a boyfriend. The patient also declares his love for Nick.
5	5	"Never Judge a Book..."	James Hawes	Tony McHale	9 February 1999	8.75
While Jasmine's fiancé, Carl (Alex Avery), is fixing a computer on the ward, Julie and Karen ask him when the wedding will be. Carl tells them June, which angers Jasmine, who had not agreed to the date beforehand. Meyer and Muriel clash over distribution of beds. Meyer and Nick operate on a baby born by Caesarean. Julie notices that the mother, Emma Wood (Hannah Storey), is uninterested in the baby, and learns that she is a surrogate who needed the money for university. She changes her mind, however, and decides to keep the baby. When a patient, Chris Moorhouse (Charles Cartmell), chokes on a sweet, Victoria performs an emergency tracheotomy. She damages his vocal cords and is reprimanded by Meyer. A dismayed Victoria begins taking amphetamines to cope with the pressures of work.
6	6	"Brave Heart"	Paul Wroblewski	Tony McHale	16 February 1999	9.77
Nick is beaten up by Ellie's boyfriend (Jamie Sives) when he discovers their affair. He is late to an operation, angering Karen, who reveals that seven years previously he was late attending to a patient as he was sleeping with a nurse. The patient subsequently died, and Karen covered up for him. Julie is fired from her second job for stealing out–of–date food and shouting at her manager. Victoria is again reprimanded by Meyer when Chris Moorhouse files a lawsuit against the hospital, and Meyer continues to clash with Muriel over bed distribution. Kirstie receives flowers from an admirer throughout the day, and learns from the florist they were ordered by Nick. As Nick is claiming to Karen that he has changed, Kirstie dumps the flowers on him, and Karen remains disbelieving.
7	7	"Take Me with You"	Paul Wroblewski	Andrew Rattenbury	23 February 1999	8.86
Nick tells Julie that he ordered the flowers for Kirstie on behalf of a patient. Victoria postpones the surgery of a patient, David Cousins (Duncan Preston), due to a problem with his heart. The patient's wife, Barbara Cousins (Carolyn Pickles), is angry, but relents when she learns from Muriel that if her husband had had the operation as planned, he could have died. Kirstie misses an exam to assist in operating on a cardiothoracic patient, Harry (Lionel Jeffries). Muriel arranges for her to take the exam the next day, instead of waiting three months for the next round of examinations. Kirstie turns down dinner with Nick in favour of staying with Harry. Julie's childminder quits as she has not been paid, and leaves Julie's daughter Rosie at the hospital. Julie spends her shift hiding Rose from Karen, who is angry when she finds out various staff members have been taking care of her throughout the day. Jasmine and Carl have an argument, during which Carl hits her.
8	8	"Staying Alive: Part 1"	James Hawes	Jeff Povey	2 March 1999	8.65
Carl arrives on the ward looking for Jasmine, who has been ignoring his calls. She returns his ring and ends their engagement. Porter Derek "Sunny" Sunderland (Vincenzo Pellegrino) wins £10,000 in a radio competition, which he donates to the cardiology unit. Kirstie decides not to go into surgery, but to remain on Muriel's team. Audrey Dewhurst, a former nurse and colleague of Muriel's, is admitted as a patient. Muriel wishes to fit her with an internal defibrillator, which will cost the hospital £25,000. Audrey refuses and discharges herself, claiming she would rather die than require nursing. Victoria confesses to Karen that she has been taking drugs. Karen refers her to Nick, who tells her to get counselling. Ray gives her the same advice; however, Victoria decides to resign. Keith (Adam Ackland) and Brad (Warren Llambias), two teenage friends of patient Darren Ingram (Sean Maguire), cause trouble on the ward and cause Darren to arrest; Victoria saves his life and decides not to quit after all. Jasmine finds Keith and Brad stealing from the drugs cupboard and chases them; she is stabbed in the stomach and collapses.
9	9	"Staying Alive: Part 2"	Nigel Douglas	Jeff Povey	9 March 1999	8.51
Nick operates on Jasmine, seemingly successfully. Whilst recovering on the ward, her condition deteriorates, and a second operation reveals that she is pregnant. Ralph (Ken Farrington) is admitted having suffered a heart attack in a lap–dancing club. He recognises Julie as one of the dancers. Karen reprimands her, but Julie admits her desperation for money to pay her bills and take care of her daughter. Karen offers her a temporary job as deputy ward sister while Jasmine recovers. Karen tells Meyer about Victoria's drug addiction and he suspends her from work. When Jasmine suffers cardiac arrest, Meyer saves her life, but states that there is a high chance she will miscarry.
