= Filter Theatre =

British theatre company

Filter Theatre is a British theatre company known for its groundbreaking use of sound and unconventional adaptions of classic texts. Claire Alfree of the Metro once called them "one of Britain's best and boldest devising companies".

The company makes new work and also reinterprets classic texts, such as Three Sisters (2010, Lyric Hammersmith).
