= Chrissie Williams =

- Holby City character
- First appearance: "The Road Less Travelled"; 5 June 2001
- Last appearance: "Merry-Go-Round"; 19 November 2013
- Portrayed by: Tina Hobley

In-universe information
- Occupation: Nurse Consultant; Senior Ward Sister; Ward Sister; Clinical Matron
- Family: Mark Williams (half-brother); Tricia Williams (mother); Frank Williams (father)
- Spouse: Owen Davis (2004); Sacha Levy (2012–14)
- Children: Amanda Williams; Daniel Levy-Williams; Rachel Levy (step-daughter); Rebecca Levy (step-daughter)

Christine "Chrissie" Williams (also Levy) is a fictional character from the BBC medical drama Holby City, played by Tina Hobley. She first appeared in the third series episode "The Road Less Travelled", broadcast on 5 June 2001. Hobley decided to leave Holby City and Chrissie's final appearance occurred in the sixteenth series episode "Merry-Go-Round", which was broadcast on 19 November 2013.

== Development ==
Chrissie first appeared in the final episode of the third series of Holby City. The episode was titled "The Road Less Travelled" and was originally broadcast on 5 June 2001. Executive producer Mal Young approached Hobley about the possibility of joining Holby City and she stated her interest. Young created the role especially for Hobley because he thought a "bitchy" role was suited to her. Chrissie was also created to replace the vacant Ward Sister role following the departure of Julie Fitzjohn (Nicola Stephenson). Chrissie is introduced via the show's cardiothoracic ward, Darwin. Of Chrissie's creation, Hobley told Claire Brand from Inside Soap that "I told Young I want to do it and he created this creature, which is quite frightening really." From her debut, writers showcased Chrissie's professional aspirations as she takes control of her ward. Hobley described Chrissie as "extremely good at her job", she "runs a very efficient ship" and she believed that Chrissie was "the best nurse at Holby City".

However, Chrissie's controlling manner causes "catty" arguments with fellow ward sister, Kath Fox (Jan Pearson). Writers also created a "strange attraction to married men" for Chrissie. This was demonstrated when Chrissie develops an attraction to Alistair Taylor (Dominic Jephcott) and her liking of Anton Meyer (George Irving). Hobley revealed that Alistair "doesn't know what's hit him" and she thinks Meyer "is God". She added that Meyer comes to "like Chrissie a lot" and is shocked by her confidence around him. Hobley concluded that when Chrissie arrives she has "a lot of baggage" from her past and wants a "fresh start". Chrissie soon discovers that her penchant for married men could threaten her new beginning.

When Sacha Levy (Bob Barrett) discovers that his daughter Rachel Levy (Imogen Byron) is diagnosed with leukaemia, she needs a bone barrow transplant. Sacha wants his and Chrissie's son, Daniel Levy to get tested to see if he is a suitable donor match. Chrissie is reluctant and Sacha decides to carry out the test regardless of her decision. Barrett told a What's on TV reporter that the story highlighted Chrissie and Sacha's incompatibilities. He noted that while Sacha really loves Chrissie "they are not soulmates", they disagree a lot and are "very different". Chrissie's stance on Rachel's illness shows their differences because "to Sacha, family is family, no matter what". Sacha can only think of Rachel's wellbeing and wants to be a "good parent" to her. Barrett claimed that Sacha would give his life for his children and readily risks his marriage with Chrissie to save Rachel.

Barrett noted that Chrissie's difference of opinion stems from Daniel being her biological child and Rachel is not. In addition the situation is "very hard for her" because of her past experiences losing a child. Barrett added that the story would divide viewer opinion. He concluded that "all I can ask, as an actor, is that people see the reason why Sacha wants to get Daniel tested - that he's so desperate for Rachel to live that he thinks it's a risk worth taking." Sacha discovers that Daniel has a heart condition which he conceals from Chrissie. He believes she will not go ahead with the procedure with the added risks. After the procedures are successful, Chrissie discovers the truth. Chrissie is shocked at Sacha's deception and it leaves their marriage ruined. Chrissie then decides to spend time in Australia with Mark.

On 30 June 2013, it was announced that Hobley would be departing Holby City. The actress commented "Being a part of the Holby family for the last 12 years has been an experience I will treasure forever but it's time to explore some new challenges. I have loved playing Chrissie Williams for the past 12 years but I'm also looking forward to getting my teeth in to some other characters and new roles." Chrissie's on-screen exit was broadcast later that year. Hobley revealed that she was happy with Chrissie's exit storyline. She praised the "amazing" writers for creating "a natural end, but a very positive one" for Chrissie. Hobley had wanted Chrissie to receive a happy ending because she was "loved" by fans. She added that Holby City's production team had hired guest stars to aid Chrissie's departure. Producers decided not kill the character off so Hobley could return. Hobley added that "it's every actor's dream for the producers not to kill off the character they've played for so long! They've kept the door open and also given Chrissie a great, positive exit." Hobley filmed her final scenes as Chrissie in September 2013.

Chrissie's final stories involved Michael Spence (Hari Dhillon) and guest character Eve Warburton (Bethan Rose Young). Chrissie and Michael consider a romance following a kiss. Eve is admitted to the hospital after suffering acid burns to her face. Chrissie asks Michael to treat Eve's condition because it reminds her of Stuart's scalpel attack. Hospital politics prevent the best treatment for Eve which prompts Chrissie to leave the hospital to take on a Nursing consultant role elsewhere.

== Reception ==
Victoria Wilson from What's on TV summed Chrissie's time in the series as "eventful" and more so in her final stories. In 2022, Wilson and Elaine Reilly from the magazine chose Stuart holding Chrissie hostage and attacking her with a scalpel in their top five moments in the show's history. Writing for Whattowatch.com, Wilson included Chrissie at number tenth in her Holby City "Top 10 greatest characters of all time" feature. Wilson assessed that Chrissie has "high standards" in her professional and love life and that her many affairs made her "the hospital's resident man-eater."
