= Rocky Marshall =

English actor

- Born: 1967 (age 57–58); Sudbury, Suffolk, England
- Occupation: Actor

Rocky Marshall (born c. 1967) is an English television and film actor, living near Battersea Park.

== Biography ==
Rocky Marshall trained at Mountview Academy of Theatre Arts and was taught by Sam Kogan for the first 2 years there. He has starred in movies such as Hart's War, Re-Kill, Mean Machine, Remainder and Star Wars: The Force Awakens as Colonel Datoo. He has also appeared on several television programmes in both guest roles and starring roles, including Family Affairs, Casualty, Band of Brothers, Rome, Holby City (as registrar Ed Keating), Dalziel and Pascoe (BBC TV series), Law & Order: UK, Waking the Dead (BBC TV series), Silk (BBC TV series), Bostock's Cup and The Bill.

He has also appeared in many plays, varying from fringe productions to the West End. These include: Piaf, Faustus, Macbeth, Rabbit, Realism, The Love Girl and the Innocent.

In 2014, Marshall appeared in Emmerdale as the recurring character DI Bails, a police officer intent on jailing Charity Dingle for her various crimes. He reappeared in 2018.

In 2015, Marshall appeared in series 3 of popular ITV period drama Mr Selfridge as DI Perkiss. From 2016 Marshall appeared in The Royals for 3 seasons as head of security James Hill. He also appeared in A Confession for ITV in 2019.

== Filmography ==
Year	Title	Role	Notes
1997	Clancy's Kitchen	Jamie	
2001	Band of Brothers	Earl McClung	
2001	Mean Machine	Cigs	
2002	Hart's War	Capt. Robert M. Swann	
2009	Mr. Right	William	
2014	Montana	DC Liam West	
2014-2015, 2018	Emmerdale	DI Mark Bails	
2015	Remainder	Dom	
2015	Re-Kill	Langford	
2015	Star Wars: The Force Awakens	Colonel Datoo	
