= Ian Aspinall =

British actor

Ian Aspinall (born 1961) is a British actor. He played Mubbs Hussein in Holby City from 2001 to 2005, and has also appeared in City Central, The Bill, Silent Witness, Peak Practice, Waterloo Road and Casualty. He also had another role in East Is East playing eldest son Nazir Khan. He was also the first actor to portray Darren Whateley, the man responsible for the stabbing of Brian Tilsley in Coronation Street. Aspinall was born in Bolton, Lancashire.
