= Colette Brown =

English actress

- Born: 1969 (age 56–57); Clapham, South London, United Kingdom
- Occupation: actress
- Years active: 1991 - present

Colette Brown is an English actress. Brown was born in Clapham, London, c. 1969. Her mother was a hairdresser and her father was an artist. Brown worked as a receptionist for a doctor while studying for her A levels. She posed for the 1987 Pirelli calendar, photographed by Terence Donovan.

In 1994, she was a presenter of the children's television series Hangar 17. She had a minor role in the film Blue Juice (1995).

Brown appeared in "Paying the Price", an episode of the ITV drama A Touch of Frost, in 1996, as police officer Claire Toms who works on a kidnapping case with Detective Inspector Frost. The reviewer for The Sunday Telegraph wrote that Toms not being a recurring character was "a sad loss". Brown's other television credits include Casualty, Alice MacDonald in Our Friends in the North (Ep. 8, "1987"),, the BBC One daytime soap Doctors and the Doctor Who spinoff Torchwood.

Colette played Samantha Kennedy in the BBC medical drama Holby City, Michelle Connor in The Bill (S13 E140) and Della in Desmond's, S6 E10.

Brown was Kirsty Maine in the horror drama Ultraviolet (1998). She played Julie Hill in the first series of Sunburn (1999), a drama about a group of British holiday reps. She also had a role in the film Popcorn (2007).

Brown found out when she was 13 that she was dyslexic. She has a son with actor Gary Love. As of 2002, she was a patron of the Prader–Willi syndrome Association, and appeared in a BBC Inside Out documentary discussing her sister who had the syndrome.
