= Verona Joseph =

British actress (born 1974)

- Born: 23 April 1974 (age 52)
- Occupation: Actress
- Years active: 2002–present
- Television: Holby City (2002–2014); Strictly Come Dancing (2004); Doctor Who (2008)
- Spouse: Farren Blackburn (m. 2004)
- Children: 3

Verona Joseph (born 23 April 1974) is a British actress. She played the role of Jess Griffin in the BBC drama series Holby City between 2002 and 2007 and continued to appear as a recurring character from time to time until 2014. In 2004, she appeared in the first series of the BBC dancing competition Strictly Come Dancing with her professional dance partner Paul Killick. She appeared in the first episode of series four of Doctor Who as Penny Carter, a journalist.

== Personal life ==
Joseph married director Farren Blackburn in 2004. She has a son, Terrell, and two daughters, Elsie-Mae and Ruby Rose.

Joseph has dyslexia.
