= George Irving (English actor) =

English actor

- Born: 6 May 1950 (age 75); South Shields, County Durham, England
- Occupation: Actor
- Spouse: Jan Sargent (1978 – present)
- Children: Lucy Irving

George Irving (born 6 May 1950) is an English actor known for playing Anton Meyer in Holby City from 1999 to 2002. He previously had a regular role as DI Ken Jackson in the first two series of Dangerfield (1995). He has also been in The Sweeney, The Professionals, Shoestring, Juliet Bravo, Bergerac, Dempsey and Makepeace, EastEnders, Inspector Morse, Peak Practice, The Bill, Cadfael, Casualty, Dalziel and Pascoe and Doctors.

== Accomplishments ==
In 2006, Irving starred in Daniel Mulloy's BAFTA Award winning short film Antonio's Breakfast.

In 2006, he toured in John Fowles' The French Lieutenant's Woman.

In May–June 2007, Irving starred in Conor McPherson's Shining City at the Octagon Theatre, Bolton. His portrayal of John in earned him a nomination for Best Actor in the Manchester Evening News Theatre Awards.

In 2008, Irving guest starred in the historical drama The Tudors as William Kingston for the final two episodes in season two.

Irving starred in Howard Barker's The Dying of Today at the Arcola Theatre in London in November 2008 with Duncan Bell.

In autumn 2009, he returned to the Octagon Theatre, Bolton and starred in David Thacker's first two productions, in his new role as artistic director: Arthur Miller's All My Sons and Henrik Ibsen's Ghosts.

In 2010, Irving played Sean Jackson in an improvised play based on documentary interviews with real orchestral players, conductors and managers, devised, directed and produced by Rosie Boulton. The Orchestra was broadcast on 23 July 2010 as part of The Afternoon Play series on BBC Radio 4.

Also in 2010, he played the part of Mr Georgeson, a headmaster, in the Moving On episode "Losing My Religion".
