= Characters of Holby City =

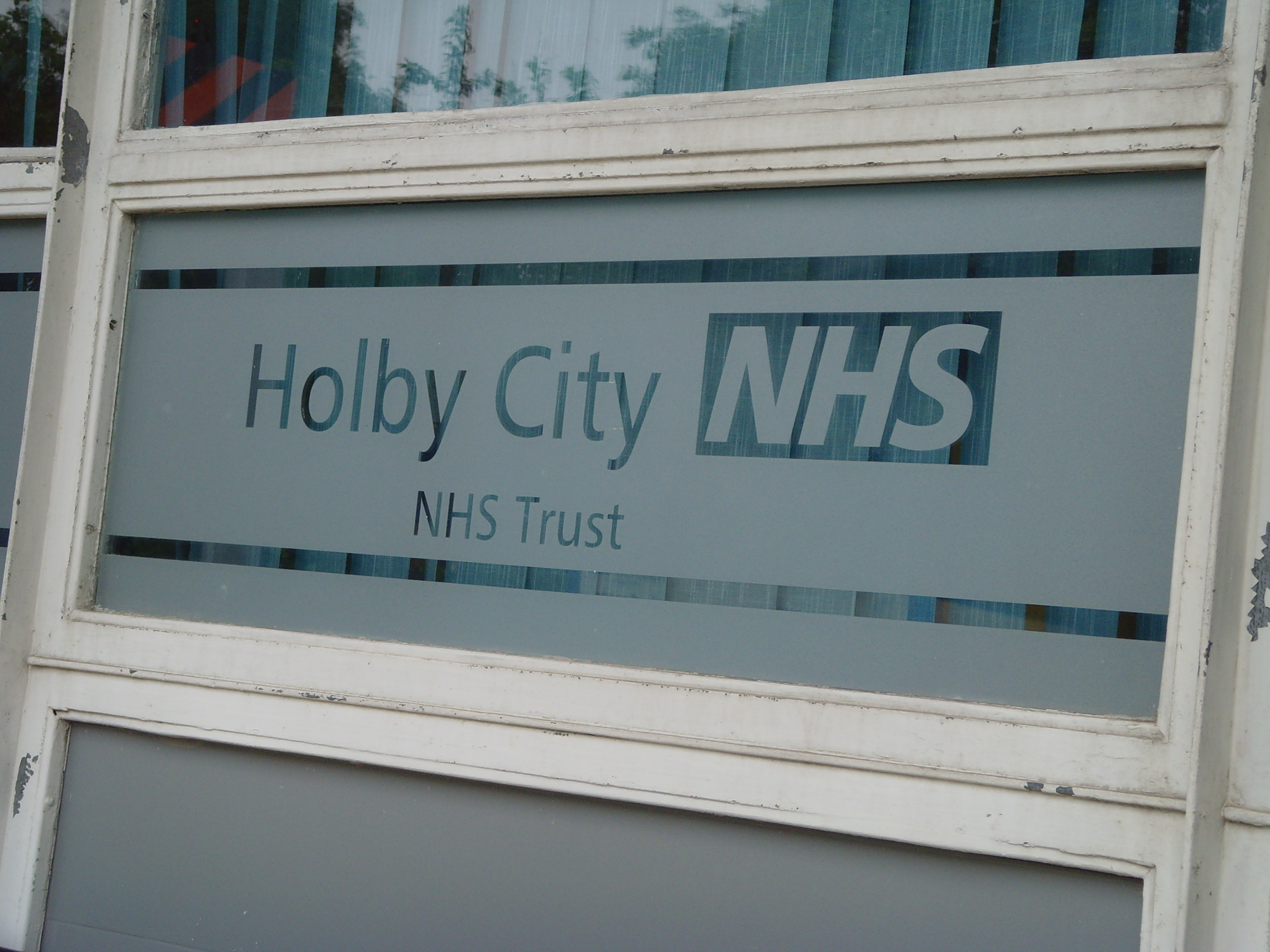
The Holby City hospital set, at BBC Elstree Centre in Borehamwood.

Holby City is a British medical drama television series that premiered on 12 January 1999 on BBC One. The series was created by Tony McHale and Mal Young as a spin-off from the established BBC medical drama Casualty. It is set in the same hospital as Casualty, Holby General, in the fictional city of Holby, and features occasional crossovers of characters and plots with both Casualty (in episodes broadcast as Casualty@Holby City) and the show's 2007 police procedural spin-off HolbyBlue.

Holby City follows the professional and personal lives of surgeons, nurses, other medical and ancillary staff and patients at Holby General. It features an ensemble cast of regular characters, and began with 11 main characters in its first series, all of whom have since left the show. New main characters have been both written in and out of the series since. In addition, Holby City features guest stars each week, as well as recurring guests that take part in story arcs that span a portion of a series. Occasionally, the recurring guest storylines will span multiple series. Many actors in the series have made prior, minor appearances as both patients and staff members in both Holby City and Casualty – in some instances crediting these former appearances for their later casting as main characters in Holby City.

== Casting ==
In casting the first series of Holby City, Young selected actors who were already established names in the acting industry, primarily from a soap opera background. He cast Michael French as Nick Jordan, George Irving as Anton Meyer, Angela Griffin as Jasmine Hopkins, Lisa Faulkner as Victoria Merrick and Nicola Stephenson as Julie Bradford. Young explained: "Soap actors are the best actors. There's been so much snobbery before. The whole thing about typecasting was probably invented by actors who couldn't get other work. From day one I knew I wanted to put on screen people that viewers want to watch. There's no downside to that." This propensity for hiring established actors continued as the soap progressed, with later roles being awarded to comedian Adrian Edmondson, Patsy Kensit and veteran actor Robert Powell. When Jane Asher was cast in the recurring role of Lady Byrne in 2007, Inside Soap magazine asked series producer Diane Kyle whether the production team intentionally sought out "well-known-names", or whether roles simply went to the actor best-suited for the part. Kyle responded: "It's lovely when we have a new member of the cast come in and bring an audience with them. But we want the best actors, and the star names we cast are always the best – which is why we go for them."

Many cast members who play main characters have made previous appearances in Holby City and Casualty in minor roles. Amanda Mealing, who plays cardiothoracic consultant Connie Beauchamp, appeared as the mother of a paediatric patient in the show's fourth series. Luke Roberts, who plays registrar Joseph Byrne, appeared as the son of a medical professor in Holby City's seventh series, Rosie Marcel, who plays registrar Jac Naylor appeared in both Holby City and Casualty as a patient on three occasions. Stella Gonet, who plays CEO Jayne Grayson, had a minor role as an anaesthetist in Casualty, while Hari Dhillon, who plays general surgical consultant Michael Spence, previously appeared as a recurring anaesthetist in Holby City. In some instances, actors have stated that it was their guest appearances which led to their casting in more permanent roles. Roberts believes that his single scene in series seven was enough for him to be called in for the part of Joseph, explaining: "I hear it got the attention of the producers. Amanda Mealing put a good word in for me that day as well." Conversely, Dhillon dismissed his minor role as Dr Sunil Gupta as a part he took immediately after leaving drama school, unable to even recall the year of his appearance.

== Main characters ==
=== A ===
==== Alex Adams ====
Jeremy Sheffield plays Alex Adams, a cardiothoracic registrar and a protege of Anton Meyer. He appears from series three, episode one until series five, episode 45. A romance with SHO Sam Kennedy almost ends his career, when Sam gets him drunk in an attempt to lure him into spending the night with her. Unaware he is over the speed limit, Alex causes the death of a young boy due to drink driving. He escapes a jail sentence, but departs for America when Meyer accepts a position overseas. He later returns and has a brief romance with Jess Griffin, as a result of which she becomes pregnant, but opts for an abortion. Alex goes on to develop Parkinson's disease, affecting his ability to work. He comes close to attempting suicide, but is talked out of it by Diane Lloyd, after which he leaves Holby for good.

==== Daisha Anderson ====
Rebecca Grant plays nurse Daisha Anderson, who first appears in the episode "Twelve Hour Nightmare", series ten, episode 24. Daisha is described by the BBC as "a forthright and assertive Filipina with a highly tuned sense of right and wrong. She doesn't understand hierarchy or tact but is straightforward and honest and has a natural antenna when it comes to flirting." Holby City was Grant's first television role. She explained of her introductory storyline: "Some characters get a huge introduction, but mine has a 'flow' to it." Daisha's first appearance in Holby City explains that, although the character has been working at Holby City Hospital for some time in order to financially support her family in the Philippines, she has previously only worked on the Orthopedic ward – not one of the four wards the show focuses on. Daisha forms a close friendship with nursing consultant Mark Williams (Robert Powell). She flirts with Mark in order to win a transfer to Darwin ward, and moves in with him after breaking up with her boyfriend and being assaulted by her landlord, coming to rely on him yet further upon discovering herself to be pregnant. Mark also aids Daisha in becoming ambassador of the Byrne Foundation for cardiothoracic care, and promotes her to Sister of Keller ward, leading some to question the true nature of their relationship.

==== Stan Ashleigh ====
Paul Shane plays Stan Ashleigh, a porter who appears in Holby City from series three, episode one to series six, episode two.

=== B ===
==== Tash Bandara ====
Thusitha Jayasundera plays Tash Bandara, a general surgical registrar of Indian heritage who appears from series two, episode five until series four, episode 37. Tash had a relationship with SHO Kirstie Collins prior to her arrival at Holby. She clashes with nurse practitioner Jasmine Hopkins, disparaging her position in the hospital. When Tash's father visits the hospital, she discovers he has Alzheimer's disease. She tells him she is a lesbian, and he refuses to accept her identity. When Tash's ex-girlfriend arrives, terminally ill from complications arising from AIDS, Tash decides to join her on a world tour, and departs from Holby.

==== Rachel Baptiste ====
Ayesha Antoine plays Rachel Baptiste, who appears from series eleven, episode six as a staff nurse on the general surgery ward, Keller. Antoine had formerly appeared in Holby City series seven, episode five, as Mel Allen, the relative of a patient. She described her character upon her introduction as "quite nervous, but very excited", expanding that: "She loves her job, caring for people and being helpful. She is at the beginning of a new stage in her life, and it's quite an upturn for her, and she's just very interested in getting to know everyone and is excited at being part of a group." The BBC describe Rachel as: "warm and kind but perhaps a little too trusting. She's anxious to please. She loves nursing but her real passion is her boyfriend, Patrick." Antoine received just a thumbnail sketch of Rachel's background, but commented that: "I love it. Give me a bit of spare time and I'll tell you what my character did age four and a half – whether it's a lot or a little, it's all good." During Holby City's eleventh series, Rachel uncovers Daisha Anderson's post-natal depression and helps to support her, before being transferred to the hospital's geriatric ward. Executive producer Tony McHale commented on Rachel's transfer: "Although she is still working in the hospital, we are not likely to see her on our regular wards for some time." Rachel is of Afrocaribbean heritage.

==== Mike Barratt ====
Clive Mantle plays Mike Barratt, a consultant general surgeon who previously appeared in Casualty practising emergency medicine. He appears in Holby City from series two, episode five until series three, episode 30, working on the hospital's Keller ward. At the end of the second series, Mike severely damages his leg after stepping on a poacher's trap and rolling hundreds of feet down a hill on a team building course. He recovers, and returns to work on crutches. At the end of the third series he is offered a job in New Zealand, which he refuses, although he does not return for the fourth series.

==== Connie Beauchamp ====
Amanda Mealing plays Connie Beauchamp, a consultant cardiothoracic surgeon on Holby General's Darwin ward. Connie first appears in the series six episode "In at the Deep End", She is initially portrayed as a married man-eater, engaging in extra-marital trysts with Ric Griffin and registrars Mubbs Hussein and Will Curtis, though goes on to become a loving mother to her daughter, Grace, fathered by surgical registrar Sam Strachan. Connie was briefly written out of the series in 2007 to allow Mealing time out to work on separate projects, but returned to the show at the end of the year in the series ten episode "Elliot's Wonderful Life". She departs the show in "Snow Queens". Holby City. Season 13. Episode 11. 28 December 2010. BBC. BBC One. Connie later joined Holby City's sister show Casualty, arriving on 29 March 2014 as a new consultant and deputy clinical lead.

==== Julie Bradford ====
Nicola Stephenson plays Julie Bradford, an original character who appears until series three, episode 29. Julie is a single mother with mounting debts. When she is passed over for promotion to deputy ward sister, she resorts to lap dancing at night to care for her daughter. Her alter ego Crystal is exposed when a member of the lap dancing club is admitted to Holby General as a patient and recognises her. Julie is reprimanded, but is given a temporary promotion to help with her financial circumstances. During series two, Julie embarks on a relationship with one of the builders renovating the hospital, but he breaks up with her when he learns she has a child. When her ex-husband Martin arrives and begs Julie to give their relationship another chance, she agrees. They remarry, and leave Holby to start a new life with their daughter in Brighton.

==== Jasmine Burrows ====
Jasmine Burrows, played by Lucinda Dryzek, made her first appearance during the eighteenth series episode "A Perfect Life", broadcast on 19 July 2016. Jasmine is a new F1 and the half-sister of established regular Jac Naylor (Rosie Marcel). She was also a potential love interest for Oliver Valentine (James Anderson). The character was killed off in the episode broadcast on 20 June 2017.

==== Joseph Byrne ====
Luke Roberts played Joseph Byrne, a cardiothoracic surgical registrar introduced in the series eight episode "A Mother's Love". Roberts had made a former appearance in the show's seventh series as a minor character, and attributes this prior role to his eventual casting as Joseph. His major storylines have included an accidental drugs overdose, a relationship with fellow surgical registrar Jac Naylor, who cheated on him with his own father, and a relationship with the show's "black widow" character, Ward Sister Faye Morton. Roberts' portrayal of the role saw him longlisted for the "Most Popular Newcomer" award at the 2006 National Television Awards.

=== C ===
==== Edward Campbell ====
Edward Campbell, played by Aden Gillett, made his first appearance in the fifteenth series episode "Never Let Me Go", broadcast on 30 July 2013. Gillett's casting was announced on 6 April. The actor stated, "I'm looking forward to joining the cast of Holby. I've worked with Catherine, Guy [Henry] and Hugh [Quarshie] before, and it will be a pleasure to work with them again." Executive producer Oliver Kent commented that Gillett's character would "stir things up" for Serena Campbell (Catherine Russell). Edward is Serena's ex-husband and a consultant anaesthetist, who comes to the hospital to take up a locum position on AAU. He also takes the opportunity to try and win Serena over. Russell told a What's on TV reporter that Serena and Edward had an acrimonious divorce around 15 years prior, due to his infidelity. Serena and Edward reunite, and decide to go on holiday with their daughter for Christmas. However, Serena soon learned that Edward was an alcoholic and had been having an affair with nurse Mary-Claire Carter (Niamh McGrady).

A Daily Record reporter observed that Serena was "not at all happy to see him". While a Liverpool Echo reporter observed: "new doctor Edward is a figure from Serena's past, which threatens to compromise her personal and professional lives".

==== Serena Campbell ====
Serena Campbell, played by Catherine Russell, is a consultant general surgeon Clinical Lead. She made her first appearance in the fourteenth series episode "Coercion", broadcast on 1 May 2012. The show's official website describes Serena as being candid, professional and a "fearless architect of change." Serena was recruited by Henrik Hanssen (Guy Henry) to help the wards run more efficiently. She immediately clashed with new colleague Ric Griffin (Hugh Quarshie).

==== Tom Campbell-Gore ====
Tom Campbell-Gore, played by Denis Lawson, is a consultant cardiothoracic surgeon, who made his first appearance in the series four episode "New Hearts, Old Scores", broadcast on 13 August 2002. Lawson described his character as "a complex guy who is ruthless, political and driven by ambition". Lawson quit the serial in 2004, and he departed during the sixth series. Lawson reprised the role for the show's 20th anniversary celebrations. He appeared in two episodes, with the first airing on 2 January 2019. Lawson commented, "I have great memories of my time on Holby City and I'm delighted to be back on my old stomping ground with the Holby cast and crew". Tom is reacquainted with Ric Griffin (Hugh Quarshie) at the Innovation Conference, where they are rivals for funding.

==== Mary-Claire Carter ====
Niamh McGrady plays staff nurse Mary-Claire Carter. Initially a recurring character, she first appeared 22 September 2009. She became a main cast member in 2011. Mary-Claire often has difficulties in her relationships, be they personal or professional. Although a very capable and caring nurse, it does not often show with several consultants questioning her ability and commitment. She was close to Chrissie Williams until her departure and after a failed relationship has bonded with CT2 Harry Tressler.

Mary-Claire is often considered blunt, lazy and insensitive, while also lacking in diplomatic skills. However, many fans believe if you scratch at the surface you'll find a lonely girl, with a heart of gold, who is desperate to find 'the one'.

==== Lofty Chiltern ====
Lee Mead plays nurse Ben "Lofty" Chiltern, a nurse who previously appeared in Casualty. He will appear in Holby City from series nineteen, working on the hospital's Keller ward. Upon the character's introduction, it was teased the character could be "running away from his problems". Mead said he was "looking forward to being in a new part of the Holby hospital and seeing what it has in store for [Lofty] next." The show's acting executive producer, Simon Harper, said it was "thrilling" to introduce Mead to Holby City. He added, "Keller Ward is going through some dark times, so Lofty's trademark warmth and kindness will come at just the right moment."

==== Meena Chowdhury ====
Meena Chowdhury, played by Salma Hoque, made her first appearance in the sixty-third episode of series 19. The character and Salma Hoque's casting details were announced on 29 September 2017, alongside those of Belinda Owusu who plays Nicky McKendrick, Meena's best friend from school. Meena is an F1. In her fictional backstory, she had a privileged upbringing, whereas Nicky is working class. Meena's friendship with Nicky is tested, as they try to impress Jac Naylor (Rosie Marcel) during their rotation.

==== Dan Clifford ====
Peter Wingfield plays Dan Clifford, a general surgical consultant who first appears in series nine, episode seven, "It's Been a Long Day". Dan is described as: "sexist, materialistic and egotistical but also incredibly charismatic", and engages in several romantic relationships during his single season on the show. He arrives having left his third fiancé at the altar, and goes on to develop feelings for both SHO Maddy Young, and his sister-in-law Louise. Of Dan's relationship with Maddy, Wingfield explained: "There was a line in one of the last episodes, 'one of them seems perfect for you' and I always thought that summed it up. Dan and Maddy have always been incredibly close without becoming lovers, but it is obvious that they are great together, so when it happens it is effortless and joyous and has wonderful potential. But Dan's private demons prevent it from being allowed to live and grow. I always thought it might be great for him, if only he could have let it be." Similarly, Nadine Lewington who plays Maddy assessed: "Dan loved Maddy sincerely which is why he didn't want to risk hurting her any more than he already had. He was too messed up to be good for anyone and he knew it."

Wingfield describes Dan as "decisive, quick-thinking and pragmatic", explaining that "he doesn't allow emotion to control his choices". He says of his reception: "People really responded to the character. He had such a roguishness and a wildness and you never quite knew what he might do or say next and I think that was exciting for people." Dan leaves Holby in series ten episode two "The Last Throw" to accept a prestigious job in France, though reappears briefly in episode "Love Will Tear Us Apart", arranging a meeting with Maddy but ultimately standing her up. He reappears again in Holby City's eleventh series, and although Wingfield left the show in order to spend more time with his family in Los Angeles, he has stated that he would return again "in a heartbeat". He explained: "The story would have to be good, but I don't have any doubts that there is much more to explore and more fun to be had with Dan."

==== Kirstie Collins ====
Dawn McDaniel plays Kirstie Collins, an original character who appears until series three, episode six as a cardiology registrar. Kirstie flirts with many of the staff, including nurse Danny Shaughnessy. In the second series, it is revealed that Kirstie had previously had a lesbian relationship with registrar Tash Bandara. Kirstie's father, who she has been estranged from for six years, is admitted to the hospital with a damaged liver after years of alcohol abuse. Kirstie agrees to see him and urges him to seek help. She leaves the hospital after undertaking a dangerous rescue.

==== Dominic Copeland ====
David Ames plays Clinical Registrar Dominic Copeland who first appears on 23 April 2013. Coming over as friendly and very capable, he makes a good impression on both colleagues and patients. He strikes up a close professional relationship with Malick and the two have a steamy encounter in the locker room and it turns out they spent the night together. However, things turn sour when Malick makes it clear it was just a one-night stand that should never have happened given his role as Dominic's line manager. Dominic does not take this at all well. The story concludes with a controversial patient where Malick risks his career by trying to get answers for a grieving mother. The patient dies and Dominic deliberately lies in a hearing as revenge for Malick's snubbing of him. The truth is revealed and Malick manages to save his career, mainly due to the intervention of Hanssen. Disgraced, Dominic leaves the hospital. However, on 14 January 2014, Dominic returns following being cleared of any wrongdoing. He does, however, have to repeat his F1 year. Arthur, having been a close ally of Malick's, is not at all happy to see him back. Dominic does his best to make peace with Arthur but to little avail. He strikes up a friendship with Zosia and moves into Arthur and Zosia's flat, much to Arthur's disgust.

Dominic experiences a profound character development throughout the show. He has experienced many difficult storylines. For example, he was abused emotionally and physically by his ex-partner Isaac Mayfield.

==== Imelda Cousins ====
Imelda Cousins, played by Tessa Peake-Jones, made her first appearance during the fifteenth series episode "Hail Caesar", broadcast on 20 November 2012. The character and casting were announced on 30 October 2012. Imelda was introduced as the Acting CEO of Holby City Hospital, following the abrupt departure of Henrik Hanssen (Guy Henry).

==== Linden Cullen ====
Duncan Pow plays Linden Cullen, the head of Holby General's Acute Assessment Unit, introduced in series ten, episode 14, "Stolen". Linden is motivated by his strong Catholicism, admitting in confessional to feeling he has betrayed his dead wife Olivia by developing romantic feelings for Ward Sister Faye Morton, after he and registrar Joseph Byrne track her down in a special episode set on location in Cape Town. He reveals that Olivia was killed in a car crash, for which he blames himself, and that he has a daughter, Holly, who reminds him of Olivia to the extent that he cannot bear to see her, so is being raised by Olivia's parents instead of him. A long-running series ten plot strand sees Linden become deeply involved with the plight of a pair of Korean asylum seekers, one of whom is pregnant with conjoined twins. As the couple are Christian, he feels compelled by his faith to help them, and ensures that the hospital hosts the twins' separation operation, despite political red-tape. Linden is hit over the head with a bottle and killed in the grounds of the hospital while trying to stop Faye being attacked by a drug addict.

==== Will Curtis ====
Noah Huntley plays Will Curtis, a cardiothoracic surgical registrar who appears between series six, episode 29 and series seven, episode 25. Will is killed when scaffolding being used to do work on the outside of the hospital collapses and he is trapped under it eventually dying from his injuries.

=== D ===
==== Owen Davis ====
Mark Moraghan plays Owen Davis, a consultant obstetrician who appears between series four, episode three and series eight, episode ten. Early on, it is revealed that he is the ex-lover of Darwin's new ward sister, Chrissie Williams. Their affair broke up his marriage to his wife, Laura, with whom he has a daughter, Katie. Initially, he and Chrissie are not on good terms, and he chastises her for her affair with Alistair Taylor, especially since Owen is overseeing Alistair's wife's IVF treatment. He and Chrissie eventually bury the hatchet on their affair, just as his daughter falls dangerously ill. Owen and Laura decide to give their marriage another go after Katie nearly dies, but Owen can not let go of Chrissie, and they begin another affair, which is later witnessed by Katie, who innocently spills the beans to her mother. An outraged and humiliated Laura ends the marriage for good. Owen and Chrissie decide to pursue a proper relationship and eventually marry. Owen is devastated when he learns that Chrissie has cheated on him with Darwin's registrar, Ed Keating and that the child she is carrying may not be his. Chrissie's pregnancy proves difficult, resulting in her needing an emergency caesarean section, which Chrissie begs Owen to perform. She gives birth to a little girl called Amanda, who dies shortly after her birth. Despite his attraction to Chrissie, Owen can't get past her affair with Ed and rebounds onto Diane Loyd. Seeing her as a chance for a fresh start, he proposes, and they later marry. But not before Owen has another night of passion with Chrissie, who is determined to win him back. They eventually resume their affair, which culminates in Owen leaving Diane. Their reunion is short-lived, as Laura is admitted to the hospital after a car accident. She later collapses and dies of a brain bleed, leaving Owen to raise their young daughter, Katie. Realising his lust for Chrissie makes him blind to everyone else he cares for, Owen decides to put his daughter before himself, breaks things off with Chrissie and moves away from Holby.

==== Arthur Digby ====
Rob Ostlere plays Arthur Digby, an F2 who first appeared in "Blood ties" but arrived on Darwin in "Push the Button, Part 2" as an F1. Arthur slowly began to realize he had unknown feelings for Chantelle which he finally declared was love, but during episode 51 of Series 15, Arthur paid the price for his love, as he got distracted behind the wheel while trying to tell Chantelle he loved her causing to crash his car. After her recovery, Arthur finally told her he loved her, but he was left crying when Chantelle decided one of them had to move on. Arthur is diagnosed with stomach cancer and later dies in "I'll Walk You Home", broadcast on 7 June 2016.

==== Raf di Lucca ====
Joe McFadden portrays general surgical registrar Raffaello "Raf" di Lucca. By his own admission, his passion lies with CPR routines, protocols and development. He first appears in on 28 January 2014 and instantly makes an impression on Ric and Guy after bringing his lunch and shoes to an interview after assuming they would want him to start. He comes over as confident bordering on arrogant. He upsets Harry when he criticises his CPR abilities and attitude. He also clashes with Adele and confiscates her mobile phone after catching her using it.

==== Greg Douglas ====
Edward MacLiam plays Greg Douglas, a registrar in cardiothoracic surgery who first appears in series twelve, working for Connie Beauchamp in London. He follows her back to Holby and begins working on Darwin ward, mentoring F2 doctor Oliver Valentine.

==== Abra Durant ====
Adrian Edmondson plays Abra Durant, a consultant surgeon who first appears in the series seven episode "Tuesday's Child", filmed entirely on location in Ghana as part of the BBC's "Africa Lives" season. While the role was created for Edmondson as a one-off guest-appearance, he has since reprised the role of Abra six times, stating that he has loved the show since its 1999 conception. Abra's initial role in the show is that of Third World rights champion and humorous surgical maverick, whose major storylines centre around serious rule breaking, and his relationship with colleague Kyla Tyson. Upon returning to the show in series eleven, the character takes a darker turn, resorting to self-harm as a symptom of post-traumatic stress, following a harrowing experience in the war torn Congo. Abra returns to Africa after seeking psychiatric help, and makes his final appearance soon thereafter, returning briefly to Holby in an attempt to convince Kyla to move to Ghana with him.

==== Xavier Duval ====
Xavier "Zav" Duval, played by Marcus Griffiths, made his first appearance in the twentieth series episode "Hard Day's Night", broadcast on 20 February 2018. Xavier is a general surgical registrar. Griffiths described his character as "very confident and charming", as well as an "alpha male". The actor said he shared some similarities with Xavier, such as their ambitious sides, but Griffiths thought he was more empathetic. He also thought Xavier was a "Marmite" character, who viewers would either like or hate. Xavier clashes with co-worker Nicky McKendrick (Belinda Owusu) after they both get drunk at the local bar, while he has a casual relationship with her friend Meena Chowdhury (Salma Hoque). In April 2018, Griffiths starred in one episode of Holby City's sister show, Casualty, as Xavier. Griffiths made another appearance in Casualty as part of a two-part crossover episode, originally broadcast in March 2019. For his portrayl of Xavier, Griffiths was nominated for Best Soap Newcomer at the 2018 Digital Spy Reader Awards. He came in ninth place, receiving 3% of the total votes.

Zav was written out of the show and he made his final appearance on 14 April 2020. Zav's final scenes featured him discovering Cameron Dunn's (Nic Jackman) secrets about the death of Evan Crowhurst (Jack Ryder). He decides to go to the police but is knocked over by a cyclist and killed. Griffiths had to keep Zav's departure a secret to shock viewers, which he found difficult. He told Sophie Dainty from Digital Spy that he was happy with his exit story because it was memorable. He added "I am all about arc; about where people start and where people finish. Zav came in as someone who was so over-confident and not always good with understanding other people and not always getting it right. But then he ended up dying trying to do the right thing."

=== E ===
==== Adele Effanga ====
Petra Letang plays healthcare assistant Adele Effanga and made her first appearance in series 16 on 14 January 2014. Adele is the younger sister of Mo Effanga (Chizzy Akudolu). Adele is the show's first regular healthcare assistant and series producer Simon Harper described her as being "funny, sassy and streetwise". He added that while Mo loves her sister, she is not very happy to have her working at the same hospital.

==== Mo Effanga ====
Chizzy Akudolu plays specialist registrar Mo Effanga, who has been on the show since 22 May 2012. Mo is a comedic character but has also been involved in many big storylines, for example when she was giving birth to a baby for a friend. On her arrival, a BBC spokesperson dubbed her Disorganised and chaotic in her personal life, if there's a disastrous man on the horizon, she'll find him. She was nominated for "Best Newcomer" at the Black International Film Festival and Music.

==== Liam Evans ====
Adrian Lewis Morgan plays nurse Liam Evans, who appears from series three, episode 15 until series four, episode 35. Liam originally works on Keller ward as an agency nurse. He plans to leave the hospital to get married and move to Australia, but when he is jilted on his wedding day, he applies for a permanent position. When Liam overhears his neighbours arguing, he intervenes in an instance of domestic violence and is pushed off a balcony. He is left paralysed from the waist down, and becomes depressed, feeling unable to cope. When his ex-fiancée returns to Holby, she and Liam reconcile and move to Australia.

=== F ===
==== Adrian "Fletch" Fletcher ====
Adrian "Fletch" Fletcher, played by Alex Walkinshaw, made his first appearance during the sixteenth series episode "Star Crossed Lover", broadcast on 12 August 2014. Fletch previously appeared in Holby City's sister show, Casualty, as a staff nurse between 2012 and 2014. It was announced on 1 April 2014 that Walkinshaw would leave Casualty and join Holby City. He has a connection with Director of Nursing Colette Sheward (Louise Delamere).

==== Damon Ford ====
David Ajao plays Damon Ford, a foundation doctor in his first year of training. He made his first appearance in the nineteenth series episode "The Hard Way Home", broadcast on 6 June 2017. Damon is billed as "boyishly enthusiastic". Executive producer Simon Harper called Ajao "a really exciting new talent" and said that he has injected "energy and idealism" into the character. Ajao left the role in 2017 and Damon made his final appearance in the nineteenth series episode "Hungry Heart", broadcast on 21 November 2017.

==== Lisa Fox ====
Luisa Bradshaw-White plays Lisa Fox, who first appears in Holby City in series four, episode 13, "Shadow of a Doubt (Part 1)", as a midwife on the hospital's maternity ward. She later goes on to become sister of the Acute Assessment Unit, then clinical matron of Keller, the hospital's general surgical ward. Following her departure from the show, the official series website described Lisa as: "ambitious, highly capable at her job and did not suffer fools gladly. However, she sometimes took herself too seriously and was afraid to let her hair down. She had a determined nature and while she could cause friction, she was genuine and honest." Her major storylines revolve around her advancing career, an on-off relationship with colleague Mubbs Hussein, and her father's death by assisted suicide. Lisa also appears in the Casualty@Holby City interactive episode "Something We Can Do". Upon announcing her forthcoming departure from the show on 8 June 2005, BBC Publicity commented: "The character of Lisa has been wonderful in the show and she has always had a huge sense of fun and adventure. So in the months to come we will see her unable to resist the challenge of working in a setting very different from Holby City Hospital." In her final appearance, series 7, episode 48 "Great Expectations", Lisa decides to leave Holby with surgeon Abra Durant and relocate to work with him in Ghana. Although the character had only recently embarked on a new relationship with Mubbs, Bradshaw-White explained: "When he does finally declare his undying love for her and asks to move in with him, Lisa realises it isn't what she wants at all." She expanded that "Lisa's waited so long to hear those words, but she's annoyed to discover he assumed she'd jump at the chance [to move in with him]." She stated that she was "pleased it's a positive ending for [Lisa] as she's been so miserable", and explained that her motivation for leaving Holby City was "Purely because I've been in it four years. I've loved every second here and I probably stayed a year longer than I wanted to, just because I loved it so much."

==== Kath Fox ====
Jan Pearson plays ward sister Kath Fox between series two episode one and series six episode 26. Kath is the mother of nurse Danny Shaughnessy, and during her early years on the show escapes a violent marriage marred by domestic abuse to Danny's father. Her Christian faith is a strong element of her character, and she struggles emotionally when the hospital's Father Michal develops romantic feelings towards her. She rejects his advances, and he responds by attempting suicide. Later, she falls in love with and marries Terry Fox, father of midwife Lisa Fox. Terry has cancer, and later kills himself. Kath is accused of aiding him in euthanasia by Lisa, and is arrested and tried in court, eventually deemed to be innocent. She and Lisa do not reconcile until Kath departs from Holby, leaving the country with her most recent love interest.

=== G ===
==== John Gaskell ====
Paul McGann plays Professor John Gaskell, a neurosurgeon who made his first appearance on 5 December 2017, in the nineteenth series episode "Group Animal – Part One". John is billed as a "surgical star with irrepressible charm", who will take the hospital into "an exciting but unknown future" with a new surgical programme. McGann began filming in August 2016. Of his casting, McGann said, "I'm really excited to be joining Holby. Professor John Gaskell is certainly going to be an interesting character and I can't wait to get started on the wards." Head of Continuing Drama for BBC Scripted Studios, Oliver Kent, expressed his delight at the casting of McGann and described him joining the show as "a dream come true". He added, "John Gaskell will be a mercurial force to be reckoned with and I can't wait to see him locking horns with Jac, Hanssen, Griffin and the other Holby titans."

Toby Geddes

Rick Warden plays Toby Geddes, a consultant cardiothoracic surgeon briefly on Darwin ward in 2010 brought in by Michael Spence as a replacement for Connie Beauchamp. Geddes, despite being a capable surgeon, often comes across as being patronising, sexist and rude to his colleagues, especially Elliot Hope, who eventually has an outburst whilst operating with Geddes, becoming infuriated with offensive comments made by Geddes. It is implied that Geddes sees himself as something as a ladies man, making flirtuatious comments to and about female surgical staff including Jac Naylor and Penny Valentine. After a major incident at the hospital in Series 12's episode 'The Butterfly Effect Part 2', Toby departs the hospital and is never seen or mentioned again, having endeared himself to few people during his brief tenure at Holby.

==== Jess Griffin ====
Verona Joseph plays Jess Griffin, the daughter of consultant general surgeon Ric Griffin. Jess first appears in series 4, episode 15, becoming the personal assistant of Owen Davis. She goes on to become a nurse, and departs from the show in series 9, episode 29. She reappeared in series 13, episode 3 on 2 November 2010, married to a man named David Kilburn and is 18 weeks pregnant, and again in series 13, episode 21 on 8 March 2011. On 4 March 2014, Jess returns suffering from bad symptoms which turn out to be a hernia. It also transpires that her husband, David has been abusing her both mentally and physically. Her father pledges to do everything he can to get her away from him.

==== Lola Griffin ====
Sharon D. Clarke plays Lola Griffin, introduced in Holby City's seventh series as the two-time ex-wife of Ric Griffin, and a cardiothoracic registrar. She is quickly promoted to critical care consultant and head of the hospital's Acute Assessment Unit. However, the fast pace of the AAU combined with her "feisty, controlling" nature culminates in her being fired from the hospital and suffering a heart attack on the same day. Lola recovers following surgery, and is re-employed by the hospital, switching roles once again to become a post-operative care consultant. It has been announced that the character will depart from the show later in 2008, to allow Clarke to return to musical theatre. When Holby General's CEO Jayne Grayson is forced to make a consultant redundant, Lola is top of the list. She leaves the hospital to work as medical officer at a private psychiatric clinic. With the help of Ric, she manages to fool Jayne into doubling her redundancy package even though she has a better job to go to. On her first day, she is reunited with former colleague Abra Durant who is being treated for post traumatic stress syndrome following his time in Africa. When Abra discharges himself and decides to return to Ghana, Lola realises that the new job is not right for her, so hands in her resignation and leaves with Abra.

==== Ric Griffin ====
Hugh Quarshie plays Ric Griffin, the hospital's head of general surgery. He is portrayed as "stubborn, impulsive and self-destructive," but at the same time "noble and righteous", unafraid to fight for his principles and medical ethics. His major storylines concentrate on his gambling addiction, and his inability to find the right woman. Ric has been married six times (twice to fellow Holby doctor Lola Griffin), and has eight children and two grandchildren. He is the longest serving character on the show, having arrived at the start of Holby City's fourth series. The character was briefly written out in 2006 to allow Quarshie time off to film two episodes of BBC sci-fi series Doctor Who, but returned again to the serial in 2007.

==== Chloe Godard ====
Amy Lennox portrays Chloe Godard, a cardiothoracic registrar who first appears in the twenty-first series episode "Mad as Hell". The character and Lennox's casting was announced on 14 November 2018, alongside that of Jack Ryder, who portrays Chloe's boyfriend Evan Crowhurst. Chloe is introduced as the daughter of established character Ange Godard (Dawn Steele) who helps her mother treat a difficult patient. She is employed by a neighbouring hospital but agrees to help Ange with the patient as they share history. Lennox called Chloe a "very capable and passionate doctor" and explained that she qualified as a registrar at a young age and is completing her PhD while working. The actress opined that "certain characters will find her sickeningly good at what she does, and potentially frustrated at how gifted she is." Simon Harper, the show's executive producer, described the character as "strong yet deeply vulnerable" and a "fascinating, multi-layered character" who would lead a big story during the series.

Chloe and Ange share a complicated relationship and they do not have a good relationship upon Chloe's introduction. Contrastingly, Lennox and Steele work well together and have neighbouring dressing rooms. Lennox felt "thrilled" and "chuffed" to have her as her on-screen mother. Lennox expressed her delight at joining the cast and teased that her character would be involved in "some really great storylines". Holby City marks the actress' first regular television role, although she had guest starred in the drama's sister show, Casualty, in 2017 as a former heroin addict. To prepare for the role, the actress observed a triple heart bypass, which she found "fascinating". Harper was excited about Lennox's casting and praised her "terrific" performance as Chloe.

==== Ange Godard ====
Dawn Steele plays Ange Godard, a consultant general surgeon who first appears in the twenty-first series. The character and Steele's casting was announced on 19 September 2018. Ange arrives to establish a new unit on Keller ward and is accompanied by "explosive secrets that will send shockwaves through the hospital". Steele expressed her delight at joining the cast, commenting, "I am really looking forward to getting on that Keller Ward and bringing her to life." Sophie Dainty, reporting for Digital Spy, confirmed that Ange would be involved in some of the series' big storylines. In November 2018, it was announced that Ange's daughter, Chloe Godard (Amy Lennox), would be introduced to the drama shortly after Ange's arrival.

=== H ===
==== Dan Hamilton ====
Adam Astill plays Dan Hamilton, a consultant orthopaedic surgeon who first appears in the thirteenth series episode "Blue Valentine". Prior to his casting as Dan, Astill had wanted a role in the series for some time. Billed as charming and sometimes lacking courage, Dan begins a relationship with ward sister Chrissie Williams. Later, he develops a rivalry with registrar Antoine Malick. Dan kisses Malick during a fight, leading Dan to question his sexuality. Astill left the show in 2012, as Dan comes to terms with his sexuality and leaves Holby to follow his boyfriend Simon Marshall to Leeds General Infirmary.

==== Jeong-Soo Han ====
Chan Woo Lim plays Jeong-Soo Han, who appears from the show's twenty-second series. The character and Lim's casting details were announced on 29 October 2020. The character is created as one of three new F1 doctors (F1s) introduced following the show's four-month production break enforced by the COVID-19 pandemic. He joins the show alongside Josh Hudson (Trieve Blackwood-Cambridge) and Skylar Bryce (Phoebe Pryce). Kate Oates, the head of continuing drama at BBC Studios, described the new F1s as "exciting new characters". Jeong-Soo is characterised as a "hard-working and intelligent" doctor with "a surprisingly dry wit, quiet confidence and self-assurance about him". He will always stand up for injustice but does not seek attention. A show publicist dubbed him the Harry Potter of medical schools. However, Jeong-Soo can often be reckless in his attempts to help people, which can often be his downfall.

==== Henrik Hanssen ====
Guy Henry plays Henrik Hanssen, a consultant general surgeon and joint Director of Surgery at Holby General, who first appears in the premiere episode of the thirteenth series, "Shifts". Hanssen was sent to the hospital by the Department of Health to make budget cuts. He is presented as "punctilious, pedantic and passionate about his work", but with a dry sense of humour.

==== Sandy Harper ====
From December 2000 to September 2003, staff nurse Sandy Harper was played by Laura Sadler. On 15 June 2003, Sadler fell 40 ft (12 m) from the balcony of her boyfriend's second floor flat. Sadler never regained consciousness and died on 19 June 2003 when her life support was turned off at Charing Cross Hospital. Eight further Holby City episodes featuring Sadler as Sandy had already been filmed, and were aired as scheduled posthumously. BBC scriptwriters consulted Sadler's mother, Sonja Sadler, when devising the character's exit storyline. Mal Young said: "I went there thinking we were all going to be in tears and it turned into an unofficial storyline conference. I said we would find a way of explaining Laura's absence and her mum came up with an idea we all liked." Sandy's farewell episode, "A Friend in Need", revealed that the character had won £150,000 in the lottery, and left for Australia to follow former love interest Danny Shaughnessy. After discovering various amounts of money she had left behind for her friends at Holby City Hospital, the characters gathered together in the hospital bar at the end of the episode, and raised a toast "To the one and only Sandy!"

==== Essie Harrison ====
Estelle "Essie" Harrison (also Di Lucca) played by Kaye Wragg, made her first appearance in the sixteenth series episode "My Name Is Joe", which aired on 6 May 2014. Essie is a Staff Nurse at Holby City Hospital. She came to the hospital with her dying grandfather and she started a relationship with Sacha Levy (Bob Barrett). She later moved to Germany after her grandfather died. In October 2014, it was announced that Wragg would be returning to Holby City and she was promoted to the regular cast.

==== Mickie Hendrie ====
Kelly Adams plays Mickie Hendrie, a midwife who first appears in series six, episode 24. Mickie has a lesbian affair with Donna Jackson and goes on to become a staff nurse, before departing in series eight, episode 47 to attend medical school to become a doctor.

==== Luc Hemingway ====
Joseph Millson plays Luc Hemingway, an eccentric and extremely intelligent specialist registrar. He first appears in November 2011, episode "Under The Skin", while on the roof with Nurse Eddi McKee. His double fellowship and unsociable manner initially aggravates Eddi (Sarah Jane Potts). In the episode "Ribbons", he kisses her, but the aftermath of the kiss shows that he offered no explanation and even disappeared from the ward to focus on research to avoid her. The episodes "Unsafe Haven (Part 1 & 2)" were focused on the beginning of their relationship, brought about by Luc allowing Eddi to see a more sensitive side of him when he blames himself for the death of a friend, the security guard, and the outbreak of Legionnaires. In "Long Way Down", Eddi and Luc are shown as finally being in a relationship. Luc is offered a permanent contract, and plans to take the contract. However, the end of the episode shows that Luc has left, with no explanation. He returned in "A Crack in the Ice", for a brief period of time. After the departure of Eddi, it is shown that Luc was struggling to cope. When Luc is confronted by a patient in "Blood Ties", we find out that he was an Army Doctor in Sierra Leone. "Hanssen/Hemingway" focuses partly around Luc's past. He departed in "Hanssen/Hemingway", leaving for India to find Eddi.

==== Elliot Hope ====
Paul Bradley plays Elliot Hope, who first appears in the episode "More Equal Than Others" – series eight, episode four of the programme. Elliot is introduced as a consultant surgeon and Clinical Lead on Holby General's cardiothoracic surgery ward. His storylines see his wife Gina, who has motor neuron disease, be assisted in killing herself, and his relationship with his children subsequently deteriorate. Elliot considers suicide himself, before reconciling with his family. He ends a brief romance with colleague Lady Byrne as he is still mourning Gina, and later shares a kiss with his old friend Tara Sodi. Bradley was cast in the role after originally auditioning for a more minor part, and impressing executive producer Richard Stokes. He observed real heart surgery being performed in preparation for the role, and bases his portrayal of Elliot on his own father, who was a doctor. Elliot is portrayed as "a disorganised genius", and "a medical Columbo". He was the focus of Holby City's 2007 Christmas episode, based on the 1964 film It's a Wonderful Life. The assisted suicide storyline proved controversial, though the Elliot-centric Christmas episode was generally well received by critics. The Times's David Chater called it "highly effective in what it sets out to do", though Robert Hanks of The Independent deemed it "incompetent to the point of sacrilege".

==== Jasmine Hopkins ====
Angela Griffin plays nurse Jasmine Hopkins, a nurse who appears from Holby City's first episode until the end of series three. Jasmine begins the serial as a staff nurse on the cardiothoracic surgery ward, Darwin. She is promoted to ward sister, causing tension with her best friend Julie Fitzjohn, who also applied for the position. Jasmine is engaged to Carl, an IT user support technician at the hospital. They argue when he decides to set a date for their wedding without consulting Jasmine about it. When Carl hits Jasmine, she breaks off their engagement. Jasmine walks in on a group of youths stealing from the ward drug store, and is stabbed. Nick Jordan repairs damage to her heart, and as she is stabilised, it is discovered that Jasmine is pregnant. Upon recovering, she plans to have an abortion. Carl threatens to get an injunction to stop her, but Jasmine miscarries. Following the opening of the general surgery ward, Keller, Jasmine becomes a nurse practitioner. During series three, with the introduction of the children's ward, Otter, Jasmine often works with Otter nurse Steve Waring. They fall in love, and sleep together while Steve is still married to his wife, Emma. Steve's son Robbie discovers the affair and threatens to reveal it. Jasmine breaks up with Steve and departs from the hospital.

==== Josh Hudson ====
Trieve Blackwood-Cambridge plays Josh Hudson, who appears from the show's twenty-second series. The character and Blackwood-Cambridge's casting details were announced on 29 October 2020. The character is created as one of three new F1 doctors (F1s) introduced following the show's four-month production break enforced by the COVID-19 pandemic. He joins the show alongside Jeong-Soo Han (Chan Woo Lim) and Skylar Bryce (Phoebe Pryce). Kate Oates, the head of continuing drama at BBC Studios, described the new F1s as "exciting new characters". Josh is characterised as "cheeky-chappy" and "the life and soul of any party" who is keen to begin his medical career. Underneath his cocky persona, Josh has a "heart of gold". Writers paired the character with consultant Ange Godard (Dawn Steele), who is Josh's superior on the ward. The pair's relationship was deemed not ethical and was met with disapproval from CEO Henrik Hanssen (Guy Henry), so they had to end the affair. To film the immediate scenes of the storyline, Blackwood-Cambridge and Steele had to form a work "bubble" and isolate in a hotel for a week. This allowed them to film in close contact, which they were unable to do due to social distancing measures.

==== Mubbs Hussein ====
Ian Aspinall plays Mubbs Hussein, an obstetrics registrar who appears from series four, episode eight until series seven, episode 52. The character was written out when the show decided to focus less on the maternity ward, leaving him with fewer storyline options.

==== Lulu Hutchison ====
Lulu, played by Fiona Hampton, first appeared in the thirteenth series episode "Going It Alone", broadcast on 19 July 2011. Lulu was introduced as a Foundation House Officer 1 (F1) on rotation at Holby City Hospital. Her arrival sees Sacha Levy looking for a new doctor to replace Dr. Penny Valentine who had previously been killed off on the show. She is introduced alongside a highly qualified F1 doctor in competition for a job. However, Director of Surgery Henrik Hanssen (Guy Henry) explains Lulu's privileged connections, as the daughter of Sir Fraser Anderson. Mr Levy ultimately chooses Lulu as the new F1. As Lulu starts her first official day on Acute Assessment Unit (AAU) Nurse Eddi starts to have serious reservations about Sir Fraser's daughter due to a late start and inappropriate footwear. When Michael Spence turns up to work on (AAU), he is immediately drawn to new recruit Lulu and exhibits overly flirtatious 'mentoring' techniques and Lulu reciprocates.

=== J ===
==== Donna Jackson ====
Jaye Jacobs plays ward sister Donna Jackson. Since her first appearance in Holby City in the series six episode "Baptism of Fire", Donna has become more serious about her work, despite her "chaotic" personal life. Jacobs was cast in the role of Donna alongside fellow series six newcomer Kelly Adams, as midwife Mickie Hendrie. The pair's arrival in the show was heavily publicized, and subject of a documentary entitled "Making It at Holby", chronicling their casting process. The two characters embarked on a brief lesbian liaison; however, this caused the BBC to ban its actresses from appearing in raunchy photo-shoots, after being photographed cuddling and kissing while dressed in nurse's uniforms for various 'lads mags'. The character departed in the series thirteen episode "What You Mean By Home", following Jacobs' decision to pursue new projects. The character's reintroduction was announced on 10 February 2017, with her return scheduled for Spring 2017. On her return, Jacobs said, "Donna and I have unfinished business. She's flirty, brash and ballsy. I've missed her!"

==== Nick Jordan ====
Michael French plays Nick Jordan, who appears from the first episode of Holby City as a registrar on the show's cardiothoracic ward. He later returns as a general surgical consultant, before transferring to sister show Casualty to run the Emergency Department. Following Nick's 2006 departure from Holby City, the series' official website described him as: "decisive, confident, charismatic and passionate. He was constantly striving for the top and wanted to emulate Meyer." During his time on Holby City, Nick has several romantic interests, including ex-wife and ward sister Karen Newburn, theatre sister Ellie Sharpe, SHO Kirstie Collins, and registrars Diane Lloyd and Jac Naylor. The series homepage assesses that: "He had tremendous pulling power with women, but commitment was not his strong point." Michael French, discussing his character shortly after the show's 1999 conception, asserted that: "Like most blokes, he sometimes treats women as playthings – if they're willing. A little bit of hanky panky is part of the human condition, after all!" Of his decision to transfer to Casualty, French explained: "The BBC came up with the idea [...] At first, I wasn't sure about him moving away from heart surgery, but we soon thrashed some ideas around and I realised it would work. It's certainly great to play Nick again and I'm having a fantastic time on the show." French was nominated for the "'Most Popular Actor" award in the 2006 National Television Awards for his portrayal of Nick. Both The Guardian and the Sunday Mirror have likened the character to George Clooney's ER character Doug Ross – "the one everyone fancies", but while Andrew Billen for the New Statesman agrees that Nick is "good-looking", he suggests French's playing another "love rat" character after his EastEnders role as David Wicks to be typecasting.

=== K ===
==== Nina Karnik ====
Ayesha Dharker plays Nina Karnik, a general surgeon who first appeared in Spring 2017, within the show's nineteenth series. Nina is the wife of Matteo Rossini (Christian Vit) and billed as "tough but compassionate". Acting executive producer, Simon Harper, described the character as "an emotionally compelling character with a mysterious past." He added that producers had wanted Dharker to appear in the show for a while, and had finally found the right part for her. Dharker and Vit both departed in series 19, episode 60.

==== Ed Keating ====
Rocky Marshall plays Ed Keating, a cardiothoracic registrar who appears from series four, episode 45 until series six, episode 33, working under Tom Campbell-Gore. Ed leaves when he realises he has been set up by Tom Campbell-Gore after an operation goes bad and an investigation is made requiring blame. He is cleared but he knows he can not work with Tom anymore.

==== Maria Kendall ====
Phoebe Thomas plays Maria Kendall, who arrives in Holby City's ninth series as a student nurse, later qualifying as a staff nurse. Although the character did not make her Holby City debut until 28 November 2006, Thomas appeared as Maria on the 17 November 2006 Children in Need charity telethon appeal – which included a segment featuring the Holby City cast performing a version of Hung Up by Madonna.

==== Sam Kennedy ====
Colette Brown plays Sam Kennedy, an SHO who appears from series three, episode 19 until series four, episode 45. Sam meets registrar Alex Adams in the hospital bar. They sleep together, and the next morning discover they are colleagues. They begin a relationship, but he leaves because he discovers she was secretly buying him drink doubles which caused him to knock a child over. She began dating consultant Ric Griffin, who does not show up at their wedding. Sam tells the parents of a young boy that the operation he is due to have is unsafe. The parents remove their child from the hospital and his condition worsens. He is re-admitted and taken to theatre, but dies. When Anton Meyer discovers Sam advised the parents to withdraw their son, she is forced to leave the hospital, but exacts her revenge by telling the press about Meyer's "unsafe" operations.

==== Zubin Khan ====
Art Malik plays Zubin Khan, a consultant anaesthetist and the head of the hospital's intensive care unit, who appears from series five, episode 37 until series seven, episode 51.

=== L ===
==== Chantelle Lane ====
Lauren Drummond plays Chantelle Lane, an agency nurse fresh out of training who is eventually given a permanent staff position on Keller. Her friendly and dutiful manner have seen her take responsibility for failures that were not her fault. Chantelle leaves after realizing that Arthur feels more for her than she for him meaning they couldn't work together so one of them had to leave and so she decided it must be her. Chantelle gets on a bus and leaves after kissing him goodbye during his surprise birthday party. She suggests that she will travel around the world "possibly Ibiza, Thailand, Tibet".

==== Jesse Law ====
Don Gilet plays Jesse Law, a consultant anaesthetist who works on both Keller and Darwin during his tenure.

==== Sacha Levy ====
Bob Barrett plays Sacha Levy, a general surgical registrar who arrives in series twelve. Sacha is the father of Chrissie's son, Daniel. At first his feelings were unreciprocated.

==== Diane Lloyd ====
Patricia Potter plays Diane Lloyd, a general surgical registrar who appears between series four, episode 39 and series nine, episode 38. Diane has a disastrous love life, dating a number of hospital staff and marrying consultant obstetrician Owen Davies, who has an affair with his ex-wife, sister Chrissie Williams. Diane's storylines include a fling with nurse Danny Shaughnessy, aborting the child of Steve Waring and miscarrying Owen's child, the death of her sister, and facing an old medical schools teacher of hers who raped her. She also has an on/off relationship with Ric Griffin, who proposed marriage to her before her arrival in the serial, only to be turned down. Diane is promoted to locum general surgical consultant following the departure of Abra Durant. When the stress of the job becomes too much for her and Diane feels betrayed by Ric, she hands in her resignation. Consultant Elliot Hope suggests she take a sabbatical and lends her his car and a cottage to house-sit for a few months. Diane accepts the offer, but that evening parks the car on a railway line and commits suicide.

==== Tara Lo ====
Jing Lusi plays Tara Lo, Foundation Training Year 1 doctor, who first appears in series 14, episode 21 "Fresh Blood", she is vibrant, beautiful and annoyingly eager, and pushes herself to excel amongst her peers. She comes from a privileged background, but is acutely aware of life's fragility and is in a hurry to establish herself as a brilliant doctor. Her perfectionist nature sometimes hides a lack of confidence and her temper has a short fuse when things do not go her way. On rare occasions, when she lets her guard down, she has an endearingly goofy sense of humour. Tara has an inoperable brain tumour which she tries to keep secret. Director of Surgery Henrik Hanssen (Guy Henry) finds out about the condition but allows Tara to continue working on that basis that she is candid about her condition and notifies him should she become symptomatic.

Colleague Jac Naylor refers to Tara by the nickname "St. Trinians" most likely because of her petite stature and lack of years (reminding her of nothing more than a schoolgirl).

Tara starts a romantic relationship with Oliver "Ollie" Valentine (James Anderson) and eventually tells Oliver about her inoperable brain tumour. Ollie is shocked and goes into overdrive looking for cures. Tara tells him he must accept her tumour and come to terms with it as she has, and their relationship becomes stronger. Ollie moves into Tara's flat some weeks later. However, as Tara's brain tumour grows and becomes symptomatic, she is persuaded to have life-threatening surgery to reduce it. Tara asks Ollie to marry her and he accepts. He also respects her wishes to have her organs donated if she dies in surgery. She praises Ollie to her parents that "he's the best thing that's ever happened to me. I wouldn't have lasted two minutes in my job if it wasn't for him. He has put himself on the line, so many times for me. He knows everything about me, and he would do anything for me," after they find out she and Ollie are getting married. Her parents want the couple to wait until Tara has recovered from her surgery. Later that day, Tara and Ollie get married in front of her parents and their friends and co-workers, Elliot Hope (Paul Bradley), Jac Naylor (Rosie Marcel), Jonny Maconie (Michael Thomson) and Mo Effanga (Chizzy Akudolu), at Holby hospital gardens.

Tara goes in for her brain surgery with her husband Ollie by her side, but following complications she is pronounced brainstem-dead and sadly dies. With Tara's parents and Ollie's permission, her organs are donated as she requested.

=== M ===
==== Jonny Maconie ====
Michael Thompson plays Charge Nurse and Transplant coordinator Jonny Maconie who first appeared on 15 May 2012. We first see him attending a course with Jac Naylor. There is an instant spark between the two and they begin a sexual relationship. He begins his role at Holby a fortnight later, much to Jac's surprise who had no idea he was a nurse. Jonny becomes an instant favourite with both Staff and patients. He remains very close to Jac and the two have a very tempestuous relationship and break up and reconcile on a few occasions. Their encounters end up in Jac becoming pregnant and although not together, Jonny gives his word he will be there for both her and the baby. It turns out that when the baby is born it only has a 50% chance of survival, Jonny remains optimistic and positive for Jac although he is secretly as scared as she is. Jonny also has a very close friendship with Registrar Mo Effanga, although the two often clash over patients and protocol. On April 1, 2014, he was due to be married to Nurse Bonnie Wallis; however, she was killed moments before the wedding was due to begin.

==== Roxanna MacMillan ====
Hermione Gulliford plays consultant neurosurgeon Roxanna MacMillan, who first appears in the fifteenth series episode "The End of The Beginning". The character appears in three episodes as Tara Lo's (Jing Lusi) neurosurgeon before departing. At the producers' request, Gulliford agreed to reprise the role in 2017 for six episodes. They then invited the actress to join the show's regular cast. Roxanna returns in the nineteenth series episode "Things Left Unsaid". To prepare for the role, Gulliford read books written by neurosurgeon Henry Marsh. She enjoyed the medical aspect of the role and liked portraying a neurosurgeon, but thought that she would not make a good surgeon in real life.

Producers told Gulliford that her character would be involved in a storyline featuring John Gaskell (Paul McGann), who had yet to join the series. A backstory for Roxanna was established through her relationships with John and Henrik Hanssen (Guy Henry), who she attended university with. Gulliford explained that Roxanna, John and Hanssen have a "huge amount of respect" for each other, but stated that it soon becomes apparent that Roxanna has more respect for John than he has for her. Producers wanted to explore the history between the friends, and a flashback episode exploring their history was created. Gulliford enjoyed working with Henry and McGann; she was already friends with Henry from previous acting work together.

In the twentieth series episode "Undoing", the character is killed off. Gulliford's departure had not been announced prior to transmission, creating a surprise for the audience. In the episode, Roxanna, who has developed locked-in syndrome following a neurosurgical operation performed by John, tries to tell their colleagues about John's fraudulent research project. John discovers this and injects Roxanna with a neurotoxin, killing her. Producers told Gulliford that her character would die when explaining the storyline to her. Executive producer Simon Harper said that the actress dealt with the situation with "great grace and aplomb". He opined that Gulliford gave a "wonderful, nuanced performance as Roxanna" and felt fortunate that she was involved in the storyline. On her departure, Gulliford told David Brown of the Radio Times that she felt accepted by the show's cast and crew, commenting, "It was hard to say goodbye to Roxanna, who I've really enjoyed playing." Roxanna's death was nominated for Biggest OMG Soap moment and Most devastating Soap Death at the 2018 Digital Spy Reader Awards. Neither nominations won in their respective categories.

==== Kylie Maddon ====
Amy Murphy portrays Kylie Maddon, who appears from the show's twenty-second series. The character and Murphy's casting was announced on 3 February 2021, and Murphy's agency later confirmed that she had joined the show's regular cast. The character is billed as a "warm, vibrant and charming" staff nurse on the AAU. She is characterised as a positive person to have on the ward as she always tries to make people feel better with her "bubbly" personality. Underneath her strength, Kylie is deeply insecure and it upsets her that she does not have a romantic partner. Kylie's introduction sees her face prejudice from her male colleagues as they doubt she will last on the busy ward. This annoys Kylie and she "rises to the challenge", settling into the ward quickly.

==== Antoine Malick ====
Jimmy Akingbola plays surgical registrar Antoine Malick. Akingbola had previously appeared in Holby City as a guest star, and impressed the producers to the extent that he was cast in a permanent role. Executive producer Belinda Campbell described Malick as "a complex character who completely divides opinion amongst his Holby colleagues", explaining: "He absolutely refuses to play the political game and his bedside manner leaves a lot to be desired. However, there is no doubt he excels at his job and what would overwhelm other medics is like nectar to Malick." Akingbola deemed his character "an alpha male who doesn't suffer fools gladly". He explained that Malick aims to become a consultant, but has been held back from promotion due to his inability to engage in hospital politics. Akingbola stated that Malick has "a lot of dark layers", but will become calmer as the series goes on.

==== Zosia March ====
Camilla Arfwedson portrays F1 doctor Zosia March who made her debut on 10 September 2013. Coming over as arrogant and stubborn, she clashes with both colleagues and patients, in particular Jac Naylor who has no time for her attitude although both are strikingly similar. By her own admission she is just doing what she has to do as her real interests lie with psychiatry and this is the specialty she wants to take. She has a brief sexual relationship with Arthur, she then becomes his flatmate and the two again begin an intimate relationship. She makes it clear to Arthur this is all she wants. When her father, Guy Self, becomes CEO, she wants nothing to do with him. The reason for this is unknown but her mother does seem to be an area of particular contention between the two. Later Zosia goes on to Darwin for her F2 training and Elliot Hope pairs her up with Mr Oliver Valentine. Zosia and Ollie become good friends and Ollie secretly likes Zosia but is too afraid to say. Before he can Zosia starts dating Sebastian Coulter who is a psychiatrist. Later Zosia breaks up with Seb after noticing she has feelings for Ollie and starts to date him. when an army surgeon comes to the hospital Zosia, Ollie and Guy are put on a case together but guy and Ollie clash and later Zosia has to pick who she would rather spend her birthday with her boyfriend Oliver or her father Guy. Zosia eventually chooses Ollie to Guy's disappointment.

==== Cara Martinez ====
Cara Martinez, played by Niamh Walsh, made her first screen appearance during the seventeenth series on 16 June 2015. Cara is a staff nurse on AAU. Of her character, Walsh stated "Cara's a very capable nurse, and isn't afraid to speak her mind." Cara clashes with Raf di Lucca (Joe McFadden) on her first day, but she is able to provide a fresh perspective on a patient's treatment. Walsh added that both Cara and Raf are "strong-minded". Cara departed Holby City on 23 June 2016, after a year with the show.

==== Stuart McElroy ====
Conor Mullen plays locum cardiothoracic consultant Stuart McElroy, who first appears in "The Apprentice" – series 10, episode 4 of the programme. Mullen was contracted for a period of 3–4 months. Upon assuming the role, Mullen said of his character: "As a locum, Stuart knows he's not going to be at Holby for ever, so he doesn't care about hospital politics. Stuart also gets the nurses' back up a bit by making changes. The man's a bit of a renegade!" The BBC described Stuart following his departure as "a people person full of Irish charm. But he was also a deeply jealous alcoholic and needed to control the person he saw as 'his'." Stuart's time on the show sees him embark on a romantic relationship with sister Chrissie Williams. His jealous nature causes problems between them, and during a drunken row, he slashes her face with a scalpel. Hobley, who plays Chrissie, described the scene as "shocking" and "hard to film", revealing that she was three months pregnant at the time, but had not told anyone on set apart from Mullen "so he knew not to be too rough". Stuart is subsequently arrested, and makes his final appearance in series ten, episode 18, "The Extra Mile".

==== Louis McGerry ====
Tyler Luke Cunningham portrays Louis McGerry, who appears from the show's twenty-second series. The character and Cunningham's casting details were not announced prior to broadcast of his debut, on 31 March 2019. The character is initially introduced as the son of established character Max McGerry (Jo Martin), before joining the regular cast as a staff nurse. Louis is characterised as "fiercely proud, irritatingly stubborn, strong and warm-hearted". Louis, like Cunningham, is a trans man; his first episode coincides with International Transgender Day of Visibility. The character's backstory states that he struggled with his identity growing up and felt unable to speak to Max, so left home and found a supportive trans community. Louis' first story focuses on his estranged relationship with his mother and their attempts at reconciliation. Underneath Louis' independence and stubbornness, he secretly longs for his mother's approval. Cunningham used his own experiences as a trans man to develop the characters of Louis and Max. Martin was excited to work with Cunningham and hoped that Louis' introduction would encourage "honest dialogue".

==== Max McGerry ====
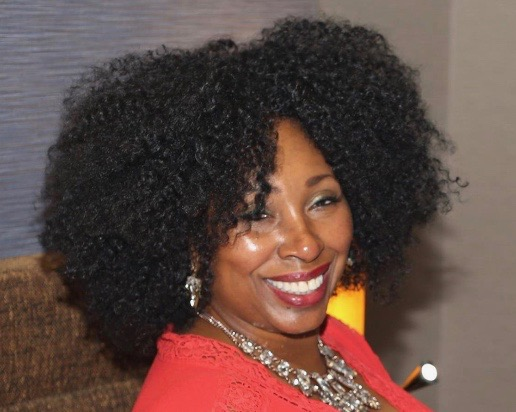
Jo Martin portrays Max McGerry.

Jo Martin portrays Max McGerry, who appears from the show's twenty-first series. The character and Martin's casting details were announced on 26 June 2019. The character is introduced as a consultant neurosurgeon who arrives at Holby City Hospital to treat a patient from a neighbouring hospital. Simon Harper, the show's executive producer, billed the character as "a brilliant, multi-faceted character" who is "wry, funny [and] passionately driven". She dislikes political correctness and refers to people who use this as "snowflakes". Martin called her "very complex with no filter", and told Laura-Jayne Tyler of Inside Soap that while she is "fearless", Max does have a softer side. Harper pointed out that former neurosurgical characters were typically "the equivalent of Defence of the Dark Arts at Hogwarts" and questioned whether Max would be able to defy the trend. Both professional and personal stories were created for the character; Harper explained that her professional story would explore "highly topical" questions about the NHS, while stories about her personal life would be "increasingly turbulent". Martin expressed her excitement at joining Holby City and described playing the character as "a pleasure". Harper dubbed the actress a "fabulous addition" to the cast and revealed that producers had created the role for Martin.

Writers incorporated Max into established character Ric Griffin's (Hugh Quarshie) story about his brain tumour when he asks her to operate on him, creating a clash with Serena Campbell (Catherine Russell), who believes the operation is too risky. Following this, the character was hired as the hospital's acting chief executive officer, replacing Henrik Hanssen (Guy Henry). Martin opined that Max has "big shoes to fill" and revealed that the characters would be involved in "a cat-and-mouse game". Max is a tough leader and believes that lots of work is required to perfect the running of the hospital. She is also unafraid of cutting budgets to save money. Martin quipped that her character's behaviour resembles villain Maleficent. Her personality can often cause her to clash with her colleagues, which Martin believed was because she was "misunderstood". On Max's backstory, Martin explained that she has secrets and repressed "sadness". Max's backstory was explored in series 22 with the introduction of her son, Louis McGerry (Tyler Luke Cunningham), who is transgender.

==== Keri McGrath ====
Anna Mountford plays pediatric outreach nurse Keri McGrath, who appears from series three, episode two until series four, episode 41. Keri likes to party hard and often turns up to work with a hangover. Some of the children pick up on Keri's youthful attitude and run rings around her thinking she is a soft touch. At the start of series four, she gets drunk at a party and sleeps with Liam Evans. The next morning, Keri leaves the flat in tears and reports Liam for rape. The claim is eventually dropped and Liam's name is cleared. Keri leaves the show when Otter ward is written out of the serial.

==== Eddi McKee ====
Sarah Jane Potts plays Eddi McKee, a senior nurse, who first appears in the episode "Rescue Me". She portrays a no-nonsense, feisty and unsociable young woman, until she meets Luc Hemingway. She initially hates him and his smart-ass behaviour, partly as he frequently mentioned her alcohol problems. In the episodes "Ribbons", "Unsafe Haven" and "Long Way Down", her hatred towards him is shown to have decreased greatly, and she eventually enters a relationship with him. In "Long Way Down" Luc reveals it is his last day, and even though he was offered a permanent contract, for reasons unknown, he left without any warning. She takes it to mean that he couldn't commit to a relationship with her. After Luc's disappearance, she becomes somewhat emotionally unstable and moody, her ability to move forward is hindered by the constant reminders of him by colleagues. Eddi grows close to a locum, Max Schneider, who comes in to replace Luc. She left in the episode "Chasing Demons" after battling a drug addiction. In "Hanssen/Hemingway", it was shown that Eddi was now living in India.

==== Muriel McKendrick ====
Phyllis Logan plays original character Muriel McKendrick, who appears in Holby City's first nine episodes. Muriel is frequently at odds with Anton Meyer over beds on the wards. Muriel goes to the board and obtains four of Meyer's beds behind his back, and when he finds out he is furious. Muriel has a good working relationship with most of the staff, but is noted for her strict ways and no-nonsense personality.

==== Nicky McKendrick ====
Nicky McKendrick, played by Belinda Owusu, will make her first appearance in the sixty-third episode of series 19. The character and Owusu's casting details were announced on 29 September 2017, alongside those of Salma Haque who plays Nicky's best friend Meena Chowdhury. Nicky is an F1, who comes from a working class background. Both Nicky and Meena struggle to impress Jac Naylor (Rosie Marcel) and keep up with the pace of their rotation. Series producer Kate Hall commented that Nicky's friendship with Meena would be "sorely tested". Owusu appears as Nicky in a two-part crossover episode with Holby City's sister show, Casualty, originally broadcast in March 2019.

==== Victoria Merrick ====
Lisa Faulkner plays PRHO Victoria Merrick, who appears from Holby City's first episode until series three, episode 30. The character was killed off at Faulkner's request, who wanted to have a "gruesome death". She added that "it's only afterwards that you really realise it means you can never come back, even if you wanted to."

Victoria is a surgeon who has a good grasp of the human anatomy but struggles to cope under the intense pressure of operations and begin using ampethamines to help her get through the gruelling days. Her father, Sir Charles Merrick, is an eminent surgeon and she struggles with his high expectations. Her boss, Anton Meyer, considers her an intelligent young woman with a lot of potential and, despite his abhorrence of her drug dependency, decides to give her a second chance. Meyer does not consider her to be suitable material for a surgeon and transfers her to the paediatric wing to work as a doctor. Viewing this as beneath her, Victoria tries to convince him to reinstate her as a surgeon, but he insists the experience will be good for her as a way to take control of her emotions. In season three, Victoria begins a relationship with plastic surgeon Guy Morton and the two become engaged. However, when Victoria discovers Guy is taking amphetamines, she encourages him to quit. When an operation on their shared patient, Alison Campbell, goes wrong after she develops a pulmonary embolism after being on the table for too long, Victoria discovers Guy is still on amphetamines. Blaming him for Alison's death, she ends the engagement. She rebounds with Alex Adams, who, after spending the night with her, returns to her flat the following evening to find her stabbed to death in her kitchen.

After an investigation, which sees Alex Adams, Guy Morton and an obsessed patient considered as suspects, the killer is later unmasked as Alison Campbell's father, James. He confesses to Meyer while they are trapped in a lift, before taking an overdose. Meyer is outraged and attempts to revive Campbell so that he can be brought to trial and punished for Victoria's murder, but is hampered by the lack of equipment available to him in the lift and Campbell subsequently dies.

==== Anton Meyer ====
George Irving plays cardiothoracic consultant Anton Meyer from Holby City's first episode until series four, episode 46. Irving had considerable input in creating the character, who was initially envisioned by the series producers as an Iranian surgeon named Hussein. At Irving's suggestion, Meyer became Hungarian, an emigrant to Britain following the 1956 Hungarian Revolution. Little of the backstory created for Meyer was ever revealed on-screen, as part of a deliberate bid to present the character as enigmatic, allowing viewers to project their own imagination onto him. Meyer is a sarcastic, arrogant surgeon, with high expectations of all his colleagues. His major storylines see him operate on his own sister, fear that he may have motor neuron disease, lose his spleen after being shot in a road rage incident, and ultimately depart from Holby for Michigan when the hospital board make impositions on his autonomy. Irving made the decision to leave the series as he struggled to set the character aside outside of work, which had a negative impact on his personal life. He has ruled out the possibility of returning to Holby City in future, preferring his memory of Meyer to remain untarnished.

Meyer proved popular with viewers and critics. Jim Shelley of The Mirror has described Meyer as "one of the best characters on television in recent years".

==== Faye Morton ====
Patsy Kensit plays ward sister Faye Morton. The character's introductory storyline, shot on location in Dubai, sees Faye leave her third husband for dead after a violent row. The fate of her previous husbands, and her intentions towards on-screen lover Joseph Byrne, later unravel in another special episode, this set on location in South Africa. Kensit was short-listed for the "Best Actress" award at the 2007 TV Quick and TV Choice Awards for her portrayal of Faye, within three months of arriving on the show. However, the dramaticism of the character's storylines and the manner in which they reflect upon real NHS nurses has come under criticism.

=== N ===
==== Jac Naylor ====
Rosie Marcel plays Cardiothoracic Consultant Jac Naylor. Her storylines focus on her attempts to gain promotion, going as far as to sleep with her boyfriend's influential father, and switch specialties from general to cardiothoracic surgery. She appears in a crossover episode with HolbyBlue, when she is arrested for the attempted murder of a patient. After being cleared of the attack, Jac briefly becomes softer in her outlook, attempting to make amends with colleagues and dabbling with Catholicism. She then shared another relationship with Joseph Byrne, but then he announced that he was leaving to go to live in the country with his son Harry, and she denied his offer to go with him. She has been in an on/off relationship with Jonny Maconie for a while, and was shocked that she was pregnant with his baby, which has complications.

==== Karen Newburn ====
Sarah Preston plays ward sister Karen Newburn, who appears from series one, episode two until series two, episode 16. Karen has a good rapport with most of the staff, but puts them in their place if they do something she disagrees with. Karen is the ex-wife of registrar Nick Jordan. She agrees to give their relationship a second chance, but when their attempt at reconciliation fails, Nick leaves Holby. Karen's exit goes unexplained.

=== P ===
==== Matt Parker ====
Adam Best plays medical student Matt Parker. He appears from series seven, episode 29, until series nine, episode 24.

==== Frieda Petrenko ====
Olga Fedori portrays ward sister Frieda Petrenko. Introduced as the cardiothoracic surgery ward's night shift sister, Frieda transfers to day shifts on the Acute Assessment Unit to cover the maternity leave of sister Chrissie Williams (Tina Hobley). Frieda has an initially antagonistic relationship with F2 doctor Penny Valentine (Emma Catherwood). When Penny learns that Frieda was a qualified doctor in her home country, Ukraine, she encourages her to retrain in the UK. Frieda resists the suggestion, but after being made redundant and having her diagnostic ability challenged by registrar Antoine Malick (Jimmy Akingbola), decides to apply for an F1 position, which she achieves early in 2011.

From the Ukraine, Frieda is a sardonic goth. She's as cynical as she is honest. Happy to take the night shift to avoid the politics and people that make life too complicated. She won't indulge egos and her bedside manner leaves a lot to be desired, but beneath it all, she does have a real compassion and vulnerability. She's unlikely to forge friendships with ease but when she does it's likely to be one she'll fight tooth and nail for.

— BBC Online

The official Holby City website describes Frieda as "sincere, compassionate, supportive [and] honest", but "self conscious, emotionally closed [and] sarcastic." In 2011, Fedori was short-listed for the "Best Newcomer" award at the National Television Awards for her performance as Frieda. The award was ultimately won by EastEnders's Ricky Norwood. Ian Cullen of Monsters and Critics lamented Fedori's loss, opining that her performance in Holby City is hilarious. Frieda has received critical acclaim, with the Daily Mirror's Jim Shelley naming her the "best character on television". Shelley has included several of her one-liners in his regular "Soundbites of the Week" column, including her excuse: "I saw it in one of your Carry On films. I thought he might like it", delivered after inserting a sunflower into the rectum of a racist patient. Fellow Mirror critic Jane Simon has also praised Frieda, deeming her one of the series' most interesting characters. Simon describes her as a "fearless, straight talking [...] super-nurse", enjoying her ability to "liven up the place with her unlikely combination of ghoulish demeanour and slapstick sense of humour." When a 2011 storyline featured Frieda facing redundancy, Simon commented, "we would be gutted if she left. Her friendly scowl is one of the best things about the show."

=== R ===
==== Paul Ripley ====
Luke Mably plays ward clerk Paul Ripley, who appears in the first three episodes of Holby City. Paul is ordered to leave the hospital after he is seen kissing an unconscious girl in the high dependency unit.

==== Matteo Rossini ====
Matteo Rossini, played by Christian Vit, made his first appearance during the nineteenth series episode "Parasite", broadcast on 29 November 2016. Matteo is a consultant, who joins the team on the Darwin ward. The character's entrance sees him arriving at the hospital on horseback. Vit stated, "Horseback riding doesn't scare him, so why not show up at the hospital on one? It's assertive, romantic and passionate – and he's not afraid to break the rules sometimes!" Matteo's arrival will cause Jac Naylor (Rosie Marcel) to feel threatened and Vit teased a potential romance between the characters. Matteo has been dubbed the show's new "Italian stallion". Matteo later develops a relationship with fellow Cardiothoracic Consultant, Jac Naylor, which backfired

=== S ===
==== Rosie Sattar ====
Kim Vithana plays midwife Rosie Sattar, who appears from series five, episode 32 until series seven, episode 13.

==== Ben Saunders ====
David Paisley plays midwife Ben Saunders, appearing between series four, episode 17 and series five, episode 29. Ben is the first regular male homosexual character in the show. He has a crossover romance, with Tony Vincent from Casualty. The pair's frequent clashes and Ben's cheating with another man lead to a violent dock-side fight, as a result of which Tony has serious kidney damage. The two break up, and are unable to reconcile. Ben struggles with coming out as gay to his parents, and at one stage enlists the help of fellow midwife and good friend Lisa Fox. When Ben's car is stolen by the teenage son of colleague Steve Waring, a car chase ensues, resulting in a crash which traps both Ben and Steve inside Steve's car. Ben dies within minutes of being cut out of the vehicle.

==== Guy Self ====
John Michie began playing Guy Self on 26 November 2013. Guy is Holby City Hospital's former CEO, former director of surgery and consultant neurosurgeon. As of April 2015 Guy is director of Neurosurgery. Guy, who comes across as firm but fair, immediately clashes with then acting CEO Serena Campbell (Catherine Russell), consultant general surgeon Michael Spence (Hari Dhillon) and head of general surgery Ric Griffin (Hugh Quarshie) over patients and protocol. His colleagues, however, come onto his side when he shows his dedication to his staff by giving his backing to Serena in a difficult situation. It is later revealed that F1, Zosia March (Camilla Arfwedson) is his daughter and the two have a strained relationship following Zosia's mother's death. Zosia makes it clear to Guy that she wants nothing to do with him both personally and professionally. Prior to his arrival at HCH, he had a previously relationship with Colette Sheward (Louise Delamere).

==== Sahira Shah ====
Laila Rouass appeared as surgeon Sahira Shah from February 2011. Announcing her casting, Daniel Kilkelly of media entertainment website Digital Spy described Sahira as a rival for Jac and love interest for Greg, who shares a "dark history" with Hanssen. Rouass was able to relate to the role as, like herself, Sahira is a mother attempting to balance her personal and professional lives. Executive producer Belinda Campbell stated that Rouass brought a "fresh new energy" to the series and that Sahira had been a "joy to create", commenting on the character: "While on the surface she appears to be cool and calm, underneath it all, she is kicking madly just to keep afloat. It will be fascinating to explore what is really going on underneath the façade of perfection Sahira has created for herself. I'm sure her character will be someone a lot of viewers will recognise in themselves."

==== Ellie Sharpe ====
Julie Saunders appears in the first nine episodes of Holby City as theatre sister Ellie Sharpe. Ellie has an affair with Nick Jordan. When her boyfriend finds out, he turns up at the hospital and he attacks Nick in the lift, leaving him with a split lip and damaged pride.

==== Danny Shaughnessy ====
Jeremy Edwards plays healthcare assistant Danny Shaughnessy, who appears from series two, episode one until series five, episode 32. Danny works alongside his mother, ward sister Kath. He has relationships with Victoria Merrick and Diane Lloyd, and later trains as a student nurse on Otter ward. He eventually leaves to start a new life in Australia.

==== Colette Sheward ====
Louise Delamere portrays Director of Nursing Colette Sheward. She made her first appearance in Series 16 on 3 December 2013 after coming to Holby with a previous patient of new CEO Guy Self to request his help with a difficult operation. Guy then offered her the director of nursing position. Guy and Colette's clearly have a professional history but it is unclear if this has ever crossed over into a Personal one. Following her appointment, the new head of HR is unhappy at how Colette got the position via unofficial channels, shadows her for a day and, unhappy with her handling of her staff and delicate situations, decides the director of nursing position must be advertised, meaning Colette will have to reapply for her own job. Colette takes this on the chin and almost relishes the challenge.

==== Morven Shreve ====
Morven Shreve (also Digby), played by Eleanor Fanyinka, made her first appearance during the seventeenth series on 30 June 2015. Fanyinka was working in a call centre when she learned that she had been cast as Morven. Morven is a Foundation Training Year 1 on AAU, under the mentorship of Arthur Digby (Rob Ostlere), who she hero-worships. Fanyinka explained that Morven knew Arthur from medical school and is intimidated by his reputation. When she becomes anxious, Morven uses cockney rhyming slang to ease tension. Fanyinka described her character as "quite kooky" and added "Morven is really intelligent – it's just that her spatial awareness is a bit off!" Fanyinka left the role in 2017 and Morven departed in the final episode of the nineteenth series, broadcast on 19 December 2017.

==== Lucky Simpson ====
Vineeta Rishi plays Lucky Simpson, who first appears in the show's twenty-second series. The character and Rishi's casting details were announced on 29 October 2020. The character is created as a mental health nurse introduced following the show's four-month production break enforced by the COVID-19 pandemic. Kate Oates, the head of continuing drama at BBC Studios, described Lucky as one of the "exciting new characters" being introduced. Lucky is characterised as "warm, empathetic and unnervingly intelligent". She is excellent at her job and is both "an avid listener and a vivacious talker". Lucky enjoys a gossip with her co-workers, but is aware that people are cautious of her due to her job role. The character is introduced after being hired by Michael Townsend (Elliot Levey), the chairman of the hospital board, to help the hospital staff following the pandemic. She shares a backstory with established character Max McGerry (Jo Martin) which is explored as part of Lucky's first storyline. Rishi departed the serial in 2021 and Lucky makes her exit in the show's twenty-third and final series at the conclusion of a story where the character becomes tetraplegic.

==== Michael Spence ====
Hari Dhillon plays consultant general surgeon Michael Spence, who first appears in the episode "Unfinished Symphony" – series ten, episode six of the programme. Dhillon describes his character as: "kind of the counterpoint to Ric Griffin. So he's just a little bit lippy; if he's thinking it, it's out of his mouth, and a total straight shooter, very direct." Michael is married to anaesthetist Annalese Carson. His storylines see him cheat on his wife with nurse Donna Jackson, with Dhillon explaining: "(H)e's kind of a serial womaniser. [...] The trouble is, Michael had an affair at another hospital. He left because he wanted a clean slate. Essentially he wants to flirt – it is in his nature. With the introduction of the character, a new private ward was annexed to the hospital, known as HolbyCare.

==== Sam Strachan ====
Tom Chambers plays cardiothoracic registrar Sam Strachan. Chambers was cast as Sam after auditioning for the smaller role of an American doctor, and impressing casting director Julie Harkin so much that he was invited back to audition for the bigger role. The character takes a more serious turn after being diagnosed with Non-Hodgkin lymphoma, a storyline for which Tom Chambers actually shaved his own hair for realism. Sam has proved highly popular amongst fans of the show, voted in the 2007 fan awards "Favourite All-Time Male" character. However, he also attracted controversy when a scene in which he was depicted binge drinking caused drinks regulatory body the Portman Group to lodge an official complaint with OFCOM, for what they deemed a "highly irresponsible portrayal of excessive and rapid drinking". Sam leaves to go to America when his long lost son accepts a music scholarship there.

==== Ray Sykes ====
Ian Curtis plays staff nurse Ray Sykes, who appears from the first episode of Holby City until series two, episode 16. Ray is Darwin ward's comedian. He often engages in jokes with patients and enjoys match-making and gossiping. Ray is unsure of his sexuality and starts dating a former patient, Damien. When he tells Damien he wants to break up, Damien takes it badly and has another heart attack. Ray calls an ambulance and Kirstie Collins arrives, but is unable to save Damien, leaving Ray devastated.

=== T ===
==== Elizabeth Tait ====
La Charné Jolly plays Elizabeth Tait, a staff nurse who first appears in series twelve. Elizabeth is a recent university graduate, who worries she will be made unemployed when redundancies are made within the hospital. Series 12 Episode 35 – Series 14 Episode 2

==== Alistair Taylor ====
Dominic Jephcott plays Alistair Taylor, a cardiothoracic consultant who appears from series four, episode 45 until series six, episode 33. Alistair has an unstable marriage with his wife and colleague Janice, with whom he has a daughter, Flora. The relationship collapses after he pursues an affair with ward sister Chrissie Williams. Alistair is killed off in the 2004 Casualty@Holby City crossover after escaping a fire by jumping out of a window.

==== Janice Taylor ====
Siobhan Redmond plays consultant paediatrician Janice Taylor, who appears from series three, episode two until series four, episode 44. Janice is married to Alistair, who works at Holby on a locum basis on Darwin ward. She is initially oblivious to the fact that her husband has been having an affair with ward sister Chrissie Williams, until she finds out she is pregnant. Janice decides to keep the baby but move away from Alistair. Her last episode sees her have an emergency caesarean. Her baby, Flora, needs a heart operation which Alistair carries out. Flora survives, Janice thanks him, then departs from the series.

==== Sean Thompson ====
Chinna Wodu plays Sean Thompson, a Senior house officer who appears in series seven from episode six until episode 43. Sean is a love interest of nurse Jess Griffin. He initially believes he is the father of her baby, but even after she revealed the child is anaesthetist Zubin Khan's, he continues to support her. After Jess leaves him for Zubin, he transfers quietly to neighbouring hospital St. James'.

==== Harry Tressler ====
Jules Knight plays CT1 doctor Harry Tressler. Harry arrives on 14 May 2013 and makes an instant impression on the female staff of the hospital with his good looks and charm. He starts a brief fling with Mary-Claire. She becomes smitten with him but he tells her he never wanted a relationship. Early on he has problems with consultant Ric Griffin who believes him to be selfish and just interested in himself. Harry also often clashes with F2 Gemma Wilde and there is a clear spark between the two but Gemma is put off by Harry's reputation and attitude. After Gemma leaves, Harry becomes very upset and we see a new side to him. Harry does begin to show his true colours and ability going the extra mile for several patients and colleagues, even treating a homeless patient's dog. His friendship with Mary-Claire also blossoms and the two become good friends. His relationship with his colleagues also hugely improves with his seniors seeing his potential and valuing him as a member of the team.

==== Kyla Tyson ====
Rakie Ayola plays nurse Kyla Tyson, who first appears in the series eight episode "I'll Be Back". Ayola had made a former minor appearance in the show several years prior to being cast as Kyla, and was asked to return in a more permanent role three years later. The character is the focus of a number of hard hitting plot strands, including being subjected to domestic abuse, having her son taken into foster care, and battling resultant alcoholism. In August 2006, Ayola was shortlisted for the "Female Performance in TV" award at the fourth Screen Nation Awards for her portrayal of the character, and was granted "Honourable Mention" in the same category the following year. Ayola chose not to renew her Holby City contract, in order to have a second child. She makes her final appearance in series eleven, when she decides between moving to Rotterdam with her son, or to Ghana with lover Abra Durant.

=== V ===
==== Oliver Valentine ====
James Anderson plays Oliver "Ollie" Valentine, who first appears in series eleven, along with his sister, Penny, as a Foundation House Officer. Registrar Jac Naylor originally dislikes Oliver, but later realises that not only is he a good doctor, but he also tries to understand the patients, and has him transferred to the Acute Assessment Unit. On AAU, Oliver becomes friends with Chrissie Williams. They sleep together, and Chrissie becomes pregnant, but goes on to miscarry. Oliver is transferred to the general surgery ward, Keller, after annoying AAU lead Linden Cullen. Oliver works alongside Jac on Keller ward, and the two share a kiss, which Penny photographs and posts throughout the hospital. Oliver attempts to hide the photos from ward sister Daisha Anderson, who he is casually dating. When Daisha discovers the photos, she slaps him and ends their relationship. Oliver caused friction on Darwin when he treated a patient that nearly killed him and lied to Connie that Greg left him unsupervised to save his own skin. Greg, however, found out and got his own back at him by setting him up with a prostitute. On 1 March 2011, Oliver landed himself in hot water when the patient he made a mistake when closing him up a while ago was brought back on AAU. Under stress that the mistake would make him repeat his F2 year, tried to persuade Penny to take the blame. With an enquiry looming, Oliver snuck into Michael Spence's files and deleted his name from the list, trying to put Penny's name instead thus jeopardising her own career which had gone from strength to strength. However, he was eventually caught out by registrar Antoine Malick and was reported. When Penny found out what he tried to do, she said what he did was unforgivable and said he was "Toxic". It was then revealed that Oliver is actually practicing illegally, as he stole his sister's papers and passed them off as his own. Penny told him to admit it all to Michael Spence or she will, and gave him a deadline. Although the results showed that Oliver was innocent, he somewhat started to spiral out of control and breaks down in front of Penny when he confesses that he cheated on their final exams before starting work at Holby, passing her exam off as his, therefore not legally qualified to work as a Doctor. Penny was furious for what he did and told him that he has to confess his bombshell by the time she returns from annual leave, or she will. On the episode broadcast on 12 April 2011, Penny was killed saving a patient at the wreckage of a train crash, leaving Oliver to identify the body. He plans to tell the truth to Mallick, who convinces him not to tell anyone, saying that this conversation did not happen. Oliver is last seen in this episode sitting on a bench with Penny's belongings. Oliver starts a romantic relationship with F1 doctor Tara Lo (Jing Lusi); however, he is shocked when he learns that Tara has an inoperable brain tumour, and he goes into overdrive looking for cures. Weeks later he has moved into Tara' flat, Tara's brain tumour grows and she decides to have life-threatening surgery to reduce it. On the day before Tara's operation, they get married in front of Tara's parents and their friends and co-workers, Elliot Hope, Jac Naylor, Jonny Maconie and Mo Effanga at Holby hospital gardens. Tara is taken into the operating theatre and dies during her surgery. Since his return, he has been developing and fighting his feelings for Zosia March which later resulted in a love triangle as she was dating colleague, Sebastian Coulter. Tara

==== Penny Valentine ====
Emma Catherwood played Penny Valentine, who first appears in series eleven, along with her brother, Oliver, as a Foundation House Officer. Catherwood sat in on several bypass operations as preparation for the role. She also dyed her hair red, commenting: "I think it suits Penny. She's quite feisty and ambitious and enjoys a friendly rivalry with her brother Oliver". On her first day at the hospital, Penny proves herself confident but averse to becoming close to patients. Registrar Jac Naylor takes an instant dislike to her, and ignores her request to be transferred to AAU, instead placing her on Keller ward. After improving herself as a doctor on Keller, Penny is transferred to Darwin with Elliot Hope as her mentor. While working on Darwin, Penny secretly starts a relationship with patient Scott James, who requires a heart transplant. Elliot realises what has transpired between doctor and patient, and is disappointed with Penny. Disillusioned with her career, Penny decides to move to Spain with Scott; however, Scott ends their relationship on Oliver's advice. Penny occasionally smokes, much to the disdain of her brother. Penny's full name is revealed to be Persephone, not, as might be supposed, Penelope. She died in the episode broadcast on 12 April 2011 after an accident at a train crash; her body was identified by her brother, Oliver.

=== W ===
==== Steve Waring ====
Peter de Jersey plays charge nurse Steve Waring, who appears from series three, episode two until series five, episode 31. Steve falls in love with nurse practitioner Jasmine Hopkins, and has an affair with her. His son, Robbie, finds out about the affair, but decides not to tell his mother. The relationship between Steve and Jasmine falls apart. Steve later has a relationship with registrar Diane Lloyd, and takes a new job working on AAU. When Robbie joyrides in a colleague's car, Steve chases him and is involved in a car accident, later dying from his injuries.

==== Dean West ====
Paul Henshall plays Dean West, a fourth year medical student who appears in Holby City from series seven, episode 29 until series nine, episode 24. The character has cerebral palsy and was introduced to the show as part of the BBC's commitment to diversity on television, with series producer Emma Turner explaining: "The BBC aims to make Holby City truly representative of its audience and Paul is an essential ingredient of that." Henshall, who became the first disabled actor to feature permanently in a TV series, was cast after applying for the BBC's Talent Scheme, which also won him a role in the eighteenth series of sister show Casualty. The role of Dean was created specifically for Henshall, who describes the character as: "cheeky but kind hearted. He's probably not really as confident as he appears." Dean's storylines concentrate on his attempts to progress in his career despite his disability, and his friendship with fellow medical student Matt Parker. After falling out with Matt, Dean leaves to pursue a career opportunity in psychiatry. While Henshall stated: "I never attempt to play Dean as a 'disabled character'. I just try to make him as real as I can as a person", upon his departure from the series, he commented: "I would have liked to see Dean doing more on the show and not always making mistakes and being a scapegoat. I wasn't happy that I'd seen myself described as being 'brought in to honour the BBC's commitment to disabled actors'; if Dean had done more on the show, they would have been able to talk about my storylines." With regards to public reception of the character, Henshall stated: "I get a lot of positive responses about Dean. Some are from disabled people who see Dean as an inspiration and some from people who just think he's a great character."

==== Gemma Wilde ====
Ty Glaser plays F1 Gemma Wilde, who joined the show in the fifteenth series episode "Push the Button (Part 2)". She departed during the following series.

==== Chrissie Williams ====
Tina Hobley plays ward sister Chrissie Williams, the longest serving main character to date, having appeared in the programme since its third series. Chrissie is presented as a classic "maneater", with major storylines focusing around her affairs with colleagues Alistair Taylor, Owen Davis, Ed Keating, Mubbs Hussein, Michael Beauchamp and Sam Strachan. The character was written out of the series for a month in 2006, when Hobley was suspended for breaking her contractual agreement with the BBC not to appear on any other shows whilst starring in Holby City. She returned in 2007, though was again temporarily written out whilst Hobley took maternity leave following the birth of her second daughter. Chrissie returned briefly in October 2008, before returning again in the February 2009 episode "Take Her Breath Away".

==== Mark Williams ====
Robert Powell plays consultant nurse Mark Williams, who arrives in Holby City in the series seven episode "Stick or Twist", as an addition to the series' existing Williams family, consisting of his daughter, Chrissie and wife Tricia. Powell commented that he took the role of Mark as: "I've never done a drama series of this kind before. It's great fun being allowed to develop a character over years rather than weeks." Mark's major storylines center around his relationship with his family, having to deal with Tricia's breast cancer, the revelation that Chrissie is not his biological daughter, and Tricia's death in a road traffic accident. In the aftermath of Tricia's death, Mark is seen to battle a cocaine addiction – a storyline criticised by the media for its surrealism. Mark is now the CEO of the hospital after being involved in a new relationship with Judith Marchant.

==== Tricia Williams ====
Sharon Maughan plays Tricia Williams, a staff nurse and the mother of ward sister Chrissie Williams, who appears from series five, episode 27 until series nine, episode six.

==== Bernie Wolfe ====
Berenice "Bernie" Wolfe, played by Jemma Redgrave, made her first appearance during the series eighteen episode "Serenity" on. The character and Redgrave's casting was announced on 3 September 2015. She was initially contracted for six months. Of Redgrave's casting, producer Oliver Kent stated, "When we dreamed up the character of Bernie Wolfe, we immediately thought of Jemma Redgrave and we were utterly thrilled when she agreed to join the Holby Company. Bernie Wolfe will be a force to be reckoned with and I can't wait to see her locking horns with our established regulars on the wards" Bernie was initially introduced as a patient before she took up a role as a general surgeon on the Keller ward. She later joins AAU and begins a relationship with Serena Campbell (Catherine Russell).

Bernie and Serena have a long-distance relationship after Serena's departure from Holby, following her daughter's death. When the Trauma Unit is closed, Bernie leaves to work in Nairobi. The couple are reunited during a surprise visit from Bernie to Serena at Holby. Bernie asks Serena to come with her as co-lead to Nairobi, but the birth of Serena's grand-niece Guinivere puts an end to those plans. They almost break up, but Serena asks Bernie to wait for her, which Bernie agrees to do. Bernie returns for Jason Haynes' (Jules Robertson) wedding, and later offers to give up Nairobi to come home. Bernie guesses that something happened between Serena and F1 Leah Faulkner (Hannah Daniels). She forgives Serena, but they decide to separate after Jason's wedding, as Serena refuses to keep Bernie from her love of adventure, while Bernie admits she can imagine Serena in a domestic setting, just not with her.

=== Y ===
==== Nic Yorke ====
Liam Garrigan plays Keller staff nurse Nic Yorke, who appears from series five, episode 36 until series six, episode 13. Nic is the brother of "Keller Killer" Kelly Yorke. Unaware that his sister is responsible for numerous patient deaths, he has a brief romance with staff nurse Sandy Harper, and is disappointed when she left Holby for Australia, to be with her old flame Danny Shaughnessy. Nic is accidentally killed when his sister causes a gas explosion.

==== Kelly Yorke ====
Rachel Leskovac plays staff nurse Kelly Yorke, who appears from series five, episode 39, until series six, episode 17. Kelly is revealed to be a serial killer, responsible for multiple deaths on Keller ward. She kills herself after causing her brother Nic's death in an explosion.

==== Maddy Young ====
Nadine Lewington plays SHO Maddy Young, introduced in the series nine episode "Face Value", as a sidekick to, and old friend of established character Dan Clifford. The character's storylines see her embark on a short-lived romance with Dan, and address hidden family secrets, including treating her escaped convict father, and attempting to help her heroin addict twin sister cover up the death of her daughter from a methadone overdose. The character proved popular with fans, and was long-listed for the "Most Popular Newcomer" award at the 2007 National Television Awards, as well as voted Holby City fans' "Favourite Newcomer" of series nine. However, in October 2007, the character came under criticism from drinks industry body the Portman Group, resulting from an incident of on-screen binge drinking, which the group lambasted as "highly irresponsible." Maddy departs from the serial in series eleven after being stabbed to death by one of her sister's prison enemies.

== Recurring characters ==
=== Thandie Abebe-Griffin ===
Ginny Holder plays general surgical registrar Thandie-Abebe Griffin. She first appears in the series 9 episode "Stargazer" as the new fiancé of consultant Ric Griffin (Hugh Quarshie), having become engaged to him during his sabbatical in Uganda. Thandie struggles as a doctor, and has Ric write her a reference when her real one proves uncomplimentary. She accuses cardiothoracic consultant Elliot Hope (Paul Bradley) of racial discrimination when he comments on her poor performance. On her wedding day, it is revealed that Thandie never actually qualified as a doctor, and Ric breaks up with her, escorting her back to Uganda.

Thandie returns in series 12, hired as a locum cardiothoracic registrar. She makes amends with Elliot, though clashes with Ric, who files for divorce. Ric attempts to stop Thandie from being hired at the hospital on a permanent basis; however, when she is investigated by the Home Office, he realises he still has feelings for her. Quarshie explained that upon Thandie's return, Ric initially believes her to be a "terrible person"; however, he ultimately realises that he has been allowing his emotions to interfere with his work, and when Thandie correctly diagnoses a patient, he is impressed to realise that he has underestimated her medical ability. He and Thandie renew their relationship, until Thandie's terminally ill brother arrives and requests that Thandie euthanise him. Holder has commented that Thandie is "horrified" by his request, but ultimately complies out of mercy. Thandie's decision ends her relationship with Ric, as her husband is: "a man of principle" who "doesn't agree with what she's done, but he does understand." Thandie then hands in her resignation and returns to Uganda with her brother's body. Holder has stated that there is a possibility Thandie may return in the future, revealing that she did not expect to return for the show's twelfth series, so could be invited back again.

=== Grace Beauchamp ===
Identical twins Isabella and Scarlett Harrington Clark play Grace Beauchamp, the daughter of Connie Beauchamp (Amanda Mealing) and Sam Strachan (Tom Chambers). She first appears in the series nine episode "Deep Dark Truthful Mirror", broadcast on 1 May 2007. Grace is born seven weeks premature and in the breech position. Connie goes into labour while performing an operation on Lola Griffin (Sharon D. Clarke). Due to her complicated birth, Grace has severe complications and after receiving an ECG displaying minimal brain-stem activity, Connie decides to switch off Grace's life-support machine. While Connie refuses to hold her daughter, Sam decides to hold her. He realises that Grace can breathe unaided, delighting him and Connie. Despite not initially allowing Sam access to his daughter, Connie relents and grants him increased access.

Sam asks his friend Maddy Young (Nadine Lewington) to take care of Grace, but when Maddy leaves her unattended in the office, Susie Prendergast (Kelly Scott) kidnaps Grace, under the impression she is her sister. Susie's father begs Susie to return Grace but she threatens to drop Grace on her head. Sam and Maddy discover she is missing and begin to search for her; Sam begins to panic that she could be kidnapped and taken abroad. They find Susie and persuade her to return Grace, who is handed back to Connie. Months later, Grace falls down a staircase and is badly injured. She is rushed into the Pediatric Intensive Care Unit and undergoes surgery for a collapsed lung, which is successful. Sam later leaves Holby to live in New York. Over a year later, Grace and Connie also leave Holby to care for Connie's ill father. Following Connie's introduction to Holby City's sister show Casualty in 2014, Grace is also introduced into the serial, portrayed by Emily Carey.

=== Michael Beauchamp ===
Anthony Calf plays Michael Beauchamp, chairman of the hospital board and husband of cardiothoracic consultant Connie Beauchamp. He has a marked ruthless streak, on one occasion having his own wife removed from duty to cover up his negligence. He has an affair with ward sister Chrissie Williams, promoting her to matron because of their relationship. His corruption ultimately leads to his downfall. He covers up an outbreak of VRSA, which causes the death of several patients. Connie forces him to unwittingly confess, and Michael is arrested for manslaughter. He spends ten months in prison then is released on appeal.

=== Lord Byrne ===
Ronald Pickup plays Charles, Lord Byrne, a cardiothoracic consultant and the father of registrar Joseph Byrne. He works at Holby General's neighbouring hospital St. Luke's, and holds positions of power within the local medical sphere, including a role on the board of Holby's Trust. He has close ties to the Durant family, and is an old friend of the father of Abra Durant, for whom he finds research work after a brief spell at Holby General. He manipulates Connie Beauchamp to secure Joseph's position at the hospital, and constantly pushes his son to advance his career. His younger son, Harry, attempted suicide whilst a student at medical school, and is in a comatose state for several series before dying. Charles initially encourages the developing relationship between Joseph and general surgical registrar Jac Naylor; however, after a hospital night out, he sleeps with Jac himself and begins an affair. When his wife, Anne-Marie, learns of his infidelity, she ends their marriage. Charles has a heart attack during series nine, and dies following surgery.

=== Lady Byrne ===
Jane Asher plays Anne-Marie, Lady Byrne, the wife of consultant Lord Byrne, and the mother of registrar Joseph Byrne. Anne-Marie first appears in the series nine episode "After the Fall". After making several guest appearances throughout series nine and ten, Asher signed a three-month contract to become a series regular from May 2008 onwards, for a period of 10 episodes. Her initial storyline saw her son's girlfriend, Jac Naylor, embark on an affair with Anne-Marie's own husband – eventually culminating in his death, and leaving the character a widow. Upon her return to Holby City, she takes over Charles' position as Executive Chairman of the Byrne Foundation – a charity committed to research into Cardiac Valve Disease. She also begins a relationship with Joseph's mentor, Elliot Hope, which ends as he is still mourning his deceased wife Gina.

=== Annalese Carson ===
Anna-Louise Plowman plays Annalese Carson, a locum consultant anaesthetist and the wife of general surgeon Michael Spence. Annalese arrives in series 11, discovering that her husband has had an affair with nurse Donna Jackson. Hari Dhillon has revealed of his character's relationship with his wife: "I think Michael and Annalese are complements to each other. They are certainly very different from each other, but they understand one another, and have a deep, loving relationship. I'm starting to realize that Annalese is the one person in the world – along with his children – that Michael truly loves. [...] It would be unimaginable to Michael to envision a world without his wife. He certainly would never try to hurt Annalese deliberately, but he just loves attention from women."

After confronting Michael about his affair, Annalese loses concentration during an operation, leading to the death of a patient. Michael attempts to cover up for her mistake, but in a random breathalyser test, Annalese tests positive for alcohol consumption. When cardiothoracic surgeon Connie Beauchamp discovers the result of the test, she has CEO Jayne Grayson admit Annalese's negligence to the patient's relatives, and Annalese is charged with manslaughter. Although she is acquitted of the charge, she is suspended from work and leaves the hospital, after telling Michael she is pregnant with their fourth child, but is leaving him over his infidelity. Annalese returns briefly in series eleven, when her daughter is admitted to hospital after falling down the stairs. After Michael and colleague Ric Griffin save her life, Annalese and Michael renew their relationship. She later gives birth to a son, Charlie. When Michael announces that Annalese has given birth, he jokingly tells his colleagues that the baby's name is Barack.

A year later, Michael and Annalese are seeing a marriage counsellor, who, during their last session, collapses, having had a cardiac arrest. They get him to the hospital, though Annalese does not turn up to meet Michael after he comes out of surgery. She then throws him out of their home. A few weeks later, having left Michael several messages on his answering machine, Annalese arrives at the hospital and tells him that she wants a divorce. She later begins a relationship with Ric. Annalese later finds out Ric has Cancer.

Annalese returns in Series 14 after not appearing for some time. She announces that she and Michael's children are departing for a new life in America, devastating Michael. Ric attempts to make Michael see that he needs to let her move on, and eventually Michael and Annalese form a fragile truce. In the next episode, Michael's daughter Jasmine comes to Holby to spend the day with her father before their departure.

=== Fleur Fanshawe ===
Fleur Fanshawe, played by Debbie Chazen, made her first appearance during the seventeenth series episode "'Not Waving But Drowning'". Chazen's casting was announced on 19 June 2014, and she was initially contracted for three months. Of joining the cast, the actress stated "I am thrilled to be joining Holby as the outrageous Fleur – she's going to be a lot of fun to play! I can't wait to stir things up on Keller Ward and am looking forward to being able to tell my family that I'm a doctor at last." Fleur is a locum Consultant general surgeon. She is also an old friend of Michael Spence (Hari Dhillon). In March 2018, Chazen confirmed on her personal Twitter account that she had reprised her role. Fleur will return during the twentieth series on 20 June 2018. She is now the hospital's resident obstetrician, and a potential love interest for Serena Campbell (Catherine Russell).

=== Carlos Fashola ===
Carlos Fashola, played by David Bedella, is a plastic surgeon who appears between series six, episode 42 and series seven, episode 35. Carlos developed a relationship with Tricia Williams (Sharon Maughan).

=== Justin Fuller ===
Ben Richards plays physiotherapist Justin Fuller in series eight, from episode 23 to 37.

=== Jayne Grayson ===
Stella Gonet plays CEO Jayne Grayson, who first appears in the series nine episode "Under the Radar". Gonet's casting as Jayne was announced on 15 June 2007, when Gonet said of joining the cast of Holby City: "I am absolutely delighted to be hiring and firing at Holby." The BBC describe Jayne as "a witty and ambitious go-getter who strives relentlessly to achieve her aims", but who "thinks of herself as Solomon." Jayne's first official act as Holby City Hospital's new CEO is to investigate a fabricated racial discrimination allegation made against consultant cardiothoracic surgeon Elliot Hope by staff surgeon Thandie Abebe – making her immediately unpopular amongst the staff. In episode "The Q Word", it is revealed that prior to arriving at Holby, Jayne worked as a management consultant, and that when asked for help by her own father with his struggling business, she dismissed him from his position and took control of the company herself in a hostile takeover. In episode "Temporary Insanity", Jayne furthers her growing unpopularity amongst the staff by again turning down Abra Durant and Ric Griffin's proposals for charity operations at night. In July 2008, Jayne convinces the hospital's board of directors to create a director of surgery post. She has Connie Beauchamp and Ric Griffin apply for the job, secretly pitting them against each other by professing to support each of them. However, Jayne is successful in keeping the immigrant Tan family at Holby to have their baby rather than being deported back to a nation where they would be killed.

=== Keith Greene ===
Alex Macqueen plays Keith Greene, a consultant anaesthetist who is constantly maligned within the show for his poor sense of humour and irritable temper. He has featured in Holby City since its seventh series, becoming the show's Head of Anaesthetics following the departure of Zubin Khan. In episode "The Key Is Fear", Keith is verbally abused by a drunken Stuart McElroy, who surmises him to be an "obsequious, supercilious, insipid four-eyed toss-pot." In the episode "Breathe Deeply", Greene collapses during surgery after becoming contaminated by a toxin from a patient. It causes him to stop breathing, resulting in him being intubated, though he goes on to make a full recovery. He tells Joseph Byrne that he was formerly married but Mrs. Greene divorced him. Greene applies for the director of surgery job, clashing with Connie Beauchamp; however, neither of them gets the position, which instead goes to general surgical consultant Michael Spence.

Macqueen departed the show in 2010 to concentrate on other acting projects.

=== Jason Haynes ===
Jason Haynes, played by Jules Robertson, made his first appearance in the eighteenth series episode "A Partnership, Literally", broadcast on 9 February 2016. Robertson auditioned for the role in 2015 and competed with several actors for the part. The actor, who has autism, said "I was really apprehensive but tinged with pride that I had been given this great opportunity. I was nervous about the challenge and did not know whether I would enjoy it but I was determined to do my best." Jason was introduced as the nephew of Serena Campbell (Catherine Russell). After Serena learned that her long-lost sister was dead, she emailed Jason asking to meet him and he turned up at Holby during Serena's shift. Jason has Asperger syndrome and Serena tries to understand his condition in the hope that they can build a relationship. Robertson described Jason as "really nice and sensitive with a deadpan sense of humour and a genuine desire to do good". He also said Jason's Asperger's causes him to take things said to him literally, which does cause problems for him and Serena. Robertson added that his character was "more geeky and shy" than himself.

=== Gina Hope ===
Gillian Bevan plays Gina Hope, the wife of cardiothoracic consultant Elliot Hope, and mother of James and Martha Hope. Gina has motor neuron disease, and as her condition deteriorates, she becomes increasingly bleak in her outlook – at one point having a DNR put on her records, which Elliot directly defies. When she collapses at home, he enlists Martha and registrar Joseph Byrne to aid him in fitting Gina with a tracheotomy against her express wishes. Although Gina thanks him for saving her, she soon returns to losing the will to continue. She refuses experimental treatment in Singapore, and after befriending Connie Beauchamp, goes away to Switzerland to commit assisted suicide. She changes her mind about not telling Elliot at the last minute, and he flies to Switzerland to join her as she ends her life. Gina's death occurs in series eight, episode 52, though the character reappears in series ten in a fantasy sequence in the episode Elliot's Wonderful Life.

=== Martha Hope ===
Holly Lucas plays Martha Hope, the daughter and youngest child of Gina and Elliot Hope, and sister of James Hope. She first appears in Holby City in the episode "Quality Time", when she discovers her mother has motor neuron disease. When Gina goes into respiratory arrest, she assists her father and Joseph Byrne in resuscitating her and surgically fitting a tracheotomy, against Gina's express wishes. After her mother's suicide, Martha relies heavily on Joseph, developing a crush on him much to the irritation of his girlfriend, Jac Naylor. She begins working in the hospital as a Healthcare Assistant, supporting her father through his grief. However, Elliot succeeds in convincing his daughter to return to university in the episode "Can't Buy Me Love". In series ten, episode nine, Martha is shot in the arm by STI nurse Tim, and is trapped in a lift with Chrissie when they try to escape. She survives, however, and returns in the eleventh series, having married in Las Vegas in secret.

=== Bradley Hume ===
Scott Adkins plays Bradley Hume, the assistant general manager of the Holby City Hospital PCT, who appears in series eight from episode 32 to 52.

=== Fredrik Johanssen ===
Fredrik Johanssen, played by Billy Postlethwaite, is a general surgical registrar and Henrik Hanssen's (Guy Henry) son. He appears in the nineteenth series. Series producer Kate Hall noted that Postlethwaite and Henry are physically similar, which made it look like they are related. Upon his arrival at Holby, Fredrik is "desperate" to reconnect with his father. He also forms "a jealous rivalry" with junior doctor Dominic Copeland (David Ames). Fredrik later goes on a shooting spree around the hospital. He shoots Jac Naylor (Rosie Marcel) in the back, while Oliver Valentine (James Anderson) is shot in the head. Raf di Lucca (Joe McFadden) dies after being shot in the neck. Hanssen tries to reason with his son, but Fredrik is shot dead by armed police. A reporter for The People branded Fredrik "sinister".

=== Ed Loftwood ===
Graeme Garden plays recurring character Ed Loftwood, a cardiothoracic consultant and Clinical Lead at the hospital. He encourages Alex Adams to return to the hospital following his departure, and also has lab technician Reg Lund on his firm for a time. He opposes Connie Beauchamp's planned expansion of Darwin ward; however, he still recommends that she apply for his Clinical Lead position upon his retirement. Loftwood steps down from the position, but remains at the hospital in a surgical capacity.

=== Reg Lund ===
Martin Hancock plays Reg Lund, a medical researcher and registrar who appears from series seven, episode 37 until series eight, episode 32. He works in the hospital lab alongside Diane Lloyd, and explains to her that while he had been technically competent as a registrar, he found it hard to summon the people skills to work with patients, resulting in a number of fatalities. However, on several occasions he is able to aid both Diane and Abra Durant in emergency operations, and eventually moves to work on the Acute Assessment Unit. While there, he develops a crush on nurse Donna Jackson, which goes unreciprocated. He confesses his love to her and attempts to convince her that her boyfriend, manager Bradley Hume, does not really care for her. Although Donna eventually breaks up with Bradley, she explains to Reg that she values him as a friend and nothing more.

=== Vanessa Lytton ===
Leslie Ash plays CEO Vanessa Lytton. Vanessa arrives in the episode "The Spirit Dancing" – series eleven, episode 52 of the programme, replacing former CEO Jayne Grayson. Ash was cast in the role after a five-year break from acting, due to complications arising from MRSA. As Ash is disabled, Vanessa walks with the aid of a walking stick. Ash has praised Holby City producers for their willingness to cast a disabled actress as Vanessa who is a "scheming", "conniving and calculated" executive, whose storylines see her clash with several members of the hospital's senior staff.

=== Judith Marchant ===
Shelagh McLeod plays clinical matron Judith Marchant. She initially clashes with consultant nurse Mark Williams, though they become closer when Mark supports her during a hard day. Mark's daughter Chrissie starts dislikes Judith when she discovers she suggested Mark be made redundant and they later clash when Chrissie accuses her of embarrassing her in front of her nurses. When Judith's son Connor is admitted to the hospital with alcohol poisoning, her ex-husband Paul arrives and blames Judith for not informing him sooner. Mark is hostile towards him and annoys Judith by interfering, so Mark then talks to Paul and they reach a truce, and Judith and Mark are friends again and decide to meet up on boxing day. Judith and Mark begin a romantic relationship. She loses her job when CEO Vanessa Lytton requires a scapegoat for a hospital scandal, and Judith decides to move to Manchester, where Paul is moving with Connor. She later returned in March to get a reference from Vanessa for another job. The reference is useless and Mark has been preoccupied with Daisha and has not taken the time to talk to Vanessa as he promised Judith he was. After a small confrontation they agree to meet in the cafe. When Mark does not turn up because he is with Daisha, Judith leaves a voicemail telling him it is over between them; she can not be second best again, and leaves for Manchester that night.

=== Isaac Mayfield ===
Isaac Mayfield, played by Marc Elliott, made his first appearance in the eighteenth series episode "The Lone Ranger", broadcast on 23 June 2016. The character and Elliott's casting was announced on 12 April 2016. He was initially contracted for six months. Elliott, was best known for playing Syed Masood in EastEnders, had his trademark long hair cut off before his audition for the role. Of his casting, Elliott said "I'm pleased to be joining the team and looking forward to playing this complex, flawed character." Isaac is a general surgeon, who joins the Keller ward staff. He has a very charming but manipulative personality. He also became a love interest for Dominic "Dom" Copeland (David Ames). The characters became subject to an issue-led story about domestic violence in same-sex relationships when Isaac began physically and emotionally abusing Dom. Elliott knew about the story during the casting process and was excited at playing a villain as he had not played one before. He described Isaac as "sociopath" and "psycho" who enjoys being powerful over other people. Elliott explained that Isaac hides his manipulative nature by imitating other behaviours and is abusive towards Dom because he is able to, which he deemed "twisted".

Isaac begins to manipulate Dom as he is grieving for his best friend, Arthur Digby (Rob Ostlere), and following a series of emotional abuse, Dom decides to leave the relationship, so Isaac physically attacks him instead. Elliott told Victoria Wilson of What's on TV that Isaac chooses to become violent with Dom when he evaluates that his psychological abuse of Dom is "not enough". The violence within the relationships continues after the first attack. The first attack on Dom was deemed too violent so the show's post-production team had to cut out any painful noises from the attack. In the filming, Elliott had to kick Ames hard in the stomach, although Ames used a protective cushion to prevent any harm towards him. Elliott and Ames disliked filming the scenes and were "shell-shocked" during filming breaks. Writers later feature Dom confronting Isaac about his violent behaviour, which Elliott pointed out that Isaac dislikes, something he associated with being "a classic trait of a sociopath". The actor explained that Isaac is not empathetic and views his relationship with Dom as "a nasty, devious game". He added that Isaac has no "emotional attachment" to Dom.

The storyline concluded in scenes first broadcast in April 2017, which also marked Elliott's departure from Holby City. For the conclusion, producers reintroduced Dom's former boyfriend, Kyle Greenham (Alan Morrisey), for one episode. Despite Kyle returning with a new partner, Isaac is jealous of Kyle's history with Dom and sees him as an "obstacle" and a "threat", which he needs to remove to isolate Dom and maintain control. Elliott stated that Isaac focuses on "competitiveness and one-upmanship". The story climaxes when Dom falls down the stairs during an argument with Isaac. Writers decided not to have Isaac pushing Dom and instead, focused on Dom's fear of Isaac, which causes him to step backwards and fall down the stairs. Elliott thought that in the scene, Isaac is portrayed as "threatening", "intimidating" and "menacing". Dom then reports Isaac's abuse and reveals the extensive off-screen abuse he has received from Isaac, resulting in his suspension. Elliott found it "powerful" to see one violent attack on-screen rather than multiple and thought that it highlighted how domestic abuse victims can hide their suffering.

Elliott reprised the role in 2019 and Isaac will return in episodes first broadcast in May 2019. His return was announced, via a show trailer advertising upcoming stories, on 6 March 2019. The trailer previews Isaac and Dom meeting again. Ames later confirmed that Elliott would be appearing in multiple episodes. He told Lorraine Kelly on daytime talkshow Lorraine that Isaac's return would "[throw] a cat amongst the pigeons". Ames later revealed in an interview with Sophie Dainty of Digital Spy that Isaac would return after Dom decides he wants him to answer some questions. The actor explained, "In order to reconstruct his life, Dom has to deconstruct it all first. [...] Isaac is a big part of that." He also thought that it would be good for Isaac to understand how Dom's life has changed since their relationship ended.

=== Tom O'Dowd ===
Jalaal Hartley appears in Holby City series ten and eleven as Tom O'Dowd, a friend of Leo Griffin, Ric's son. He is a heroin addict who dropped out of medical school, but re-enrols after Leo dies from an overdose. He works at Holby General as a student doctor, but begins using drugs again. Ric tells his father about his drug abuse, and Tom is disinherited in his will. When his father dies, Tom departs from the hospital.

=== Kieron Patel ===
Kieron Patel is the long-lost son of Sam Strachan (Tom Chambers). He was born when his parents were 17 years old, as a result he was brought up by his grandparents thinking his mum was his sister. Kieron comes to Holby and he meets Maria Kendall and his father. Kieron falls in love with Maria, creating a love triangle with Maria and Dad Sam. In the episode Maria's Christmas Carol, it shows Maria's past, present and future. In Maria's future it shows three years later that Maria has moved to the States and married Sam and is expecting his child. For three years Kieron did not play his violin because he lost all his passion for it when Maria broke his heart. He smashes it in anger when Maria tells him that she only ever loved him as a son. After running out of the apartment he deliberately steps out in front of a truck. Kieron is rushed to hospital with serious injuries and flatlines while on the operating table. Maria tells Sam that she cannot be with him because of Kieron's feelings for her and she does not want to be responsible for coming between Sam and his son, especially as he has such a distant relationship with his daughter Grace. Without knowing how his father feels about Maria, Kieron and Sam leave for the United States.

=== Paul Rose ===
Andrew Lewis plays recurring anaesthetist Paul Rose, the longest serving recurring character in Holby City to date. He first appears in series three, episode three. For his early appearances, Paul uses a wheelchair; however, he later returns non-disabled. The character's recovery mirrored the Lewis's real-life paralysis, which saw him able to regain the use of his legs after four years of physiotherapy, following a motorbike accident. Although Paul's disability and subsequent recovery are never directly addressed on screen, Lewis has revealed that the writers originally intended to cover it in depth, and idea which was later discarded so as not to "trivialise the subject for those viewers who spend their whole lives in wheelchairs".

=== Tara Sodi ===
Meera Syal plays Tara Sodi, a cardiothoracic consultant who first appears in the series eleven episode "Attachments". She is an old university friend of Elliot Hope's, with whom she co-created a pioneering medical technique which resulted in the death of a child. Tara is described as "a prickly character" who rubs other doctors the wrong way. She was created to add a comedic presence to the series following the departure of Adrian Edmondson as Abra Durant. In preparation for the role, Syal observed real surgeons performing several operations. Tara arrives in Holby as a surprise for Elliot, who is celebrating his 50th birthday. She convinces him to attempt to repeat their pioneering medical technique on another child. Elliot initially refuses, but later changes his mind. The operation is successful and, impressed with Tara's experience and commitment to work, Jayne Grayson offers her a full-time contract. When Tara refuses to respect a patient's DNR order, she re-considers her future at the hospital, but is convinced to stay by Elliot, with whom she shares a kiss.

=== Christopher Sutherland ===
Patrick Toomey plays recurring character Christopher Sutherland, who holds a managerial position at the hospital. He offers a consultancy position to Abra Durant, which he almost immediately revokes when Abra proved uncompliant with the will of the board – opposing Sutherland's plans to reserve one operating theatre for emergency cases only. He is instrumental in Abra's departure – hiring Dan Clifford to uncover the corruption he suspects within the general surgery department. He also convinces Connie Beauchamp not to leave Holby for Sweden by securing extra funding for the cardiothoracic department. He is seen to pit rival surgeons Dan Clifford and Ric Griffin against one another upon Ric's return from a sabbatical in Uganda. Towards the end of his tenure, he fires Lola Griffin after she proves resistant to hectic AAU workloads and attempts to cause drama in the local press about departmental overcrowding. When Sutherland refuses to pay for agency nurses, leading to a work to rule day amongst the nursing staff, Elliot Hope calls a vote of no confidence against him, and he is subsequently dismissed and replaced by Jayne Grayson.

=== Derwood Thompson ===
Derwood "Mr T" Thompson, played by Ben Hull, made his first screen appearance in the fourteenth series episode "Stepping Up To The Plate", broadcast on 3 July 2012. Hull was originally supposed to appear in one episode and was initially named Jake Thompson but his name changed when he became a recurring cast member. He explained "I actually popped in and did one episode and they asked me to do another, then three, then six or nine." Mr T is an obstetrician and gynaecologist, who is "hapless" around women. Hull said his character was "jokey and fun". Bill Gibb for The Sunday Post observed that Mr T had become popular with viewers. After a long-running 'will they/won't they' relationship with Mo Effanga and an attempt to conceive a baby together as friends, Mr T almost married a bank nurse, Inga Olsen. Mo had lied to him and Inga, telling them that she was not carrying his baby when she in fact was. Inga faked a pregnancy to trap Mr T as she knew that he was in love with Mo and believed Mo felt the same for him. Mo told Derwood's mother who announced it to the entire wedding and Mo later went into labour at the reception, letting Derwood know that he was delivering his own son, Hector.

Derwood and Mo left together a few months later after Mo was offered a job in London.

=== Bonnie Wallis ===
Bonnie Wallis, played by Carlyss Peer, made her first screen appearance in the fifteenth series episode "Like a Prayer", broadcast on 8 October 2013. Bonnie was initially an agency nurse, but soon became staff nurse on Darwin. Bonnie began dating Jonny Maconie (Michael Thomson) and developed a rivalry with Jac Naylor (Rosie Marcel), who later gave birth to Jonny's daughter. Peer believed that Jonny did love Bonnie, but knew that she knew Jac would always have a place in Jonny's life because of their daughter. Jonny and Bonnie eventually became engaged, and Peer thought marriage would give the couple security. On the day of the wedding, Bonnie is killed after she crosses the road without looking and is hit by a truck. Peer revealed that she always knew Bonnie would be killed off at the end of her contract.
