= Holby City series 4 =

Season of television series

Holby City
- Series 4
- No. of episodes: 52

Release
- Original network: BBC One
- Original release: 9 October 2001 – 1 October 2002

Series chronology
- ← Previous; Series 3 Next → Series 5

The fourth series of the British medical drama television series Holby City commenced airing in the United Kingdom on BBC One on 9 October 2001, and concluded on 1 October 2002. The episode run for this series was actually commissioned for 26 episodes, however a further 26 episodes were given the go ahead and were bolted onto the end of Series 4 resulting in a 52-episode series run. In essence, it is a combination of two separate series, but classed as one. From here on, each series was commissioned as a full 52-episode run.

== Reception ==
In 2002, the BBC was condemned by critics who felt that the network "no longer believed it had a duty to shape public taste." David Cox of The New Statesman commented that this became clear during the 2001 Christmas schedule, when BBC One scheduled Holby City against a contemporary version of Othello. On this basis, Cox advocated the abolition of the licence fee, explaining: "The BBC was invented in a period when the elite decided what the population should know. If that has gone, then the licence fee should go, too."

== Cast ==
=== Main characters ===
- Ian Aspinall as Mubbs Hussein (from episode 8)
- Luisa Bradshaw-White as Lisa Fox (from episode 13)
- Colette Brown as Sam Kennedy (until episode 45)
- Peter de Jersey as Steve Waring
- Jeremy Edwards as Danny Shaughnessy
- Tina Hobley as Chrissie Williams
- George Irving as Anton Meyer (until episode 46)
- Thusitha Jayasundera as Tash Bandara (until episode 37)
- Dominic Jephcott as Alistair Taylor (episodes 1−46)
- Verona Joseph as Jess Griffin (from episode 15)
- Denis Lawson as Tom Campbell-Gore (from episode 45)
- Adrian Lewis Morgan as Liam Evans (until episode 35)
- Rocky Marshall as Ed Keating (from episode 45)
- Mark Moraghan as Owen Davis (from episode 3)
- Anna Mountford as Keri McGrath (until episode 41)
- David Paisley as Ben Saunders (from episode 17)
- Jan Pearson as Kath Shaughnessy
- Patricia Potter as Diane Lloyd (from episode 39)
- Hugh Quarshie as Ric Griffin (from episode 1)
- Siobhan Redmond as Janice Taylor (until episode 44)
- Laura Sadler as Sandy Harper
- Paul Shane as Stan Ashleigh (until episode 20)
- Jeremy Sheffield as Alex Adams

=== Recurring characters ===
- Jan Anderson as Chloe Hill (episode 1)
- Tilly Blackwood as Emma Waring (until episode 10)
- Christopher Colquhoun as Simon Kaminski (episode 43)
- Hari Dhillon as Sunil Gupta
- Andrew Dunn as Simon Shaughnessy (episodes 8−52)
- Kulvinder Ghir as Anil Banerjee
- Marvin Humes as Robbie Waring
- Ian Kelsey as Patrick Spiller (episode 11)
- Martin Ledwith as Father Michael (episodes 8-33)
- Deborah Poplett as Anna Chandler
- Zita Sattar as Anna Paul (episode 28)
- Ana Sofrenovic as Marija Ovcar (episodes 1–16)
- David Soul as Alan Fletcher (episode 27)
- Christine Stephen-Daly as Lara Stone (episodes 28 and 31)
- Denise Welch as Pam McGrath (episodes 36–41)

== Episodes ==
No. overall	No. in series	Title	Directed by	Written by	Original release date	Viewers (millions)
56	1	"Rogue Males"	Nigel Douglas	Al Hunter Ashton	9 October 2001	8.92
Ric Griffin arrives to replace Mike Barratt. Meyer is involved in a road accident with serious injuries. The wife of the other accident victim is seen by Alex driving around in Meyer's car. He investigates. First appearance of Ric Griffin
57	2	"Ghosts"	Mike Cocker	Tony McHale	16 October 2001	8.06
After Ric Griffin removes the bullet from Meyer's spine, Meyer proves to be a troublesome patient. During Sandy's 20th birthday party, Keri and Liam get into a regretful situation. Danny tries to help an illegal immigrant.
58	3	"Men Are from Mars"	Nigel Douglas	Colin Wyatt	23 October 2001	7.66
Keri thinks she was raped by Liam, and Janice catches her taking the morning- after pill. Liam returns Keri's necklace and acts like nothing is wrong. A 14-year-old boy Ben makes sexual innuendos towards Keri, and slaps her. Illegal immigrant Maria leaves the hospital with her child.
59	4	"Things Can Only Get Better"	John Alexander	Joe Fraser	30 October 2001	8.42
A woman who has waited for a year to have surgery jumps the queue by going to the newspapers. Janice announces at a dinner party that she is pregnant. Liam questions Keri why she is being so cold towards him after they slept together. She tells him that he raped her. Steve pulls him aside, and Janice takes Keri to her office for questioning.
60	5	"Reflected Truth"	John Alexander	Martin Jameson	6 November 2001	8.52
Danny has an emergency and does not show up as a witness against Liam. Liam thinks Danny is siding with him. Maria has run away from the hospital again, but this time she leaves her son and Danny goes to look for her. Sandy is no help in her testimony. During a break, Liam follows Keri into the bathroom and pleads with her not to go through with it, still not admitting any guilt.
61	6	"Starting Over"	Mike Cocker	Lisa Evans	13 November 2001	8.32
A bus driver is devastated that he hit a pedestrian. Meanwhile, the pedestrian is also in the hospital across from his room and tells the staff that it was a suicide attempt. The driver's friend overhears this and confronts him.
62	7	"Mother Knows Best"	James Cellan Jones	Dan Sefton	20 November 2001	8.24
After Janice loses the baby, Alistair asks her to wait before trying again. Chrissie offers him a shoulder to cry on. Danny approaches social services to see whether Maria can stay in the country. Liam and Sandy are annoyed at Danny for letting Maria move in with them.
63	8	"Forgiveness of Sins"	James Cellan Jones	Nick Warburton	27 November 2001	8.06
It is Danny and Maria's wedding day. Kath has one last go to try to stop the sham wedding. A young girl has an inoperable tumour, and Keri tells her she is dying before her parents do.
64	9	"Woman in the Dark"	Ian Knox	Andrew Holden	4 December 2001	8.81
A convict with a brain tumour offers her liver to a dying girl. She murdered her own daughter, and wants to make amends before she dies. Danny is starting to regret his marriage to Maria.
65	10	"Care"	Jim Goddard	Rob Fraser	11 December 2001	8.33
Steve leaves Robbie to look after his wife, Emma, and she has an accident with tragic results. Alex and Sam sort out their differences. A blind man gets his sight back after surgery on his stomach. Meyer investigates this "miracle".
66	11	"It's a Family Affair"	Julie Anne Robinson	Chris Jury	18 December 2001	8.45
Maria finally kisses Danny. A heart patient has two wives who do not know about each other. Steve's son Robbie is rushed to hospital with alcohol poisoning. Steve and Robbie come to terms with Emma's death. Alistair professes love for Chrissie and she breaks it off. We see Chrissie's name badge under the bed where Janice is lying.
67	12	"'Twas the Night..."	Jim Goddard	Jane Hollowood	23 December 2001	7.69
A rugby player gets a broken leg in a match; he dies from a brain bleed. After investigating, it is revealed that his best friend punched him in the head and caused it. Janice finds Chrissie's name badge and confronts Alistair, but he weasels his way out of it. He gives her the necklace that he bought for Chrissie. Janice is pregnant.
68	13	"Shadow of a Doubt, Part One"	Keith Boak	Neil McKay	31 December 2001	6.57
At the new year's eve party, Alex leaves early, but promises to get back to Sam. While he is gone, he saves a man in a road traffic accident, and runs over a little boy. The police give him a breathalyzer and he fails. Sam is annoyed that he did not come back. A former girlfriend brings her little girl to the hospital and Alex thinks she may be his daughter. Alistair starts annoying Chrissie, and she rejects him again.
69	14	"Shadow of a Doubt, Part Two"	Keith Boak	Neil McKay	8 January 2002	8.47
Alex cannot figure out why he was positive when he had only one drink two hours before the test. Sam seems to know something about it. The little boy Alex ran down dies, and his parents find out he was considered drunk. They threaten to sue. Alistair is ready to leave Janice, and in the car park he physically tries to throw Chrissie into her car. A fight breaks out with Owen over Chrissie, and Janice witnesses it; she then sees his packed bag in their car, and leaves without him.
70	15	"Trust"	Ian Knox	Stuart Morris	15 January 2002	8.04
Chrissie and Alistair's affair becomes public because of Alastair and Owen's fight. A little boy needs a bone marrow transplant, but neither of his parents is a match. His mother calls her ex-boyfriend who happens to be her husband's best friend. At Luka's birthday party, Kath is worried about Simon's drinking. Maria's ex shows up and Danny gets the sofa. In a drunken rage, Simon hits Kath.
71	16	"Hello Goodbye"	Julie Anne Robinson	Helen Greaves	22 January 2002	7.62
Danny sees Kath's black eye and beats up his father. Maria has to choose between Danny and her ex-husband, Goran. Sam admits to Chrissie that she spiked Alex's drink at the new year's eve party.
72	17	"Life Goes On"	Indra Bhose	Anji Loman Field	29 January 2002	7.62
Sandy meets a new guy, Ben, at a club, only to find out that he is due to start work at Holby City tomorrow, as a midwife. A cancer patient finds out that he is going to die before the birth of his baby. His wife decides to induce her labour so he can see his child before he dies. Danny makes up with Kath for hitting Simon.
73	18	"All My Sins"	Indra Bhose	Joe Fraser	5 February 2002	7.70
Chrissie tells Sam that she will tell Alex that Sam spiked his drinks. Sam goes to Alex, and as she is about to tell him, he tells her he loves her. A man who was a bully at school gets a bed next to a man who was his victim, with unfortunate results.
74	19	"Secrets and Lies"	Jim Goddard	James Stevenson	12 February 2002	8.00
Alex's court case has arrived. Fran lies about her son's accident. Alex breaks down on the stand, and during the recess, Sam tells him what she did. She then begs Fran to tell the truth, and tells her she spiked the drinks.
75	20	"The Love that Binds"	Jim Goddard	Sharon Morris	19 February 2002	7.21
Stan's wife collapses in the car park and is admitted. Sam swears off men. Chloe, a young girl with learning disabilities, is about to have a hysterectomy, but it is her mother's decision.
76	21	"Choose Life"	Russell England	Al Hunter Ashton	26 February 2002	7.07
Alex tries to get Sam fired by telling Meyer about the spiked drink. Meyer will not do it because she was off duty. Ben decides to invite his parents for dinner to tell them he is gay. He asks Sandy to come for moral support. Sandy recognises them from the cancer ward.
77	22	"To Have and Have Not"	James Strong	Janys Chambers	5 March 2002	6.99
Kath is embarrassed by her black eye. She meets a patient who she thinks is being abused by her husband, and tries to convince her to go to the police. The woman will not admit he hits her. Ric Griffin finds out that the college money he gave his daughter Jess has been used for breast enhancement and she wants more money for a modelling career. He cuts her off and tells her to get a real job and earn it.
78	23	"Fathers and Sons"	James Strong	Nick Warburton	12 March 2002	6.96
Kath is helping Fr Chambers with Communion and is late home. Simon gets really angry about it. Tash gets pricked by a heroin needle in her new girlfriend's purse. She breaks off with her and the girl begs her to help her quit. Kath is lying on the floor with a bloody face, and calls an ambulance before passing out. Danny is called when Kath is admitted, and swears he will kill his father. He is about to do just that when there is someone at the door.
79	24	"Cruel to Be Kind"	Russell England	Andrew Holden	19 March 2002	6.53
Kath leaves Simon, and gets Danny to pick up her belongings. Fr Chambers and Danny paint and decorate her new place while she is at work. A woman wants to leave the man that cared for her and raised her two sons, for another man, who happens to be her husband's much younger employee.
80	25	"Gamblers"	Julie Anne Robinson	Al Hunter Ashton	26 March 2002	7.59
A woman wants to abandon her little boy because the doctors gave him a transfusion. She considers her son impure now and does not want him. Tash gets her HIV test results from the needle prick.
81	26	"Birthday"	Julie Anne Robinson	Martin Jameson	2 April 2002	6.51
Sam invites Alex to her birthday party, but he declines. He meets Jess in a bar, and she takes him to the party. He finds out Jess is Ric's daughter and she is flatmates with Sam. A fight breaks out with Steve and his old friend. Police officers arrive, and Ric calls them racist; he gets arrested for not cooperating.
82	27	"Change of Heart"	Keith Boak	Julie Weston	9 April 2002	5.92
Meyer tells Ric off for getting arrested for marijuana. Steve finds a lump on a little boy's neck. Janice has a positive scan. Ric goes for an administrative job at a private clinic, then changes his mind. Alistair wants to settle the divorce.
83	28	"We Band of Brothers"	Keith Boak	Neil McKay	16 April 2002	6.06
Liam goes next door because of a loud stereo disturbing his sleep and gets drawn in to a family abuse situation. The father has beaten the mother, and is trying to suffocate his son. Liam and the man get in a scuffle and they both go over the balcony.
84	29	"Letting Go"	Simon Massey	Susan Martin	23 April 2002	6.38
Liam wakes up from his coma. Simon disputes Kath's divorce papers. A woman who cannot have children kidnaps a baby from its sleeping mother. Keri forgives Liam for raping her.
85	30	"Second Chances"	Simon Massey	Nick Warburton and Susan Martin	30 April 2002	7.52
Sam catches Alex leaving the flat after he slept with Jess. Liam is paralysed. Owen's daughter is discharged. Alex tells Jess that he does not want a relationship and breaks her heart.
86	31	"Hearts and Minds"	Russell England	James Stevenson	7 May 2002	7.70
Meyer and Alex take sides about whether to give a Down Syndrome man a heart transplant. Kath feels her relationship with Fr Chambers is moving too fast. Ric's son Leo joins the team.
87	32	"Lives Worth Living"	Russell England	Martin Jameson	14 May 2002	6.85
Liam is discharged and cannot cope with people feeling sorry for him. Jess is pregnant with Alex's baby, and Sam tries to influence her to abort the baby.
88	33	"Touch & Go"	Indra Bhose	Andrew Holden	21 May 2002	8.61
Kath wants to break off with Michael, but he has sent a letter of resignation. Liam is acting fine and happy, but when no one is home he is suicidal. Michael tries to kill himself. Kath tells him that she never wants to see him again.
89	34	"Coming Home"	Indra Bhose	Marc Pierson	28 May 2002	8.18
While Ric is planning his birthday, his daughter Jess is still undecided about an abortion that has been scheduled.
90	35	"Sweet Love Remembered"	Jane Powell	Dawn Harrison	4 June 2002	8.22
After taking Owen back after his affair with Chrissie, Laura struggles to make her family whole again. Liam is considering whether he could go back to Holby and do his job properly in a wheelchair.
91	36	"Calculated Risks"	Jane Powell	Nick Warburton	11 June 2002	7.61
There is a charity auction with the men of Holby. A few of them are nervous about who will bid on them. Pam McGrath starts work as the new Risk manager, and has already turned a few heads on day one.
92	37	"Taking Cover"	Simon Massey	Andrew Holden	18 June 2002	7.28
Tash's old girlfriend Mel comes back, only to give her disturbing news. Mubbs makes a grave error and a baby may not survive because of it.
93	38	"Love and Devotion"	Simon Massey	Neil McKay	25 June 2002	7.32
Keri gets her date with Mubbs that she won in the auction. Keri's mother Pam interrupts it and Mubbs feels awkward because earlier that day he was intimate with Pam.
94	39	"High Risk"	John Alexander	Maria Jones	2 July 2002	7.58
Owen is getting involved with Chrissie again. The new registrar, Diane Lloyd, is one of Ric's old girlfriends. Sam gives Ric a cheque to clear his debts, and on his stag night, he goes to the casino to wager the whole thing.
95	40	"The Winner Takes it All"	John Alexander	Suzie Smith	9 July 2002	7.62
Sam and Ric's wedding day arrives. Alex wants to go to Sam and tell her of his true feelings, and what Ric did with her money. Sam is having big doubts about the wedding because she still has feelings for Alex.
96	41	"From This Moment On"	Rob Evans	Gaby Chiappe	16 July 2002	7.01
Alistair is back at Holby to ask a very pregnant Janice for a divorce. Keri walks in on Mubbs and her mother Pam while they are supposed to be having a meeting and is shocked by what she sees.
97	42	"Design for Living"	Rob Evans	Marc Pierson	23 July 2002	7.49
Now that Owen's daughter Katie knows about Chrissie, he is on edge. Danny invites Lisa to live with him and Sandy. Sandy is angered that he did not consult her.
98	43	"Judas Kiss: Part 1"	James Strong	Stuart Morris	1 August 2002	6.26
Janice's pregnancy goes awry and she undergoes an emergency C-section; both mother and baby are left fighting for their lives as a result. Sam goes behind Mr Meyer's back to convince the familty of an ill boy not to go ahead with his planned operation, with disastrous results. Owen is forced to leave Katie with Chrissie while he operates on Janice; a disgruntled Chrissie fails to supervise Katie, and the latter suffers burns when she accidentally pours scalding milk on her arm. Note: Joanna Roth guest stars
99	44	"Judas Kiss: Part 2"	James Strong	Stuart Morris	6 August 2002	7.05
Meyer's team operate on the young heart patient, but the delay proves fatal. Alex admits to Meyer that Sam talked the parents out of his having the operation initially; Meyer fires Sam and blackballs her from the medical profession. After trying to convince Alex to resign with her and being turned down, she then tries to rekindle her relationship with Ric, who sees through her motives for reconciliation and turns her down, also. Alistair defies Meyer's instructions and operates on his own daughter; however, Meyer proves forgiving, and even assists on the operation. As a result, the baby survives, and Owen does enough in theatre to save Janice. Sam confronts Jan Goddard about Meyer and makes it clear she will not go quietly.
100	45	"New Hearts, Old Scores"	Keith Boak	Martin Jameson	13 August 2002	7.30
Sam has launched a complaint against Meyer and he is under investigation. Some of the other doctors believe the allegations by Sam to be true. Is Chrissie responsible for Owen's daughter's burns? First appearances of Tom Campbell-Gore and Ed Keating. Jan Goddard makes another cross-over appearance from Casualty.
101	46	"Pawns in the Game"	Keith Boak	Julia Weston	20 August 2002	7.19
Meyer breaks his operating ban to save a child. He is exonerated, but resigns. He is leaving for the USA and Alex is going with him. Chrissie has a house-warming party without Owen's knowledge. Mubbs and Lisa get back together. Final appearance of Anton Meyer
102	47	"A Second Chance"	Bill Britten	Dawn Harrison	21 August 2002	5.52
The new consultant is Tom Campbell-Gore, the very doctor who investigated Meyer. Ric and he have words over a patient.
103	48	"The Private Sector"	Bill Britten	Andrew Holden	3 September 2002	7.26
Chrissie and Owen's relationship becomes strained, and Owen looks to his work as a distraction. Ric performs radical surgery on a teenage boy, with bad results.
104	49	"Ghosts"	Simon Massey	Neil McKay	10 September 2002	6.74
Ed Keating's ex-wife shows up to a football match with her new boyfriend and they have words. Ed punches him and he has a heart attack. Lisa's dad, Terry, has a tumour and he keeps it from her.
105	50	"Pills and Frills"	Simon Massey	Joe Fraser	17 September 2002	7.83
Robbie Waring's friends steal drugs from the ward. Steve chases them and one of them gets hurt. Terry Fox's surgery is successful.
106	51	"Last Chances"	Julie Anne Robinson	Peter Bowden	24 September 2002	8.03
Terry decides to get a divorce after his surgery. Diane keeps her distance from Danny after he had his friends to her apartment for a party without her knowledge.
107	52	"Torn"	Julie Anne Robinson	Nick Warburton	1 October 2002	8.31
Terry convinces Kath to divorce Simon. Simon shows up on the ward and attempts to beat her up. Katie's 10th birthday party is a disaster.
