= Ric Griffin =

Fictional consultant general surgeon on BBC TV medical drama Holby City

- Holby City character
- Hugh Quarshie as Ric Griffin
- First appearance: "Rogue Males"; 9 October 2001
- Last appearance: "Episode 1102"; 29 March 2022
- Created by: Mal Young
- Portrayed by: Hugh Quarshie
- Crossover(s): Casualty (2004, 2005, 2017, 2019)

In-universe information
- Occupation: Consultant general surgeon; Clinical Board Director; Medical Director
- Family: Kumi Griffin (brother)
- Spouse: Thandie Abebe-Griffin; Lola Griffin; Amber Griffin
- Significant other: Diane Lloyd; Sam Kennedy; Annalese Carson
- Children: Leo Griffin; Jess Griffin; Kofi Johnstone; Cleo Sullivan (stepdaughter)
- Relatives: Paris Khan (grandson); Jacob Kilburn (grandson); Darla Johnstone (granddaughter); Erica Johnstone (great-granddaughter)
- Nationality: Ghanaian

Kobina Eric "Ric" Griffin is a fictional character from the BBC medical drama Holby City, portrayed by actor Hugh Quarshie. The character is introduced as a consultant in general surgery during the series four episode "Rogue Males", originally broadcast on 9 October 2001. Having appeared in more than 500 episodes, Ric is the show's longest-serving character. Quarshie announced his departure from the drama in 2020, and Ric departs in a series 22 episode, originally broadcast on 10 November 2020. Quarshie returned for the show's final episode, which was broadcast on 29 March 2022.

== Development ==
Discussing the storyline that saw Ric's oldest son Leo die from a heroin overdose, Quarshie said: "I don't think his death is a shock to Ric as he almost expected it. It's devastating for him, but in true Ric style he holds everything in and throws himself into work. The consequences of the tragedy are felt later down the line." He drew on Ric's troubled relationship with his own father to explain his distant relationship with his children, assessing: "Ric had a domineering and violent father. He swore he'd never be that controlling with his own kids and as a result he was too hands-off."

In July 2010, Quarshie revealed that Ric would be diagnosed with inoperable cancer, explaining: It's asymptomatic – you don't know you've got it until it's spread... It's so far gone, what's the point in having chemotherapy?" He stated that following the diagnosis, Ric would become close to Annalese Carson, the estranged wife of his colleague Michael Spence.

As a long-standing cast member, Quarshie has been granted leave to pursue other projects including directing an episode of Holby City. Series producer Simon Harper has stated that the actor is allowed to ensure the character remains in the show for a longer tenure. The character remained off-screen for several months during 2015.

Quarshie appears as Ric in a two-part crossover episode with Holby City's sister show Casualty originally broadcast in March 2019.

In October 2020, it was announced that Quarshie had decided to leave the show, having appeared in more than 500 episodes. In a statement, the actor credited Holby City with changing his career and revealed that he nearly quit acting prior to joining the show. He commented: "I wouldn't have stayed so long if it hadn't been a great place to work, and leaving will be like leaving home - a place where there is warmth and a welcome, a place to which you can always return..." Ric departs in a specially commissioned episode focusing on the COVID-19 pandemic, originally broadcast on 10 November 2020 as part of the twenty-second series.

Holby City was cancelled in June 2021 after 23 years on air. Producers invited multiple former cast members to reprise their roles during the show's final series. On 16 March 2022, it was announced that Quarshie had reprised his role as Ric for the show's final episode, which first airs on 29 March 2022.

== Storylines ==
Ric arrived at Holby City Hospital in episode "Rogue Males" as a General Surgical Consultant. It was revealed in the show's seventh series that he originated from Ghana, where his brother Kumi runs a hospital. He has been married five times - twice to Critical Care Consultant Lola Griffin - and has had several romances during his time on the show, including engagement to Senior House Officer Sam Kennedy, long term flirtation with former flame Diane Lloyd, and a brief marriage to Registrar Thandie Griffin. Diane and Ric got even more close in Ghana, while Keller ward was downsized and Diane hoped Ric would come back to Holby. He refused but eventually moved back. He had to put Diane under supervision while she was a consultant because a healthcare commission worker told him so. Diane committed suicide because she felt nobody supported her and when Thandie found out that Ric loved Diane, she broke up with him. Ric went to have a time alone with Diane in the mortuary and he had a breakdown.

Two of Ric's six children have appeared in the show; oldest son Leo Griffin, who Ric initially hoped would follow him into medicine, but died in series ten from a heroin overdose, and daughter Jess Griffin, who worked alongside him at Holby City Hospital as an AAU nurse. Through Jess and Leo, Ric had three grandsons. Two died as infants, but Jess's second son Jacob survived, and is still with Jess.

In the show's tenth series, Ric applied for the position of Director of Surgery, making an underhand deal to turn the position over to Connie Beauchamp in return for her support with his application. As each of the other candidates dropped out or were rejected, Ric was moments away from being offered the position, when he was called away to identify his son's body.

Later in mid series 11, Connie reminded Ric, that the director of surgery job was up and he had to pass it over to her like they had agreed. But Ric didn't and made out that he had resigned and had to give three months' notice. Connie found out that he was lying. In the end Connie and Ric constantly battled each other, but Ric still holds down the position of the job.

Ric had recently introduced breathalyser tests as part of his zero tolerance policy. Annalese Carson failed hers. Ric promised to cover it up as long as Paul Rose supervised her in theatre. But Connie found out and reported it to Jayne.

A full investigation was held into the death of Steve Hewitt. He was a friend and patient of Connie's who died during an operation Michael Spence was performing. Ric had previously refused to operate on him as he was a zero tolerance patient, but his condition deteriorated. Michael Spence operated on Steve Hewitt. Annalese was the anaesthetist in the operation and she had not given proper drugs when he arrested and died on the table. His wife wanted an investigation, and Kathy Hewitt blamed Ric. An investigation was held and Connie discovered the hidden information Michael had tried to hide.

In episode thirty-five of series eleven, Ric Griffin was informed by Jayne Grayson that she had lost confidence in his leadership as director of surgery and was planning to ask the board to re-advertise the position. At the end of the episode, Jayne is seen handing a piece of paper with details of the director of surgery job to Connie.

During season 17 episode 32, "The Ides of March" (May 2015), Ric took an extended break from Holby to visit his daughter Jess in Australia. He returned in the episode "Beginnings" (season 18, episode 12), aired on 29 December 2015; however, he was out of place upon his return owing to his extended absence.

== Reception ==
Quarshie has been nominated for several awards for his portrayal of Ric, and won "Favourite Male TV Star" at the 2008 Screen Nation Awards. He was nominated for the "Male Performance in TV" award at the 2006 Screen Nation Awards, and received a Mention in the same category in 2007. Quarshie was named 23rd "Best Actor" in the 2004 BBC Drama Awards, and came 22nd the following year. He was long-listed for the "Most Popular Actor" award at the 2004 and 2005 National Television Awards, and was also long-listed for the "Best Actor" award at the 2004 TV Quick Awards.
