= List of awards and nominations received by Holby City =

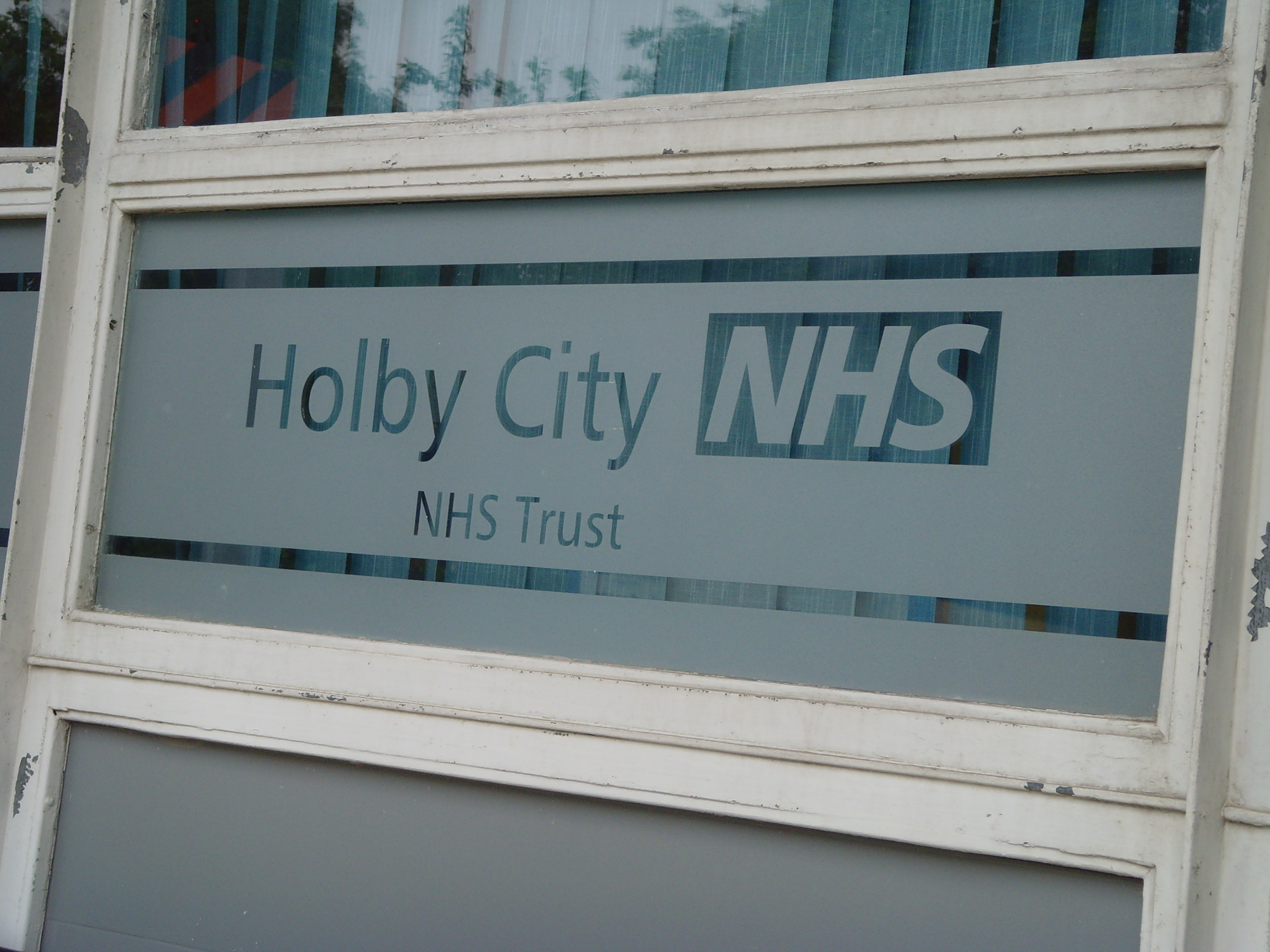
- The show's hospital set at BBC Elstree Centre in Borehamwood
Awards and nominations
Award	Won	Nominated
BBC Drama Awards	0	32
British Academy Television Awards	1	9
Broadcast Awards	0	11
Digital Spy Soap Awards	0	16
Ethnic Multicultural Media Awards	2	4
Inside Soap Awards	5	54
Music Video and Screen Awards	3	3
National Television Awards	0	32
Royal Television Society Awards	0	4
Screen Nation Film and Television Awards	5	26
TV Choice Awards	0	34
Writers' Guild of Great Britain Awards	2	6
Other awards	2	9
- Total number of wins and nominations
Totals	18	225
- References

Holby City is a British medical drama television series that was broadcast on BBC One in the United Kingdom between 12 January 1999 and 29 March 2022. The series was created by Tony McHale and Mal Young as a spin-off from the BBC medical drama Casualty, which is set in the emergency department of the fictional Holby City Hospital, based in the equally fictitious town of Holby. Young wanted to explore what happened to patients treated in Casualty once they were taken away to the hospital's surgical wards. He opined that Casualty limited itself to "accident of the week" storylines, while Holby City allowed the possibility of storylines about long-term care, rather than immediate life-and-death decisions.

Holby City has earned various awards and nominations, with the nominations in categories ranging from Best Drama to its writing and editing work to the cast's acting performance. It received nominations for eight awards from the British Academy of Film and Television Arts (BAFTAs), winning the Best Continuing Drama in the 2008 British Academy Television Awards — an award for which it was unsuccessfully nominated in for three years prior to winning and five years after winning. Despite being the most shortlisted Holby City actress, Amanda Mealing (who portrayed Connie Beauchamp) did not win any awards for her role. Rosie Marcel was the most acclaimed actor from the series, winning four awards for her role as Jac Naylor. Rebecca Wojciechowski and Peter Mattessi are the only members of the show's production team to win an accolade; they have each won a Writers' Guild of Great Britain award. The serial has also been nominated for 32 awards at the National Television Awards, although it never won.

== Awards and nominations ==
=== BBC Drama Awards ===
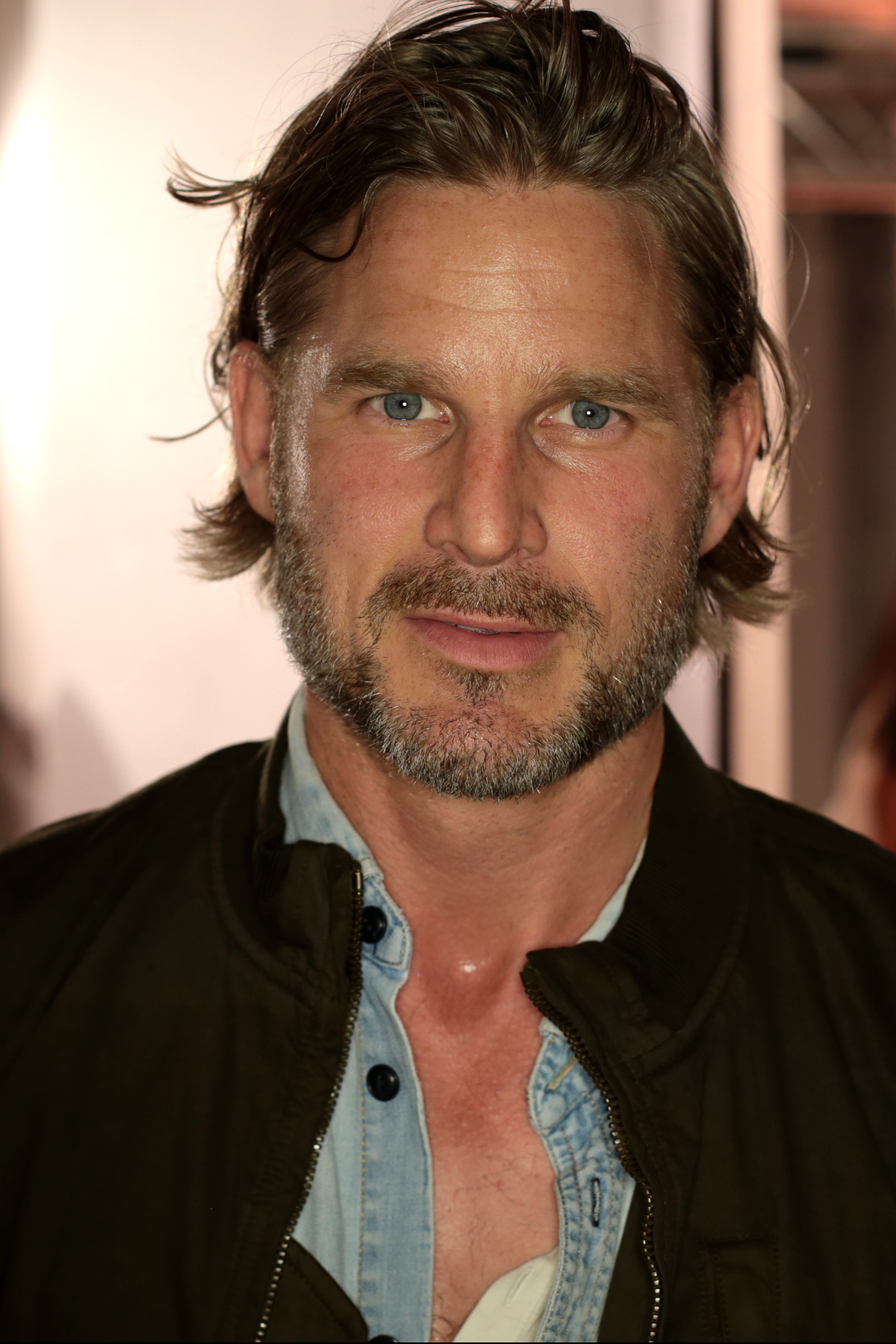
Noah Huntley (pictured), who portrayed Will Curtis, came nineteenth in the "Best Actor" category and eighteenth in the "Most Desirable Drama Star" in 2004.

The BBC Drama Awards were an online award ceremony organised by BBC Online and voted by BBC Online users to celebrate a year in BBC television and media. Holby City has received 36 nominations from the awards.

Year	Category	Nominee	Result
2002	Best Drama	Holby City	19th
2002	Hunkiest Male	Jeremy Sheffield as Alex Adams	13th
2003	Best Drama	Holby City	13th
2003	Best Actor	Art Malik as Zubin Khan	24th
2003	Best Actor	Jeremy Sheffield as Alex Adams	22nd
2003	Best Actress	Laura Sadler as Sandy Harper	27th
2003	Best Actress	Rachel Leskovac as Kelly Yorke	25th
2003	Best Actress	Tina Hobley as Chrissie Williams	19th
2003	Best Actress	Patricia Potter as Diane Lloyd	18th
2003	Best Villain	Kelly Yorke (played by Rachel Leskovac)	11th
2004	Best Drama	Holby City	5th
2004	Best Actor	Hugh Quarshie as Ric Griffin	23rd
2004	Best Actor	Noah Huntley as Will Curtis	19th
2004	Best Actor	Art Malik as Zubin Khan	13th
2004	Best Actress	Patricia Potter as Diane Lloyd	19th
2004	Best Actress	Verona Joseph as Jess Griffin	11th
2004	Best Actress	Amanda Mealing as Connie Beauchamp	7th
2004	Most Desirable Drama Star	Amanda Mealing as Connie Beauchamp	18th
2004	Most Desirable Drama Star	Noah Huntley as Will Curtis	18th
2004	Most Desirable Drama Star	Art Malik as Zubin Khan	13th
2005	Best Drama	Holby City	6th
2005	Best Actor	Art Malik as Zubin Khan	26th
2005	Best Actor	Hugh Quarshie as Ric Griffin	22nd
2005	Best Actress	Verona Joseph as Jess Griffin	29th
2005	Best Actress	Patricia Potter as Diane Lloyd	29th
2005	Best Actress	Amanda Mealing as Connie Beauchamp	6th
2006	Best Drama	Holby City	5th
2006	Best Actor	Paul Bradley as Elliot Hope	20th
2006	Best Actor	Luke Roberts as Joseph Byrne	19th
2006	Best Actor	Tom Chambers as Sam Strachan	11th
2006	Best Actress	Patricia Potter as Diane Lloyd	15th
2006	Best Actress	Amanda Mealing as Connie Beauchamp	4th

=== British Academy Television Awards ===
Established in 1955, the British Academy Television Awards (BAFTAs) were created by the charity British Academy of Film and Television Arts to recognise accomplishments in television. Holby City has received one award from eight nominations.

Year	Category	Nominee	Result
2004	Best Continuing Drama	Mal Young, Kathleen Hutchison	Nominated
2005	Best Continuing Drama	Production team	Nominated
2006	Best Continuing Drama	Production team	Nominated
2008	Best Continuing Drama	Production team	Won
2012	Best Soap and Continuing Drama	Production team	Nominated
2014	Best Soap and Continuing Drama	Production team	Nominated
2016	Best Soap and Continuing Drama	Oliver Kent, Simon Harper, Kate Hall, Joe Ainsworth	Nominated
2020	Best Soap and Continuing Drama	Production team	Nominated
2022	Best Soap and Continuing Drama	Production team	Nominated

=== Broadcast Awards ===
The Broadcast Awards, which were created by Broadcast magazine, honour accomplishments in the UK television programming industry. Holby City has received 11 nominations.

Year	Category	Nominee	Result
2011	Best Soap/Continuing Drama	Holby City	Nominated
2012	Best Soap/Continuing Drama	Holby City	Nominated
2013	Best Soap/Continuing Drama	Holby City	Nominated
2014	Best Soap/Continuing Drama	Holby City	Nominated
2015	Best Soap/Continuing Drama	Holby City	Nominated
2016	Best Soap/Continuing Drama	Holby City	Nominated
2017	Best Soap/Continuing Drama	Holby City	Nominated
2018	Best Soap/Continuing Drama	Holby City	Nominated
2019	Best Soap/Continuing Drama	Holby City	Nominated
2020	Best Soap/Continuing Drama	Holby City	Nominated
2022	Best Soap/Continuing Drama	Holby City	Nominated

=== Digital Spy Soap Awards ===
The Digital Spy Soap Awards, which were created by entertainment website Digital Spy, annually celebrates moments in British and Australian soap operas. Originally conceived as an award ceremony in 2008, the awards later became an online voting system across the website as part of the Digital Spy Reader Awards. Holby City has received 16 nominations.

Year	Category	Nominee	Result
2008	Best Serial Drama	Holby City	Nominated
2018	Best Soap (Evening)	Holby City	5th
2018	Best Soap Actor (Female)	Rosie Marcel as Jac Naylor	7th
2018	Best Soap Actor (Male)	Guy Henry as Henrik Hanssen	11th
2018	Best Soap Storyline	John Gaskell's reign of terror	11th
2018	Best Soap Couple	Dominic Copeland and Lofty Chiltern	11th
2018	Biggest OMG Soap moment	John Gaskell kills Roxanna MacMillan	8th
2018	Most devastating Soap Death	Roxanna MacMillan	10th
2018	Best Soap Newcomer	Marcus Griffiths as Xavier Duval	9th
2019	Best Evening Soap	Holby City	5th
2019	Best Soap Newcomer	Amy Lennox as Chloe Godard	Nominated
2019	Best Soap Actor (Female)	Rosie Marcel as Jac Naylor	Nominated
2019	Best Soap Actor (Male)	David Ames as Dominic Copeland	Nominated
2019	Best Soap Storyline	Jac Naylor's breakdown	Nominated
2019	Best Soap Couple	Dominic Copeland and Lofty Chiltern	Nominated
2019	OMG Soap moment	Ange Godard is Dominic Copeland's mother	Nominated

=== Ethnic Multicultural Media Awards ===
The Ethnic Multicultural Media Awards (EMMAs) were created to promote diversity within the media industry by recognising accomplishments in the multicultural community. Holby City has received two awards from four nominations.

Year	Category	Nominee	Result
2000	Best Actress	Angela Griffin as Jasmine Hopkins	Won
2002	Best TV Actress	Angela Griffin as Jasmine Hopkins	Nominated
2002	Best TV Actress	Thusitha Jayasundera as Tash Bandara	Nominated
2004	Best TV Actor	Art Malik as Zubin Khan	Won

=== Inside Soap Awards ===
The Inside Soap Awards are presented annually by Inside Soap magazine and acknowledge achievements in British and Australian soap operas. Holby City has received five awards from 47 nominations.

Year	Category	Nominee	Result
2003	Best Drama	Holby City	Nominated
2004	Best Drama	Holby City	Nominated
2006	Best Drama	Holby City	Nominated
2007	Best Drama	Holby City	Nominated
2008	Best Drama	Holby City	Nominated
2009	Best Drama	Holby City	Nominated
2010	Best Drama	Holby City	Nominated
2011	Best Drama	Holby City	Nominated
2012	Best Drama	Holby City	Nominated
2013	Best Drama	Holby City	Nominated
2014	Best Drama	Holby City	Nominated
2015	Best Drama	Holby City	Nominated
2016	Best Drama Star	David Ames as Dominic Copeland	Shortlisted
2016	Best Drama Star	Rob Ostlere as Arthur Digby	Shortlisted
2016	Best Drama Star	Camilla Arfwedson as Zosia March	Longlisted
2016	Best Drama Star	Rosie Marcel as Jac Naylor	Longlisted
2016	Best Drama Storyline	Arthur's death	Won
2016	Best Drama Storyline	Fletch saves the day!	Shortlisted
2016	Best Drama Storyline	Zosia and Ollie's romance	Longlisted
2017	Best Drama Star	Chizzy Akudolu as Mo Effanga	Longlisted
2017	Best Drama Star	David Ames as Dominic Copeland	Shortlisted
2017	Best Drama Star	Camilla Arfwedson as Zosia March	Longlisted
2017	Best Drama Star	Rosie Marcel as Jac Naylor	Longlisted
2017	Best Drama Storyline	Dom's abuse	Shortlisted
2017	Best Drama Storyline	Jasmine's death	Longlisted
2017	Best Drama Storyline	Mo and Mr T's relationship	Longlisted
2018	Best Drama Star	Guy Henry as Henrik Hanssen	Longlisted
2018	Best Drama Star	Rosie Marcel as Jac Naylor	Shortlisted
2018	Best Drama Star	Paul McGann as John Gaskell	Longlisted
2018	Best Drama Star	Catherine Russell as Serena Campbell	Longlisted
2018	Best Drama Storyline	"Berena" overcome the odds	Longlisted
2018	Best Drama Storyline	John Gaskell's journey to the dark side	Shortlisted
2018	Best Drama Storyline	The hospital shooting	Won
2019	Best Drama Star	David Ames as Dominic Copeland	Shortlisted
2019	Best Drama Star	Bob Barrett as Sacha Levy	Longlisted
2019	Best Drama Star	Rosie Marcel as Jac Naylor	Won
2019	Best Drama Star	Dawn Steele as Ange Godard	Longlisted
2019	Best Drama Storyline	Dom finds out that Ange is his birth mother	Shortlisted
2019	Best Drama Storyline	Sacha's depression	Longlisted
2019	Best Drama Storyline	The Holby cyper-attack	Shortlisted
2020	Best Drama Star	Nic Jackman as Cameron Dunn	Longlisted
2020	Best Drama Star	Rosie Marcel as Jac Naylor	Shortlisted
2020	Best Drama Star	Alex Walkinshaw as Adrian "Fletch" Fletcher	Shortlisted
2020	Best Drama Star	Kaye Wragg as Essie Di Lucca	Longlisted
2021	Best Drama Star	Guy Henry as Henrik Hanssen	Nominated
2021	Best Drama Star	Nic Jackman as Cameron Dunn	Nominated
2021	Best Drama Star	Rosie Marcel as Jac Naylor	Won
2021	Best Drama Star	Jo Martin as Max McGerry	Nominated
2022	Best Drama Star	Guy Henry as Henrik Hanssen	Nominated
2022	Best Drama Star	Rosie Marcel as Jac Naylor	Won
2022	Best Drama Star	Jo Martin as Max McGerry	Nominated
2022	Best Drama Star	Alex Walkinshaw as Adrian "Fletch" Fletcher	Nominated

=== Music Video and Screen Awards ===
Recognising the talent and achievement of ethnic minorities, the Music Video and Screen Awards have been presented annually at the Birmingham Black International Film Festival since 2007. Holby City has won three awards from three nominations.

Year	Category	Nominee	Result
2011	Best Actor in TV	Jimmy Akingbola as Antoine Malick	Won
2011	Best Drama	Holby City	Won
2016	Best Long Running Drama	Holby City	Won

=== National Television Awards ===
Introduced in 1995, the National Television Awards are designed to award achievements within British television. Holby City has received 32 nominations.

Year	Category	Nominee	Result
2003	Most Popular Newcomer	Rocky Marshall as Ed Keating	Longlisted
2003	Most Popular Actress	Tina Hobley as Chrissie Williams	Longlisted
2003	Most Popular Actor	Jeremy Sheffield as Alex Adams	Longlisted
2003	Most Popular Drama	Holby City	Longlisted
2005	Most Popular Newcomer	Amanda Mealing as Connie Beauchamp	Shortlisted
2006	Most Popular Newcomer	Luke Roberts as Joseph Byrne	Longlisted
2006	Most Popular Actress	Amanda Mealing as Connie Beauchamp	Longlisted
2006	Most Popular Actor	Michael French as Nick Jordan	Longlisted
2006	Most Popular Drama	Holby City	Longlisted
2010	Best Drama Performance	Hari Dhillon as Michael Spence	Longlisted
2010	Best Drama Performance	Amanda Mealing as Connie Beauchamp	Longlisted
2010	Best Drama	Holby City	Longlisted
2011	Best Drama	Holby City	Longlisted
2011	Best Drama Performance	Luke Roberts as Joseph Byrne	Longlisted
2011	Best Drama Performance	Rosie Marcel as Jac Naylor	Longlisted
2011	Best Newcomer	Olga Fedori as Frieda Petrenko	Shortlisted
2012	Best Drama	Holby City	Longlisted
2012	Best Male Drama Performance	Guy Henry as Henrik Hanssen	Longlisted
2012	Best Female Drama Performance	Laila Rouass as Sahira Shah	Longlisted
2012	Best Newcomer	Jimmy Akingbola as Antoine Malick	Longlisted
2013	Best Drama	Holby City	Longlisted
2013	Best Male Drama Performance	Guy Henry as Henrik Hanssen	Longlisted
2013	Best Female Drama Performance	Rosie Marcel as Jac Naylor	Longlisted
2013	Best Newcomer	Chizzy Akudolu as Mo Effanga	Longlisted
2014	Best Drama	Holby City	Longlisted
2014	Best Drama Performance	Guy Henry as Henrik Hanssen	Longlisted
2014	Best Drama Performance	Rosie Marcel as Jac Naylor	Longlisted
2014	Best Newcomer	Rob Ostlere as Arthur Digby	Longlisted
2015	Best Drama	Holby City	Longlisted
2015	Best Drama Performance	Paul Bradley as Elliot Hope	Longlisted
2015	Best Drama Performance	Rosie Marcel as Jac Naylor	Longlisted
2015	Best Newcomer	Camilla Arfwedson as Zosia March	Longlisted

=== Royal Television Society Awards ===
Organised by the Royal Television Society, the Royal Television Society Awards are presented annually and award based on achievements in television programming and programme production amongst others. Holby City has received four nominations.

Year	Award ceremony	Category	Nominee	Result
2000	Craft and Design Awards	Best Graphic Design – Titles	Sean De Sparengo, Richard Gort	Nominated
2007	Programme Awards	Soap and Continuing Drama	Holby City	Nominated
2008	Programme Awards	Soap and Continuing Drama	Holby City	Nominated
2018	Programme Awards	Soap and Continuing Drama	Holby City	Nominated
2021	Programme Awards	Soap and Continuing Drama	Holby City	Nominated

=== Screen Nation Film and Television Awards ===
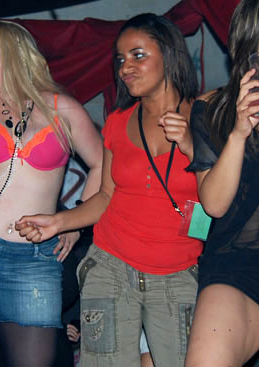
Rebecca Wester actress Larissa Wilson (pictured) was nominated in the "Young Shooting Star (16–23)" category at the 2011 award ceremony.

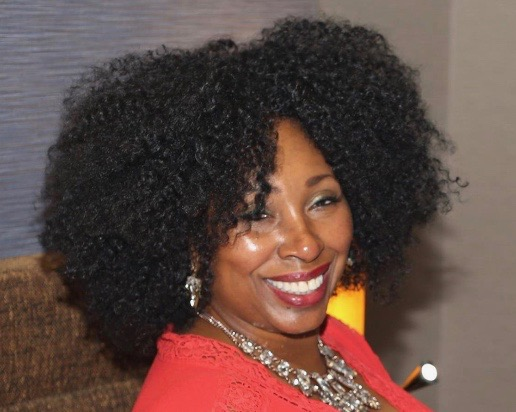
Jo Martin (pictured) won the Female Performance in TV award in 2020 for her portrayal of Max McGerry.

The Screen Nation Film and Television Awards are presented annually and were designed as a platform to raise the profile of black British and international film and television talent of African heritage. Holby City has received five awards from 26 nominations.

Year	Category	Nominee	Result
2005	Emerging Talent	Jaye Jacobs as Donna Jackson	Won
2006	Female Performance in TV	Rakie Ayola as Kyla Tyson	Nominated
2006	Male Performance in TV	Hugh Quarshie as Ric Griffin	Nominated
2007	Female Performance in TV	Sharon D. Clarke as Lola Griffin	Won
2007	Female Performance in TV	Ginny Holder as Thandie Abebe	Nominated
2007	Male Performance in TV	Roger Griffiths as Harvey Tyson	Nominated
2009	Favourite Female TV Star	Jaye Jacobs as Donna Jackson	Nominated
2009	Favourite Male TV Star	Hugh Quarshie as Ric Griffin	Won
2009	Female Performance in TV	Rakie Ayola as Kyla Tyson	Nominated
2009	Diversity in Drama Production	Holby City	Nominated
2011	Emerging Talent	La Charné Jolly as Elizabeth Tait	Won
2011	Young Shooting Star (16–23)	Larissa Wilson as Rebecca Webster	Nominated
2011	Female Performance in TV	Ginny Holder as Thandie Abebe	Nominated
2011	Male Performance in TV	Jimmy Akingbola as Antoine Malick	Nominated
2012	Diversity in Drama Production	Holby City	Nominated
2012	Emerging Talent and Young Shooting Star	Chizzy Akudolu as Mo Effanga	Nominated
2015	Diversity in Drama Production	Holby City	Nominated
2015	Female Performance in TV	Petra Letang as Adele Effanga	Nominated
2015	Male Performance in TV	Don Gilet as Jesse Law	Nominated
2016	Rising Star	Eleanor Fanyinka as Morven Shreve	Nominated
2016	Male Performance in TV	Geff Francis as Clifford George	Nominated
2019	Diversity in Drama Production	Holby City	Nominated
2019	Female Performance in TV	Sharon D. Clarke as Lola Griffin	Nominated
2019	Male Performance in TV	Marcus Griffiths as Xavier Duval	Nominated
2020	Female Performance in TV	Jo Martin as Max McGerry	Won
2020	Male Performance in TV	Marcus Griffiths as Xavier Duval	Nominated

=== TV Choice Awards ===
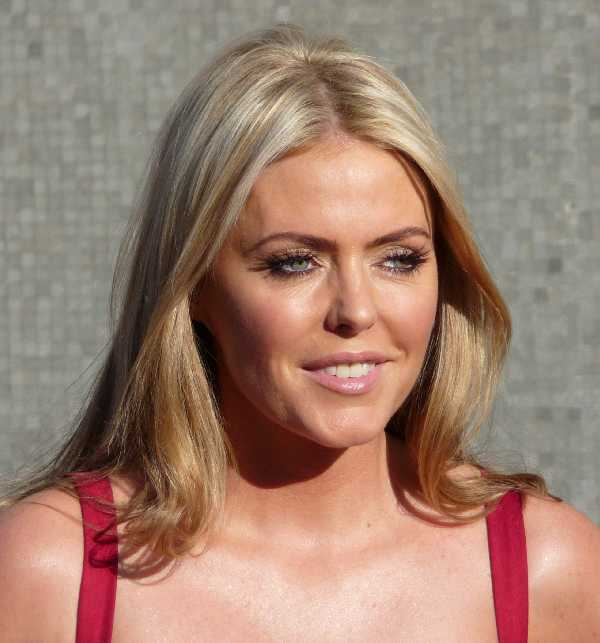
Patsy Kensit (pictured) was nominated in the "Best Actress" category at the 2007 awards for her role as Faye Morton.

The TV Choice Awards are presented annually by TV Choice magazine and are voted for by the public. Holby City has received 34 nominations.

Year	Category	Nominee	Result
2001	Best Actor	George Irving as Anton Meyer	Nominated
2001	Best Loved Drama	Holby City	Nominated
2002	Best Actor	George Irving as Anton Meyer	Nominated
2002	Best Loved Drama	Holby City	Nominated
2004	Best Actor	Hugh Quarshie as Ric Griffin	Nominated
2004	Best Loved Drama	Holby City	Nominated
2005	Best Actor	Art Malik as Zubin Khan	Nominated
2005	Best Actress	Sharon Maughan as Tricia Williams	Nominated
2005	Best Actress	Amanda Mealing as Connie Beauchamp	Nominated
2005	Best Loved Drama	Holby City	Nominated
2007	Best Actor	Paul Bradley as Elliot Hope	Nominated
2007	Best Actor	Luke Roberts as Joseph Byrne	Nominated
2007	Best Actress	Patsy Kensit as Faye Morton	Nominated
2007	Best Actress	Amanda Mealing as Connie Beauchamp	Nominated
2007	Best Loved Drama Series	Holby City	Nominated
2011	Best Actress	Rosie Marcel as Jac Naylor	Longlisted
2011	Best Actor	Duncan Pow as Linden Cullen	Longlisted
2011	Best Family Drama	Holby City	Longlisted
2012	Best Actor	Guy Henry as Henrik Hanssen	Longlisted
2012	Best Family Drama	Holby City	Longlisted
2013	Best Actress	Rosie Marcel as Jac Naylor	Longlisted
2013	Best Family Drama	Holby City	Longlisted
2015	Best Actress	Catherine Russell as Serena Campbell	Longlisted
2015	Best Actor	Alex Walkinshaw as Adrian "Fletch" Fletcher	Longlisted
2015	Best Family Drama	Holby City	Shortlisted
2017	Best Actress	Camilla Arfwedson as Zosia March	Longlisted
2017	Best Actor	David Ames as Dominic Copeland	Longlisted
2017	Best Family Drama	Holby City	Longlisted
2018	Best Actress	Rosie Marcel as Jac Naylor	Longlisted
2018	Best Actor	Guy Henry as Henrik Hanssen	Longlisted
2018	Best Family Drama	Holby City	Longlisted
2019	Best Actress	Dawn Steele as Ange Godard	Longlisted
2019	Best Actor	Bob Barrett as Sacha Levy	Longlisted
2019	Best Family Drama	Holby City	Longlisted
2021	Best Actress	Rosie Marcel as Jac Naylor	Longlisted
2021	Best Actor	John Michie as Guy Self	Longlisted
2021	Best Family Drama	Holby City	Longlisted

=== Writers' Guild of Great Britain Awards ===
Recognising accomplishments in television writing, the Writers' Guild of Great Britain Awards have been presented annually by the Writers' Guild of Great Britain since 1961. Holby City has won two award from seven nominations.

Year	Category	Nominee	Result
2010	Best Television Continuing Drama	Tony McHale, Justin Young, Mark Catley, Graham Mitchell, Dana Fainaru, Martha Hillier, Chris Murray, David Lawrence, Veronica Henry, Peter Lloyd, Joe Ainsworth, Abi Bown, Andrew Holden, Ian Kershaw, Sebastian Baczkiewicz, Rob Williams, Al Smith, Claire Bennett, Jake Riddell, Nick Warburton, Sonali Bhattacharyya, Rebecca Wojciechowski, Tom Bidwell, Dan Sefton, Paul Mari, Nick Fisher and Sally Abbott.	Shortlisted
2013	Best Television Continuing Drama	Holby City	Shortlisted
2015	Best Long Running TV Series	"Self Control" – Rebecca Wojciechowski	Won
2016	Best Long Running TV Series	"At First I was Afraid" – Julia Gilbert	Nominated
2018	Best Long Running TV Series	"Rocket Man" – Peter Mattessi	Won
2020	Best Long Running TV Series	"Mad as Hell" – Martin Jameson	Nominated
2022	Best Long Running TV Series	"Kintsugi" – Martin Jameson	Nominated

=== Other ===
Year	Award ceremony	Category	Nominee	Result
2003	British Academy Television Craft Awards	Best New Director – Fiction	Minkie Spiro	Nominated
2009	British Academy Scotland Awards	Acting Performance in TV (Female)	Stella Gonet as Jayne Grayson	Nominated
2011	Mind Media Awards	Drama	Holby City	Nominated
2011	BEFFTA Awards	Best TV Actor	Jimmy Akingbola as Antoine Malick	Won
2012	Radio Times Creative Diversity Network Soap Award	Best Soap Storyline	"From Here To Maternity"	Nominated
2014	Creative Diversity Awards	Achievement in Production	Holby City	Nominated
2015	Mind Media Awards	Soaps and Continuing Series	Zosia's bipolar storyline	Nominated
2017	Autism Uncut Media Awards	Drama	Holby City	Shortlisted
2022	TRIC Awards	Soap	Holby City	Nominated
2022	TRIC Awards	Soap Actor	Rosie Marcel as Jac Naylor	Won
