= Holby City =

British medical drama television series (1999–2022)

- Title card (2021–2022)
- Genre: Medical drama
- Created by: Tony McHale; Mal Young
- Starring: Regular and recurring cast
- Country of origin: United Kingdom
- Original language: English
- No. of series: 23
- No. of episodes: 1,102 (list of episodes)

Production
- Executive producers: Mal Young (1999–2004); Johnathan Young (1999, 2011–2013); Kathleen Hutchison (2002–2004); Richard Stokes (2004–2006); Tony McHale (2006–2010); Belinda Campbell (2010–2011); Oliver Kent (2013–2017); Simon Harper (2017–2021)
- Camera setup: Single-camera setup
- Running time: 50 minutes (1999); 60 minutes (1999–2020); 38–45 minutes (2020–2022)
- Production company: BBC Studios Continuing Drama Productions

Original release
- Network: BBC One
- Release: 12 January 1999 – 29 March 2022

Related
- Casualty; HolbyBlue

Holby City (stylised as HOLBY CI^{+}Y) is a British medical drama television series that aired weekly on BBC One. Created by Tony McHale and Mal Young as a spin-off from the established BBC medical drama Casualty, it ran from 12 January 1999 to 29 March 2022. The series follows the lives of medical and ancillary staff at the fictional Holby City Hospital, the same hospital as Casualty, in the fictional city of Holby, and features occasional crossovers of characters and plots with both Casualty (which include dedicated episodes broadcast as Casualty@Holby City) and the show's 2007 police procedural spin-off HolbyBlue. It began with eleven main characters in its first series, all of whom subsequently departed. New main characters were then periodically written in and out, with a core of around fifteen main actors employed at any given time. In casting the first series, Young sought actors already well known in the television industry, something which has continued throughout its history, with cast members including Patsy Kensit, Jane Asher, Robert Powell, Ade Edmondson, and John Michie.

McHale was lead writer for several years, and was the first British writer ever to become the showrunner of a major prime-time drama. Under his tenure as executive producer, attempts were made at modernising the programme and appealing to a younger audience by taking on the filmizing technique and introducing musical montage segments into each episode. Twenty-three series of Holby City aired, with the final series concluding on 29 March 2022. The programme ran for more than 1000 hour-long episodes. It was filmed at the BBC Elstree Centre in Hertfordshire, and has featured special episodes filmed on location abroad. From October 2010, Holby City moved to high definition broadcasting. Its first executive producers were Mal and Johnathan Young, who were succeeded by Kathleen Hutchison from 2002 to 2004, Richard Stokes from 2004 to 2006, McHale from 2006 to 2010, Belinda Campbell from 2010 to 2011, Johnathan Young from 2011 to 2013, Oliver Kent from 2013 to 2017 and Simon Harper from 2017 to 2021. Holby City aired once a week, year round, and each series contained 52 episodes.

Holby City has attracted comparisons to other medical dramas, often unfavourable, and figures within the entertainment industry, including Broadcasting Standards Commission director Paul Bolt, have accused the BBC of squandering the television licence fee on the programme. The series employs a team of researchers to ensure medical accuracy, and utilises surgeons from different disciplines to check scripts. Cast members are taught basic medical procedures, and given the opportunity to spend time on real hospital wards for research. Holby City has, however, been criticised for its lack of realism, with the British Medical Association denouncing its portrayal of organ donation and unrealistic impression of resuscitation, and an accident and emergency nurse at the 2008 Royal College of Nursing conference accusing the show of fostering unrealistic expectations of the NHS and fuelling compensation culture.

Holby City has been nominated for more than 100 television awards, of which it has won ten: the 2008 British Academy Television Award for Best Continuing Drama, one BEFFTA Award, two Ethnic Multicultural Media Awards, two Music Video and Screen Awards, and four Screen Nation Awards. The show's first series averaged 9.27 million viewers, but apart from a rise in its fifth series, ratings declined year-on-year until 2009, with the eleventh series averaging 5.44 million viewers. The twelfth series saw a small rise to 5.62 million. Later series consistently drew more than 4 million viewers per week.

== Production ==
The show began with only eleven main characters in its first series. New main characters were both written in and out of the series prior to its end, with a core of fifteen to twenty main actors employed on the serial at any given time. In casting the first series, Young sought out actors who were already well known in the television industry, something which has continued throughout the show's history, with cast members including Patsy Kensit, Jane Asher, Robert Powell, Adrian Edmondson, Alex Walkinshaw, Tina Hobley and Jemma Redgrave.

McHale was the show's lead writer for several years, and was the first British writer ever to become the "showrunner" of a major prime time drama. Under his tenure as executive producer, attempts were made at modernising the programme and appealing to a younger audience by taking on the filmising technique and introducing musical montage segments into each episode. Twenty complete series of Holby City have aired, and a twenty-first began airing in January 2019. The show has run for more than 600 hour-long episodes. It is filmed in studios at the BBC Elstree Centre in Hertfordshire, with the 1960s office building Neptune House being used for multiple exteriors and interiors in the series. It has occasionally featured special episodes filmed on location abroad. From October 2010, Holby City moved to high definition broadcasting.

In September 2016, as part of the broadcaster's Compete Or Compare Strategy, the BBC confirmed the show would be one of the first put up for tender. In the tender released in October, it was confirmed the contract, open to independent producers and BBC Studios, would be for 3 series of a minimum 50 episodes per series, delivered from December 2017 with no break in transmission and produced from the existing production base at BBC Elstree Centre. BBC Studios was announced as the winning bidder and was to continue to produce the show through to 2020.

It was announced on 18 March 2020 that production had been suspended on Holby City and other BBC Studios continuing dramas in light of new government guidelines following the COVID-19 pandemic. A BBC Studios statement said there would be no impact on the immediate broadcast of episodes, but that the "long-term ramifications are still unclear". Despite this, it was announced on 9 April 2020 that the drama would be going on an extended hiatus on 14 April. It was later confirmed that the show would return in July 2020.

=== Development ===
Holby City was created by Tony McHale and Mal Young as a spin-off from the BBC medical drama Casualty, which is set in the emergency department of the fictional Holby City Hospital. Young wanted to explore what happened to patients treated in Casualty once they were taken away to the hospital's surgical wards. While Casualty's scope is limited to "accident of the week" storylines about patients entering hospital, Holby City allowed the possibility of storylines about long-term care, rather than immediate life and death decisions. The series was commissioned by BBC One Controller Peter Salmon, and began airing on BBC One on 12 January 1999. The series initially had the working title Holby Central, before the name was amended by the time that promotions for the programme began being broadcast over the Christmas season of 1998.

Series producer Richard Stokes believes that the series' popularity stems from the fact the hospital setting presents numerous plotline opportunities, explaining: "You have licence to create life-and-death situations every week, something you cannot do in any other set piece. The interaction of the characters can be sexy and social issues also permeate the writing. But, basically, hospital drama is successful because the viewers will forgive all the yukky bits for the wonder of a life saved." The focus of the series has developed since its conception, expanding to cover extra wards, including a gynaecology ward, an acute assessment unit and a maternity ward. When the maternity ward and a special care baby unit were introduced during series four, Young explained that new wards were necessary to allow the crew to rotate sets, maximising filming potential.

Episodes of Holby City cost around £370,000 to produce—more than the BBC soap opera EastEnders, at £130,000 per episode, but less than Casualty at £450,000 per episode, or Dalziel and Pascoe at £700–800,000 per episode. As Holby City is a high-volume, year-round production, it has relatively low production costs. Set-up costs can be spread over many years and standing sets can be repeatedly re-used, which is not the case for shorter series or one-off dramas.

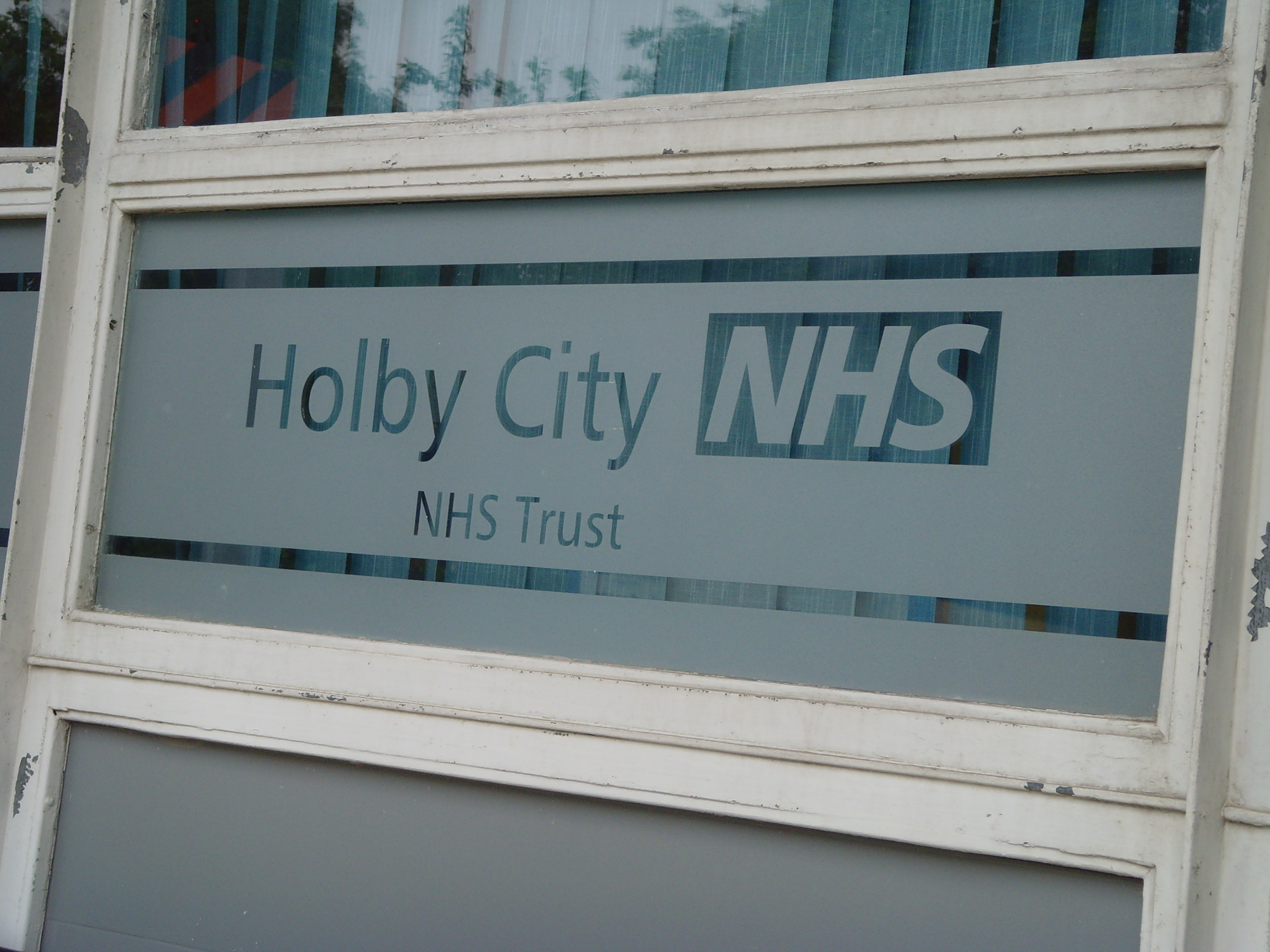
The hospital set, at BBC Elstree Centre in Borehamwood.

Young remained an executive producer of Holby City until 2004, when he left the BBC to work for production company 19 TV. Former Casualty producer Johnathan Young was an executive producer for the duration of Holby's first series, before joining Channel 4 in 1999. Kathleen Hutchison served alongside Mal Young as co-executive producer from 2003 to 2004, when she left the series to become executive producer of EastEnders. Hutchison was succeeded by former series producer Stokes, who remained working on Holby City until 2006, when McHale returned to the series. He resigned from the position in 2009, and was succeeded by Belinda Campbell in 2010.

In February 2011, it was announced that Johnathan Young would return to the BBC from March, succeeding Campbell as executive producer of both Casualty and Holby City. Two years later, the BBC advertised for a new executive producer for both shows. Oliver Kent was then announced as Young's successor, being promoted from senior producer at Holby City and series producer at Casualty. Kent was promoted to Head of Continuing Drama Series for BBC Studios in December 2016, and series producer Simon Harper was appointed the serial's acting executive producer. In June 2017, it was announced that Harper would take the job on a permanent basis. Kate Oates was hired as the show's senior executive producer in October 2018, working alongside Harper. She was promoted, succeeding Kent in his position, in April 2019. Harper remained in the role of executive producer until 2021.

=== Writing ===
Holby City storylines are planned eight months in advance. The series utilises a number of scriptwriters, who are found and scheduled by script development editor Simon Harper. Harper receives around 20 speculative scripts a week, and also finds writers through the BBC Writers Academy, a course established in 2005 which guarantees its graduates the opportunity to work on prime time television. McHale teaches at the academy, and graduate Abi Bown went on to become a regular writer for Holby City. Harper also recruits writers through the BBC's Continuing Drama Shadow Scheme, open to writers from all levels of experience. He believes that scripts which demonstrate synthesis between guest and serial storylines are "the spine of the show", and has stated that, "Good, cracking, intelligent, ballsy dialogue is a must," explaining: "It's about getting the characters' voices because the characters drive these shows. It is a love for and investment in these characters and the consistency of those characters." Harper does not require that writers are necessarily familiar with the show, and would like to attract more female scriptwriters.

McHale wrote the series' first episode, and served as the show's lead writer. His 2006 promotion to executive producer was part of a bid by Controller of BBC Drama Production John Yorke to "put writers back at the heart of the process". Yorke called McHale's promotion "fantastic", explaining: "It means that for the first time you've got a writer running one of our big powerhouse BBC1 shows." Following McHale's resignation, his replacement as lead writer was Justin Young, who intends to introduce a more writer-led commissioning process from series 13 onwards, with writers creating more of the theme and story of their episodes than was previously the case.

=== Medical accuracy ===
To ensure accuracy in scriptwriting, the serial employs a team of researchers to advise writers on nursing issues and health service politics. One medical advisor was given a cameo role in the series as an orthopaedic surgeon, and another, recovery nurse Rachel Carter, appears in Holby City as a scrub nurse. Another adviser, a heart surgeon, has occasionally left open-heart surgery to advise Holby City writers over the phone. The programme uses surgeons from different disciplines, who check scripts for accuracy. Carter believes this is particularly important in case viewers copy procedures they have seen in the show, such as CPR. Series star Amanda Mealing commented: "We pride ourselves on being realistic. You need to know what you are doing and why. It is a complex and foreign thing to act out an operation. For training, I watched a number of real ones."

Cast members are taught how to give realistic injections, monitor blood pressure and check a pulse, and some are given the opportunity to observe procedures in real hospitals. Original cast member George Irving observed coronary artery bypass surgery performed at Papworth and Middlesex Hospital in preparation for his role as Anton Meyer, while Edward MacLiam observed laparoscopic surgery being performed before joining the cast as Greg Douglas in series twelve.

The series uses operational ventilators on set and these were donated to the NHS Nightingale Hospital during the COVID-19 pandemic.

=== Filming and on-screen output ===
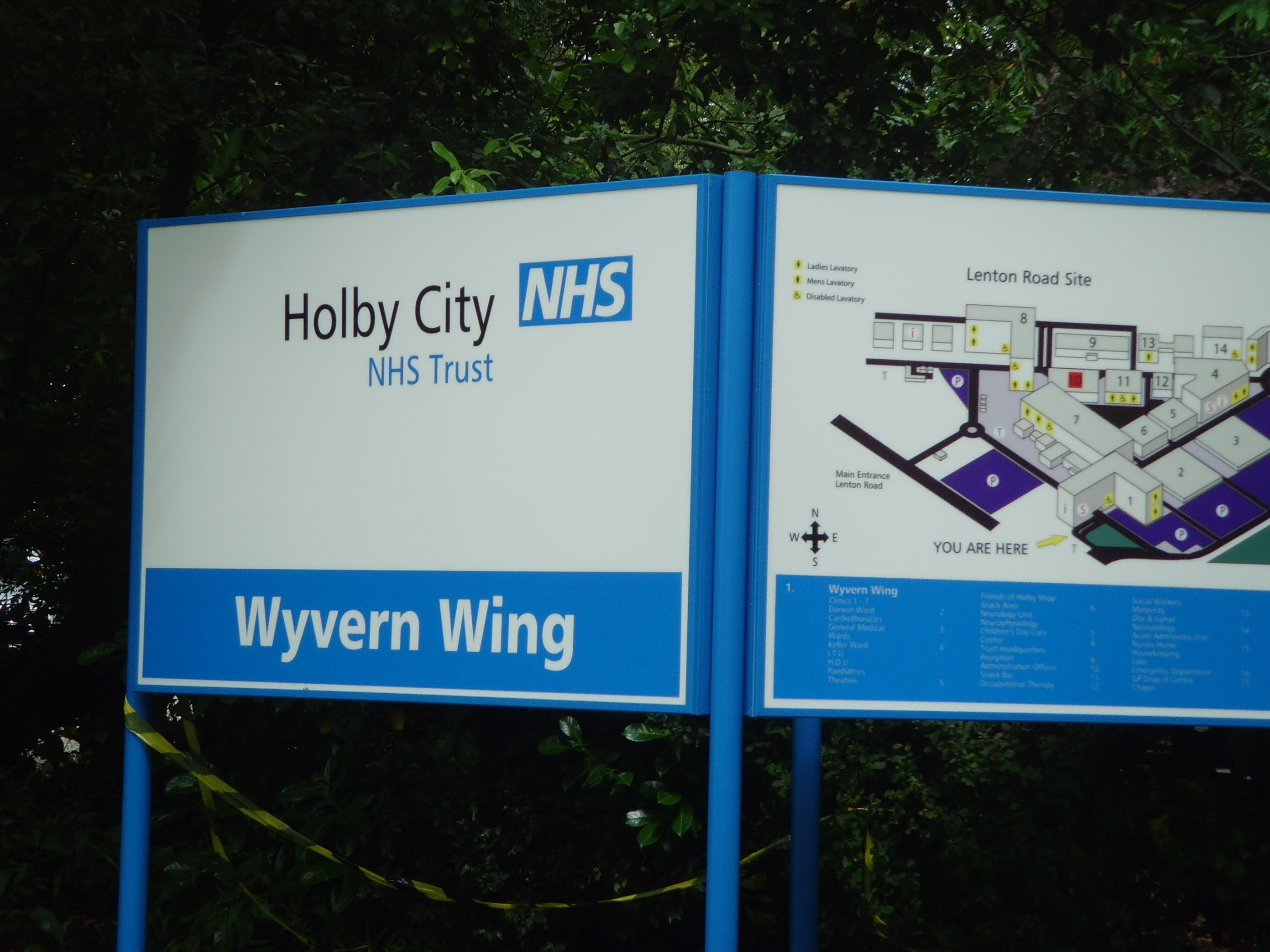
A map of the hospital's internal layout

Holby City and Casualty are both set in Holby City Hospital, in the fictional county of Wyvern, in the southwest of England close to the Welsh border. The city exterior is represented by Bristol, though Holby City is filmed at BBC Elstree Centre in Borehamwood, Hertfordshire. The Casualty set in Bristol was not large enough to encompass the surgical ward and operating theatre required for Holby City, and as a result, some crossover scenes in the first episode had to be shot twice, first on the Casualty set and then again at Elstree, with cast members travelling between the two locations. In October 2007, BBC cutbacks led The Daily Telegraph to report that the Elstree site would be sold, and Holby City relocated to share a set with Casualty, possibly in Cardiff. In March 2009, the BBC confirmed that Casualty would move to a new set in Cardiff; however, in the following month, The Guardian announced that the BBC would retain Elstree Studios for at least another four years.

Several episodes of the series have been shot on location abroad. In 2004, the romance between nurse Jess Griffin (Verona Joseph) and anaesthetist Zubin Khan (Art Malik) culminated in an episode set in Paris. The following year, registrar Diane Lloyd (Patricia Potter) followed consultant Ric Griffin (Hugh Quarshie) to Ghana as part of the BBC's "Africa lives" series, a week of programmes bringing an exploration of African culture to UK audiences. In 2006, an episode shot in Switzerland featured consultant Elliot Hope's (Paul Bradley) wife Gina (Gillian Bevan) committing assisted suicide after her motor neurone disease worsened. A 2007 episode filmed in Dubai focused on Holby registrar Joseph Byrne (Luke Roberts) meeting new nurse Faye Morton (Patsy Kensit), and in 2008, Joseph and consultant Linden Cullen (Duncan Pow) travelled to Cape Town when Faye experienced difficulties there. Series producer Diana Kyle stated in November 2008 that due to major BBC budget cuts, the series would not be filming abroad again for the "foreseeable future". However, on 10 December 2012, it was announced that the show had filmed one episode in Stockholm, which focusses on Jac tracking down hospital CEO Henrik Hanssen (Guy Henry) and exploring his backstory.

Holby City was shot using the single-camera setup. Filming occurred from 8am until 7pm daily, 50 weeks a year. From July 2007 onwards, the show took on the filmising technique, giving episodes the impression of having been shot on film. Kyle stated that this was intended to attract a younger audience and modernise the programme, and that there had been a "very positive" response to the change. On 28 May 2010, the BBC announced that it would be launching a high definition (HD) simulcast of BBC One from the autumn, and that Holby City would move to HD by the end of the year. The series moved to HD broadcasting, with a BBC HD simulcast, from the start of series 13 in October 2010.

=== Music ===
The show's eleventh series saw musical montage or "songtage" segments become standard in each episode, introduced by McHale as a means of modernising the show. Although McHale initially considered commissioning original pieces, budgetary constraints limited choices to pre-existing tracks. The use of songtages was first popularised by the US medical drama Grey's Anatomy; however, McHale stated he was unaware of this until Holby City had already adopted the technique. Music was generally selected by each episode's scriptwriter. If the writer was not specific about which songs should be used, the producers and director would select the music in post-production. Actors also have some input: Hugh Quarshie personally selected the music he believed his character Ric Griffin would listen to in theatre. Asked in June 2010 whether she felt songtages were appropriate for a serious drama show, Kyle responded: "Yes – sometimes. On a multi-strand series such as Holby, they are an excellent way of telling stories visually – a moment from each – to open or close an episode or create the passing of time in a concise way for the audience." Kris Green of entertainment and media website Digital Spy suggested that the number of songs used per episode could be "very jarring", to which Kyle replied: "We plan to use music carefully in the future – maybe 'songtages', as above – and sourced music within a scene, that is music actually playing in the scene itself, for example on a radio – but less incidental."

=== Broadcast ===
Holby City premiered on 12 January 1999 on BBC One. Twenty-three series of Holby City aired over twenty-three years, prior to the show's end in March 2022. The show's first series ran for nine episodes. In June 2000, then Director-General of the BBC Greg Dyke pledged extra funding for BBC One, some of which was used for extra episodes of Holby City. The second and third series ran for 16 and 30 episodes respectively, with new episodes then airing on a weekly basis from the fourth series onwards. Series four to nine and eleven all ran for 52 episodes, while series ten ran for 53 episodes, including the stand-alone finale episode "Mad World", set outside the hospital. All series from then on continued to consist of 52 episodes, with exception to the twelfth series, which consisted of 55 episodes in total. Young explained of the increase in series length: "Longer runs allow you to develop really strong storylines for the regular characters. As long as you do volume with passion, it'll work." The series reached its 500th episode on 13 April 2010, and its 1000th episode on 5 November 2019.

Throughout Holby City's first series, episodes were 50 minutes long. From the second series onwards, episodes have been one hour in length. The show was originally broadcast on Tuesday nights at 8.10 pm, until a switch to Thursdays occurred for the second series, which began broadcasting in November 1999. Halfway through the third series in 2001, Holby reverted to its original Tuesday night slot, but now at 8.05 pm. Finally, the show moved into the 8pm timeslot, where it has since remained. The show is occasionally broadcast on a different day dependent on BBC scheduling. In 2007, the show temporarily moved to Thursday nights, allowing HolbyBlue to air in the 8pm Tuesday timeslot. BBC One in Scotland typically broadcasts episodes at the later time of 10.45 pm.

In February 2019, it was announced that repeats of Holby City would begin airing on the channel Drama, starting from the first episode.

The programme airs in Finland on the channel Yle TV2 under the name of Holby Cityn sairaala.

=== Cancellation ===
On 2 June 2021, it was announced that Holby City had been cancelled and would conclude with the 23rd series. The final episode was broadcast in March 2022. The decision was made as part of plans from the BBC to make more programmes across the country with the intention to better reflect it. An official press release statement thanked the entire cast and crew for their work on the serial and promised that it would "[go] out on a high". Gleeson explained that his team wanted to make the series' concluding broadcasts "the most entertaining Holby yet". Hugh Quarshie, the show's longest-serving cast member, told Sarah Marsh of The Guardian that the cast and production team were informed about the cancellation one hour before its announcement.

The show's cancellation received a backlash from critics, fans and past and present cast members. Calli Kitson of Metro branded the decision "a huge mistake" and summarised, "Put simply, storylines in Holby City have saved people's lives." Borehamwood and Elstree Times writer and Elstree Studios historian Paul Welsh was disappointed by the news and felt sorry for the cast "whose fame rests on being in Holby City" and may struggle with typecasting. Quarshie, Joe McFadden (Raf di Lucca), Davood Ghadami (Eli Ebrahimi) and Luisa Bradshaw-White (Lisa Fox) were among the cast who expressed their sadness with the show's cancellation. Fans of the show launched a change.org petition to save Holby City; it reached more than 30,000 signatures in a matter of days.

== Characters and cast ==
=== Characters ===
Holby City follows the professional and personal lives of medical and ancillary staff at Holby City Hospital. It features an ensemble cast of main and recurring characters. New main characters have been both written in and out of the series regularly since it started, the show contains a core of 10 to 20 main characters on the show at any given time.

The original cast of 11 characters featured in the show's first episode consisted of consultants Anton Meyer (George Irving) and Muriel McKendrick (Phyllis Logan), registrars Nick Jordan (Michael French) and Kirstie Collins (Dawn McDaniel), senior house officer Victoria Merrick (Lisa Faulkner), ward sister Karen Newburn (Sarah Preston), theatre sister Ellie Sharpe (Julie Saunders), senior staff nurse Ray Sykes (Ian Curtis), staff nurses Julie Bradford (Nicola Stephenson) and Jasmine Hopkins (Angela Griffin), and ward clerk Paul Ripley (Luke Mably).

Towards the end of its run the show featured an ensemble of sixteen regular characters. Having originally appeared between 2004 and 2011, Jaye Jacobs reprised her role as Donna Jackson in 2017. Rosie Marcel has starred as Jac Naylor since 2005, while Sacha Levy actor Bob Barrett joined Holby City in 2010. Henrik Hanssen (Guy Henry) rejoined the show in 2015, two years after leaving a three-year stint on the show. Initially cast in a guest stint, actor David Ames (Dominic Copeland) joined the regular cast in 2014. Following his decision to leave Casualty, Alex Walkinshaw accepted an invitation to reprise his role as Adrian "Fletch" Fletcher in 2014. In 2019, Ange Godard (Dawn Steele) and Max McGerry (Jo Martin) were introduced to the series. Max's son, Louis McGerry (Tyler Luke Cunningham), was introduced in 2020, marking the introduction of the show's first regular transgender character. Following the show's production break, three new characters were introduced: Josh Hudson (Trieve Blackwood-Cambridge), Jeong-Soo Han (Chan Woo Lim), and Lucky Simpson (Vineeta Rishi). Amy Murphy joined the show's cast as Kylie Maddon in February 2021. Three regular characters were introduced in the show's final series: Eli Ebrahimi (Davood Ghadami), Madge Britton (Clare Burt), and Russell "Russ" Faber (Simon Slater).

=== Casting ===
In casting the first series of Holby City, Young—who had previously worked on the soap operas Brookside and Family Affairs—selected actors who were already established names in the acting industry, particularly from a soap opera background. French had starred in the BBC's EastEnders, while Stephenson and Faulkner had starred in Brookside. Griffin had also appeared in ITV's Coronation Street. Young explained: "Some of the best performances on screen have come out of soaps in the past few years. There is a fantastic amount of talent on those shows." This propensity for hiring established actors continued as the soap progressed, with former Brookside actress Patricia Potter cast as registrar Diane Lloyd, Star Wars actor Denis Lawson cast as consultant Tom Campbell-Gore, and Family Affairs star Rocky Marshall cast as SHO Ed Keating. Later roles were awarded to comedian Adrian Edmondson, former film actress Patsy Kensit, and Jesus of Nazareth star Powell. When Jane Asher was cast in the recurring role of Lady Byrne in 2007, Inside Soap magazine asked Kyle whether the production team intentionally sought out "well-known-names". She responded: "It's lovely when we have a new member of the cast come in and bring an audience with them. But we want the best actors, and the star names we cast are always the best – which is why we go for them."

There is a casting department at Elstree Studios which casts actors for Holby City as well as Casualty, EastEnders and Doctors. The programme also has two dedicated casting directors who bring in a shortlist of actors for the producer and director to audition. Some cast members who play main characters have made previous appearances in Holby City in minor roles. Mealing appeared as the mother of a paediatric patient in the show's fourth series, Roberts appeared as the son of a medical professor in Holby City's seventh series, and Dhillon appeared as anaesthetist Sunil Gupta in 2001. Roberts believes that his single scene in series seven was enough for him to be called in for the part of Joseph, while in contrast, Dhillon does not believe that his role contributed to his casting as Michael, but instead worried that it would work against him.

=== Guest stars ===
Holby City has featured a number of famous guest stars. Emma Samms, Antonio Fargas, Ronald Pickup and Leslie Phillips made appearances within the show's first few series, and Anita Dobson, Peter Bowles and Susannah York all appeared in the fiftieth episode. Other notable guest stars include Paul Blackthorne, Suzanne Shaw, Geoffrey Hutchings, Richard Todd, Johnny Briggs, Terence Rigby, Michael Obiora, and Lionel Jeffries. Richard Briers appeared as patient George Woodman in the Christmas episode "Elliot's Wonderful Life", Eric Sykes played Roger Ludlow, a patient with Alzheimer's disease and Phill Jupitus starred as morbidly obese patient Andy Thompson. Kieron Dyer was in four episodes as an injury prone footballer, Denise Welch had a recurring role as risk manager Pam McGrath, mother of nurse Keri, Clarke Peters appeared for five episodes in 2009 as the father of nurse Donna Jackson, and Graeme Garden had a recurring role from 2003 to 2007 as cardiothoracic consultant Edward Loftwood. Cascade Brown played Sophie Hindmarsh in 2004, Antonio Fargas appeared in 2003 as Victor Garrison, a patient with Parkinson's disease, Sheridan Smith appeared for six episodes in 2001 as teenage stalker Miranda Locke, and David Soul made two appearances as Professor Alan Fletcher. The BBC's William Gallagher wrote in a November 2001 column that Soul's guest-appearance had begun a trend for American actors appearing in UK shows. In 2012, Ron Moody guest starred as patient Vincent Mancini, a war veteran.Peter Sallis also had a guest appearance in the episode (The Morning After) where he played Lionel Davis.

In 2003, the BBC reached an agreement with the actors' union Equity to cease offering walk-on drama series roles to members of the public as prizes. When an untrained person won such a role in Holby City in a competition, Equity complained to the broadcaster that such prizes were "demeaning" to actors, depriving them of paid employment. The competition winner was allowed to visit the Holby City set, but did not appear on-screen as a result of the policy change.

== Adaptations and other appearances ==
=== Casualty@Holby City ===
Reflecting Holby City's origins as a spin-off from Casualty and the closely related premises of the two programmes, the BBC has screened occasional crossover mini-dramas entitled Casualty@Holby City, featuring a number of characters from each of the two casts. Prior to the commissioning of Casualty@Holby City, the two shows had occasionally crossed-over storylines and cast members before; for instance developing a romance between Holby City's Ben Saunders (David Paisley) and Casualty's Tony Vincent (Lee Warburton). The first full crossover was spearheaded by Casualty's executive producer Mervyn Watson, and Holby City's McHale. Logistical difficulties arose from the fact the two series are usually produced 120 miles apart, and work on both shows had to be halted for two weeks to release a number of cast members to appear in the special.

A second crossover was commissioned in 2005 as part of the BBC's DoNation season, aiming to raise public awareness of organ donation and help viewers make an informed decision about whether to sign up to the Organ Donor Register. An interactive episode of Casualty@Holby City was one of the headlining shows of the season, allowing viewers to vote by phone to determine the outcome of a fictional organ donation. The third Casualty@Holby City crossover aired in October 2005. The four-part storyline tackled the issue of youth violence, following the events of a turbulent A&E demonstration at an inner-city school. Based on the success of the 2004 Casualty@Holby City Christmas special, another crossover was ordered for Christmas 2005. Rather than dividing the episodes between the two series' crews as had previously been standard, this crossover operated as an entirely separate production, with Kyle producing and Paul Harrison directing.

In February 2010, another crossover occurred when Casualty's Charlie Fairhead (Derek Thompson) was operated on by Holby City's Elliot Hope after suffering a heart attack. The storyline was, however, broadcast as regular Casualty and Holby City episodes, rather than under the Casualty@Holby City title. Casualty's series producer Oliver Kent commented that, while it is "fantastic" to be able to produce crossover episodes, they are logistically difficult, and it is unlikely that another Casualty@Holby City episode will be produced in the "foreseeable future". In September 2010, Holby City's nurse Donna Jackson (Jaye Jacobs) appeared in Casualty, and Kent hopes that characters from the two shows will begin to crossover two or three times a year.

Despite the show's end, former cast members have continued to crossover to Casualty, starting with Alex Walkinshaw as Fletch appearing on 2 April 2022 as a continuation of plot of the final episode that aired earlier in the week. In October 2022, it was confirmed Bob Barrett would appear as Sacha Levy in a 2023 episode.

=== HolbyBlue ===
On 27 April 2006, the BBC announced the commissioning of Holby Blue, a police procedural spin-off from Holby City created by Tony Jordan. Jordan contemplated that "soap snobs" may hold the series in disdain for using the Holby brand, but concluded: "After much thought, I remembered who I was as a writer, the joy I take from surprising an audience, by subverting expectation – and HolbyBlue was born." Holby City was moved to Thursdays for the duration of HolbyBlue's first series, with the spin-off broadcast on Tuesday nights at 8 pm. A two-part crossover episode with Holby City was developed for the beginning of the show's second series, broadcast in 2008. The episodes were written by McHale and Jordan, and saw Holby City registrar Jac Naylor accused of murder. Yorke compared the crossover to the American CSI franchise, in that: "You really believe it's a world." While the second series attracted 5.6 million viewers with its opening episode, by the end of May 2008 viewership had fallen to 2.5 million. In August 2008, the BBC announced that due to declining ratings, Holby Blue would not be recommissioned for a third series.

=== Other appearances ===
In June 2002, cast members from Holby City and Casualty competed against the EastEnders cast for the first Sport Relief fundraiser, in a segment dubbed "Sport in the Square". The teams competed in events such as taxi pulling, melon tossing and a beer keg relay. The competition was televised on BBC One, and the event as a whole raised £10 million. In October 2003, BBC One aired a "Kenyon Confronts" documentary by Panorama reporter Paul Kenyon, investigating hospitals run by the Private Finance Initiative. He discovered many problems within the hospitals, which were dramatised by the Holby City cast in specially commissioned scenes. March 2004 saw the station air the documentary "Making It at Holby", as part of a BBC initiative to develop new acting talent. The documentary followed the casting process of Holby City and Casualty, from the audition stages to the filming of the selected actors' first scenes. Young explained his casting criteria, stating: "I try to put my head into the head of a viewer and ask: do I want to spend three years in the life of this person?"

The 17 November 2006 Children in Need charity telethon included a segment featuring the Holby City cast performing a comical version of "Hung Up" by Madonna. The 16 November 2007 Children in Need appeal again contained a musical performance from Holby City cast members. Sharon D Clarke, backed by Nadine Lewington, Rakie Ayola and Phoebe Thomas performed a soul version of Aretha Franklin's signature song, "Respect". On 28 June 2008, Holby City stars competed against their Casualty counterparts in a special charity edition of BBC Two game-show The Weakest Link. Holby City and Casualty cast members united on 20 February 2010, performing a dance rendition of "Jai Ho" for Let's Dance for Sport Relief.

On 12 October 2021, it was announced that Holby City would partake in a special crossover event involving multiple British soaps to promote the topic of climate change ahead of the 2021 United Nations Climate Change Conference. It was confirmed that events from Holby City would be discussed on Hollyoaks.

== Reception ==
=== Critical response ===
Holby City has attracted comparisons to other medical dramas, often unfavourable. In November 2002, John Whiston, then head of drama at Granada Television, accused the BBC of producing "ersatz parodies" of ITV drama, commenting that: "With Holby City cloned out of Casualty, the BBC has even ended up copying itself." Paul Hoggart of The Times has written that the differences between the two shows are "mild", calling Holby City: "Casualty's cute little sister". Kevin Lygo, director of television at Channel 4, referred to Holby City as "sudsy drama", deeming it, Casualty and HolbyBlue "all decent programmes, but strikingly similar in many aspects of their tone and construction." Holby City has also been unfavourably compared with the American medical drama ER. Television producer Paul Abbott has commented that although he watches ER, he does not watch Holby City as: "it looks like you've crammed one hour's drama into 26 episodes." In October 2009, former Holby City writer Peter Jukes wrote a critical piece for Prospect magazine, contrasting the show negatively with the standard of American television dramas. Jukes wrote that Holby City has become a soap opera, rather than a drama, and deemed the episodes he worked on "the most dispiriting experiences in [his] 25 years as a dramatist."

On several occasions, people within the television and entertainment industry have suggested that Holby City is a waste of the television licence fee, with some suggesting that it ought to be cancelled. In August 2002, Paul Bolt, director of the Broadcasting Standards Commission criticised BBC programming as being "humdrum" and "formulaic", saying of Holby City and the police procedural Merseybeat: "One begins to wonder what really is the point of the BBC bringing this to us. Let's have something a bit different." Then head of BBC drama Jane Tranter responded that Bolt's examples were "highly selective" as well as "hugely patronising to the millions of viewers who enjoy popular dramas like Holby City – week in, week out". Young, who at the time held the position of head of drama serials, told The Guardian: "Popular drama has always been singled out for criticism, but people are increasingly voting with their on-buttons." Also in 2002, David Cox of the New Statesman criticised BBC One's 2001 Christmas schedule, for airing Holby City against a contemporary version of Othello. On this basis, Cox advocated the abolition of the licence fee, explaining: "The BBC was invented in a period when the elite decided what the population should know. If that has gone, then the licence fee should go too." At the 2003 Edinburgh International Television Festival, BSkyB chief executive Tony Ball called for stricter restrictions on how the BBC spent licence payers' money, suggesting that Holby City be sold to the channel's commercial rivals, with the proceeds used to develop more original programming. The BBC refused Ball's suggestion, responding in a statement: "This speech clearly reflects BSkyB's view that programmes are merely a commodity to be bought and sold." In June 2004, Charles Allen, chief executive of ITV plc questioned the amount of funding spent on lengthened episodes of Holby City, and in January 2010, Janet Street-Porter of The Independent argued that Holby City was one of several series which had "come to the end of their natural life" and "should be put out of its misery."

Holby City was praised by campaigners for the Royal National Institute for Deaf People (RNID) in October 2003, when an episode which coincided with "Learn To Sign Week" used deaf actors, and featured characters communicating through British Sign Language. RNID chief executive John Low stated: "Too often individuals have to rely on family members or friends to communicate complicated personal information to professionals. This is the reason the RNID is calling on the government to channel funding into the training of British Sign Language interpreters who could then be available to NHS staff treating deaf patients." Stokes commented: "The writer had a great story he wanted to tell – for us, that's what matters first and foremost." A 2008 report into ethnic diversity on television, commissioned by Channel 4, cited Holby City as a positive example of "diverse British programm[ing]". Five years previously in 2003, former BBC host Sir Ludovic Kennedy complained that ethnic minorities were over-represented on television, prompting a BBC spokeswoman to explain that Holby City has more ethnic characters as it is set in an area where minorities account for up to 30% of the population. According to the 2001 census, the population of Bristol – which the city of Holby is loosely based upon – is 88% white and 12% ethnic minorities.

=== Realism ===
The show has been criticised for its lack of realism. Former nurse Vici Hoban commented in February 2004 that there existed three stereotypes of nurses: "sex object, doctor's handmaiden, or angel". She felt that media portrayal had amplified these misconceived views, observing that with "the syringe-toting serial killer Kelly in Holby City, realism has never been top of TV's agenda." However, Hoban felt that the worst offender at the time was the Channel 4 medical drama No Angels, which she described as: "so inaccurate that it makes Holby City look like a factual documentary." No Angels creator Toby Whithouse defended his series, stating that Holby City presents an unfair representation of nursing, deceiving viewers into believing that nursing "is a nice, clean job full of handsome doctors." Whithouse observed that the content of Holby City is defined by the watershed, describing real nursing work in contrast as "very post-watershed". In November 2009, Antony Sumara, CEO of the Mid Staffordshire NHS Foundation Hospital Trust, wrote a column criticising Holby City for misrepresenting real hospital life. Tom Sutcliffe of The Independent reviewed a December 2009 episode poorly, finding it "astonishing" that any patients leave Holby General alive, as the staff are "so busy looking stricken or lovelorn at each other".

In December 2003, Libby Purves wrote a critical opinion piece in The Times, observing that Holby City's medical staff are often depicted getting drunk in clubs, but afterwards are able to function properly at work, and that as a result, alcohol "is made to look innocent". In October 2004, Canon Kenyon Wright, chair of Alcohol Focus Scotland, criticised an episode of Holby City which saw doctors downing tequila slammers, stating that it glamorised irresponsible drinking. Similarly, in October 2007, drinks' industry body the Portman Group made an official complaint to communications regulator Ofcom about a scene in Holby City which depicted two medics drinking five shots of tequila following a stressful day at work. The body's chief executive David Poley claimed that in failing to show the negative consequences of this action, the series was presenting a "highly irresponsible portrayal of excessive and rapid drinking". Ofcom received a total of eight complaints about the incident.

Holby City has also been accused of medical inaccuracies. The British Medical Association denounced a January 2004 episode of the serial which portrayed organ donation being carried out despite withdrawal of consent by the patient's relatives. Dr Michael Wilks, chairman of the Medical Ethics Committee, stated: "This simply would not happen, but its portrayal, even in a drama, is totally irresponsible and risks causing huge damage to the already struggling transplant programme." The British Medical Association later opined that the show was giving viewers an unrealistic impression of resuscitation by typically presenting only two outcomes, death or total recovery. Andrew Thomson, a Dundee GP, deemed this "a terrible distortion of the truth." In a follow-up story for The Times, Vivienne Parry highlighted the fact that in reality, less than half of patients who require resuscitation survive the initial catastrophe and only a third of those live to leave hospital. At the Royal College of Nursing (RCN) conference in Bournemouth in April 2010, Holby City was accused of fostering unrealistic expectations of the NHS, encouraging patients to believe in miracles and fuelling compensation culture. Accident and Emergency nurse John Hill stated: "In A&E it is sometimes a fact that sadly we cannot get people through the trauma they have received. Unfortunately, unlike in Holby City, I am a mere mortal and cannot perform miracles. But many relatives believe because of that, you can. And the injury lawyers assure them that if you don't they will get recompense for it."

=== Impact ===
In October 2000, Dr John Ryan, an Accident & Emergency consultant at the Royal Sussex County Hospital in Brighton, criticised the number of patients visiting the department for minor ailments without first contacting their GP. Ryan attributed this phenomenon to patients viewing Holby City and American medical drama ER, and coming to regard hospitals as glamorous. A three-year Belgian research project, presented at a British Psychological Society meeting in September 2008, claimed that watching Holby City and similar medical dramas such as Casualty and ER had a subliminal influence on fear of illness. 1,300 teenagers were questioned on their viewing habits, and those who watched more medical dramas were found to be up to 10% more fearful about their health, with females more affected than males. Dr Jan Van Mierlo of Hasselt University stated that further research was needed into the long-term impact of television.

In 2008, Conservative Party strategists identified four archetypes based on TV programmes to help the party target swing voters. Alongside "Top Gear man", "Apprentice generation" and "Grand Designs couple", they identified "Holby City worker", a middle-ranking health service employee. The following year, strategists identified "Holby City woman" as a key voter demographic who may help the party win the 2010 General Election. The "Holby City woman" is a female voter in her 30s or 40s, employed in a clinical or clerical position or some other public sector job. She is a swing voter in General Elections, who has voted for the Labour Party in previous elections, though her identification with the Labour Party is not strong. The "Holby City woman" archetype is modelled on the character of Faye Morton.

In January 2009, Jill Berry, president of the Girls' Schools Association and head teacher at the Dame Alice Harpur School in Bedford, cited medical dramas such as Holby City as an inspiring force in increasing numbers of female students deciding to pursue careers in medicine. Berry said: "The girls see that as an exciting and dynamic way of life. They see it as making a difference to people's lives. It gives them a sense sometimes of the pressures, responsibility and adrenaline. Such TV programmes can be good, as long as they give a realistic impression." Similarly, consultant surgeon Andrew Raftery uses clips from Holby City as part of the University of Sheffield Outreach and Access to Medicine Scheme, to inspire pupils from under-represented social and educational backgrounds to pursue careers in medicine.

=== Awards and nominations ===
Holby City has been nominated for more than 100 awards, of which it has won six. The series has received five nominations for the British Academy Television Awards, winning one. Minkie Spiro was nominated for the "Best New Director (Fiction)" award in 2003 for her work on the series. The show itself was nominated for the "Best Continuing Drama" award in 2004, 2005 and 2006, winning in 2008. McHale commented on the win: "It's fantastic not being the bridesmaid", hoping that the award would help to make the serial "less of a guilty pleasure". Holby City received multiple BBC Drama Award nominations between 2002 and 2006. Its best results saw the show voted fifth "Best Drama" in 2004 and 2006. Amanda Mealing was voted fourth "Best Actress" in 2006 for her role as Connie Beauchamp, and the "Casualty@Holby City" moment where doctor Jim Brodie (Maxwell Caulfield) sacrifices his life for midwife Rosie Sattar (Kim Vithana) was voted viewers' fourth "Favourite Moment" of 2004. The series has been nominated for the "Best Drama" award at the Inside Soap Awards on six occasions—in 2004, then concurrently from 2006 to 2010.

Holby City has received multiple long-list nominations at the National Television Awards (NTAs) and TV Choice Awards. Mealing was short-listed for the "Most Popular Newcomer" award at the 2005 NTAs, and for the "Best Actress" award at the 2008 TV Choice Awards. At the 2000 Royal Television Society Awards, Sean De Sparengo and Richard Gort were nominated for the "Best Graphic Design – Titles" award for their contribution to the series. The show itself was nominated in the "Soap and Continuing Drama" category at the 2007 awards. Holby City was nominated "Best Serial Drama" at the 2008 Digital Spy Soap Awards, and in 2009, Stella Gonet was nominated for the "Acting Performance in TV (Female)" award at the British Academy Scotland Awards for her role as CEO Jayne Grayson. In 2010, the series was shortlisted in the "Best Television Continuing Drama" category at the Writers' Guild of Great Britain Awards.

At the Ethnic Multicultural Media Awards, Angela Griffin won "Best Actress" in 2000 for her role as nurse Jasmine Hopkins, and was nominated "Best TV Actress" in 2002, alongside co-star Thusitha Jayasundera for her role as registrar Tash Bandara. In 2004, Art Malik won the "Best TV Actor" award for his role as anaesthetist Zubin Khan. Nirpal Singh Dhaliwal of The Times criticised Malik's award, opining that: "A show such as Holby City doesn't merit any recognition." The show has won three Screen Nation Awards, and received nominations for a further seven. Jaye Jacobs won the "Emerging Talent" award in 2005 for her role as nurse Donna Jackson. In 2006, Rakie Ayola and Hugh Quarshie were nominated for the Female and Male "Performance in TV" awards for their roles as Kyla Tyson and Ric Griffin respectively. Sharon D. Clarke won the 2007 "Female Performance in TV" award for her role as Lola Griffin, while Ginny Holder was nominated in the same category for her role as Thandie Abebe, and Ayola received an Honourable Mention. Also in 2007, Roger Griffiths was nominated for the "Male Performance in TV" award for his role as Harvey Tyson, and Quarshie received an Honourable Mention in the same category. Quarshie went on to win "Favourite Male TV Star" in 2008. Also in 2008, Jacobs was nominated for the "Favourite Female TV Star" award, Ayola was nominated in the "Female Performance in TV" category, and the show itself was nominated for the "Diversity in Drama Production" award.

=== Ratings ===
Series	Episodes	Premiere	Finale	Viewers (in millions)	Notes
1	9	12 January 1999	9 March 1999	9.24	
2	16	25 November 1999	9 March 2000	8.98	
3	30	5 October 2000	5 June 2001	7.75	(Note: Final viewership data is unavailable for two episodes from series three. Episode six, "Moving On", recorded an overnight rating of 5.65 million; however, it was not among the 30 most viewed programmes on BBC One in the week of broadcast. As such, a final rating is not recorded by the Broadcasters' Audience Research Board (BARB). The following episode, "The Trouble With the Truth", also fell below the top 30. The series' average viewership is therefore calculated based on the remaining 28 episodes.)
4	52	9 October 2001	1 October 2002	7.51	
5	52	8 October 2002	30 September 2003	7.77	(Note: Final viewership data is unavailable for two episodes from series five. Episode 13, "Time to Kill", was not among the 30 most viewed programmes on BBC One in the week of broadcast, and as such, a final rating is not recorded by the BARB. Episode 41, "Eyes Wide Open", attained an overnight rating of 6.80 million, but also fell below the top 30. The series' average viewership is therefore calculated based on the remaining 50 episodes.)
6	52	7 October 2003	12 October 2004	7.69	
7	52	19 October 2004	11 October 2005	7.04	
8	52	18 October 2005	17 October 2006	6.50	
9	52	24 October 2006	9 October 2007	5.86	
10	53	16 October 2007	14 October 2008	5.62	
11	52	21 October 2008	13 October 2009	5.44	
12	55	20 October 2009	12 October 2010	5.62	(Note: Final viewership data is unavailable for one episode from series 12. Episode 11, "Stand By Me", recorded an overnight rating of 5.32 million; however, it was not among the 30 most viewed programmes on BBC One in the week of broadcast, and as such does not have a final rating archived by the BARB. The series' average viewership is therefore calculated based on the remaining 54 episodes.)
13	52	19 October 2010	11 October 2011	5.65	
14	52	18 October 2011	9 October 2012	4.92	
15	52	16 October 2012	8 October 2013	4.61	
16	52	15 October 2013	7 October 2014	4.38	
17	52	14 October 2014	6 October 2015	4.64	
18	52	13 October 2015	4 October 2016	4.53	(Note: Based on twenty-eight-day data.)
19	64	11 October 2016	19 December 2017	4.54	
20	52	2 January 2018	27 December 2018	5.89	
21	53	2 January 2019	31 December 2019	6.55	
22	44 (Note: Filming was suspended on 18 March 2020 due to the coronavirus pandemic.)	7 January 2020	30 March 2021		
23	50	6 April 2021	29 March 2022		
