= Faye Morton =

Fictional nurse in BBC TV medical drama

Faye Byrne
- Holby City character
- Patsy Kensit as Faye Morton in 2007
- First appearance: "Into the Dark"; 30 January 2007
- Last appearance: "The Perfect Storm"; 3 September 2019
- Created by: Tony McHale
- Portrayed by: Patsy Kensit

In-universe information
- Occupation: Ward sister (prev. Staff nurse)
- Family: David Morton (father); Lindsey Morton (mother); Carl Hewson (stepson)
- Spouses: Lucas Michaels; Donald Hewson; James Wilson; Joseph Byrne
- Significant others: Sam Strachan; Linden Cullen
- Children: Archie Morton; Harry Byrne

Faye Morton (also Michaels, Hewson, Wilson and Byrne) is a fictional character from the BBC medical drama Holby City, portrayed by actress Patsy Kensit. The character first appeared on-screen on 30 January 2007 in the series nine episode "Into the Dark". Kensit had made a former unrelated guest appearance on Holby City's sister show, Casualty, in 2001.

Faye is a Ward Sister at Holby General, with a mysterious past including two dead husbands and a disabled son. Her storylines have seen her marry registrar Joseph Byrne (Luke Roberts), and develop feelings for consultant Linden Cullen (Duncan Pow) following the death of her son. Her introductory storyline, shot on location in Dubai, in which she kills her third husband and leaves for Holby, proved so popular that Kensit was shortlisted "Best Actress" in the 2007 TV Quick and TV Choice Awards for her portrayal of the character within three months of arriving on the show. However, the dramaticism of the character's storylines and the manner in which they reflect upon real NHS nurses has attracted criticism. Kensit left the show in the series thirteen episode "Snow Queens", broadcast on 28 December 2010. In 2019, Kensit agreed to reprise the role as part of the show's twentieth anniversary celebrations.

== Development ==
=== Creation ===
Early publicity for the character gave her name as Eliza Clark. This was ultimately changed to Faye Morton, and although Faye did not first appear on-screen until January 2007, the announcement that Patsy Kensit had been cast in the role was made on 14 December 2005. Holby City's executive producer Richard Stokes and series producer Emma Turner spoke of their delight at Kensit's casting, describing her as "a talented and popular actress who lights up the screen." Kensit took the role in Holby City after two years of working on the ITV soap opera Emmerdale, commenting that she was "thrilled" to be offered the part, and was looking forward to working in London. Having formerly worked in Yorkshire to film Emmerdale, working in London reduced the actress' daily commute to 45 minutes. Television critic Jim Shelley noted that Kensit's casting in the role followed a trend of Holby City producers for hiring established actors, including comedian Adrian Edmondson and Jesus of Nazareth star Robert Powell.

In preparation for the role, Kensit spent three days shadowing a real nurse, and observed open heart surgery being performed as research. She commented on the experience: "I wanted to throw up. First of all I stood in the corner but in the end I couldn't get close enough ... nurses are incredible women. They're doing this job for next to nothing and do it with such love and care... I couldn't do it, I'd get too emotionally involved, I don't think I could cope." In 2001, Kensit had made a guest appearance in series 16 of Holby City's sister show Casualty, appearing as a domestic abuse victim and giving what TV critic Ian Hyland deemed "a convincing performance". Prior to her move into television roles, Kensit had predominantly worked in films, but explained upon joining the cast of Holby City: "Making films isn't for me any more because I'm an old girl in that world ... I've been very lucky, this is something I grew up doing, in television there's so much satisfaction ... I'll stay as long as they want me, I feel like I've come back home."

=== Personality and relationships ===
Initial publicity for the character billed her as "a nurse who has more than a few secrets to hide and an attitude that cannot fail to ruffle the feathers of her colleagues." The Daily Express have described her as "Gregarious...likes a gossip, but she's emotionally vulnerable", while Holby City actress Tina Hobley has compared Faye to her own character, Chrissie Williams, explaining that "Faye is a quieter character all round who will do anything for an easy life, whereas Chrissie likes to stir up a bit of drama. I think she sees Faye as a goody two shoes."

In the flashback episode "What Lies Beneath", exploring Faye's decision to move to Holby, she is seen to fight with her husband James, then later step over his dead body on the stairs. Shortly after arriving in Holby, the character began a relationship with cardiothoracic registrar Sam Strachan (Tom Chambers). The situation soon escalated into a love triangle, with Sam reigniting his former relationship with Faye's colleague, Matron Chrissie Williams. Kensit said of the relationship in August 2007, as the storyline was ongoing: "For Faye, Sam is not Mr Right, simply Mr Right Now. But Faye is not as sweet as she looks - there's a streak of toughness there... It's all going to get very messy!" Upon discovering Sam's infidelity, the character terminated their relationship, and became involved with his colleague Joseph Byrne.

In terms of friendships, Faye is close to Ward Sister Kyla Tyson (Rakie Ayola). Though the BBC describe Faye and Chrissie as rivals, Hobley has commented: "I'd like there to be more development with Chrissie and Faye's relationship as they've only really had Sam as a common interest up until now. I just hope its friendship that develops, because I can't bear all that bitchy cat-fighting stuff."

=== Return ===
In 2019, Kensit and Roberts agreed to reprise their roles as Faye and Joseph as part of the show's twentieth anniversary celebrations. The production team created a special episode focused on the characters of Faye, Joseph and Jac. Kensit was honoured to be asked to return and thought that the return episode was "gripping" television. She added that "Faye has changed quite a lot, it’s very feisty and there are lots of surprises! It’s also really exciting to be working with Rosie and Luke again."

Holby City's executive producer Simon Harper said that Faye and Joseph were "two huge, iconic characters" and their return would be a "nostalgic and exciting treat for long-term viewers." Harper described the "unique episode" as centric to the "classic Darwin trio with all their past tensions and rivalries bubbling to the surface." He added that Faye and Jac's infamous feud would be reignited as Jac feels insulted that Joseph returns with her "sworn enemy" Faye. Harper concluded that with "acerbic one-liners flying thicker than a blizzard, it's quintessential Holby City."

== Storylines ==
Faye arrives at Holby General in the episode "Into the Dark", requesting that registrars Joseph Byrne and Jac Naylor (Rosie Marcel) help her gain employment as a Bank Nurse. During her first few months at the hospital, Faye remains close to Joseph, but does not get on well with Jac, who she speaks to sternly about her close relationship with Joseph's father, Lord Byrne (Ronald Pickup). In the episode "What Lies Beneath", flashbacks show the trio's first meeting in Dubai. Faye's husband James reveals to her that he has lost her life savings. The pair fight, and James ends up dead at the bottom of their stairs. Faye leaves him, and returns to England with Joseph and Jac. Faye is questioned by the police about James' death but is not charged.

Faye begins a friendship with Ward Sister Kyla Tyson, and supports her through her domestic abuse ordeal at the hands of her husband, his subsequent death, and the loss of her son to foster care. She resists the advances of hospital lothario Sam Strachan, and impresses general surgical consultant Dan Clifford (Peter Wingfield) with her approach to patient care - leading to an on the spot promotion after a clash with Thandie Abebe (Ginny Holder) in the episode "Leap of Faith".

Faye begins dating Sam, unaware that he is cheating on her with Ward Sister Chrissie Williams. She ends their relationship when she discovers his infidelity and turns her attention to Joseph, who had tried to warn her about Sam's indiscretion. She supports Joseph when he is tormented by Jac about the relationship she had had with his father prior to his death. When STI clinician Tim attacks staff members with a crossbow, Faye is shot in the back, but makes a full recovery. She reveals to Joseph that she was formerly married to a much older man named Donald, who left her a substantial amount of money after his death from cancer. She is investigated by the police, who find it suspicious that she has been twice widowed. Her stepson, Carl Hewson, blackmails her for money, but is later attacked by loan sharks and dies in theatre.

Following a fight with Joseph, Faye disappears to South Africa. Joseph and consultant Linden Cullen travel there to find her, and discover that Faye has a young son, Archie, who has Lowe syndrome. He has been kidnapped by his father, Faye's first husband Lucas, and Joseph is forced to operate on him to save his life. Faye and Joseph go on to become engaged, and marry at his family home. Archie is later admitted to hospital when he accidentally swallows a whistle and he undergoes an operation to remove it and he is seemingly recovering in ICU however when nurse Lauren Minster mistakenly administers him the wrong drug Potassium, he dies. Faye is arrested for his murder when postmortem results prove inconclusive, and is suspended from work. She is acquitted when Lauren confesses, and fights with the nurse, who attempts suicide. Faye is able to make her peace with Lauren, but is unable to fully forgive her. In the aftermath of Archie's death, Faye and Joseph grow apart, and she develops romantic feelings for Linden.

Faye and Joseph separate, and she and Linden begin a relationship. Faye discovers that she is pregnant with Joseph's baby, but Linden promises to support her and they become briefly engaged. Increasingly concerned that Faye may be a pathological liar, Linden terminates their engagement. Faye is later attacked by a heroin-addicted patient, and when Linden attempts to defend her, he is hit in the head with a glass bottle and dies. Faye suffers a breakdown in the aftermath of Linden's death, and is admitted to a psychiatric unit. She self-harms, and refuses to leave the unit when she goes into labour, until Jac assures her that Joseph does not intend to take their child away from her. Faye delivers a boy by Caesarean. She initially fails to bond with him, but when Joseph puts their divorce proceedings on hold, she makes an effort and names him Harry, after Joseph's deceased younger brother. Despite Joseph's opposition, she insists on returning to the psychiatric unit.

Faye left her job on 28 December 2010 and went to live in France, leaving her son, Harry, in the care of Joseph. She returned on 3 September 2019 (series 21, episode 36, "The Perfect Storm"), as a heart transplant patient.

== Reception ==
Within four months of first appearing in Holby City, Kensit was nominated for the "Best Actress" award at the 2007 TV Quick and TV Choice Awards for her portrayal of Faye. The character's introductory episode, "Into the Dark" drew a high of 7 million viewers, while "What Lies Beneath", the flashback episode in which the character was seen to kill her husband in Dubai drew ratings of 6.32 million. The character's introduction to the series was highly publicised in the media, including a front cover and inside spread featuring Kensit discussing her new role in the week's edition of the Radio Times. The Liverpool Echo selected the character's introductory episode as a televisual 'Pick of the Day', The Mirror's TV critic Jim Shelley selected her arrival as a highlight of the week, and Kevin O'Sullivan of the Sunday Mirror described her debut as "sensational".

Faye has continued to generate high publicity for the series, with the 11 August 2007 edition of Total TV Guide featuring Kensit, Hobley and Chambers on its front cover, appearing in character to promote their love triangle storyline, and the 1 September 2007 Daily Express television supplement again featuring Kensit and Hobley on its cover, with an inside feature on the same storyline. It was reported on 19 August 2007 that Kensit's casting had "boosted the series' appeal" to such an extent that for the first time, a Holby City calendar had been commissioned. The report quoted a series insider as stating: "Patsy has really set the show off this year, and what better way to thank the dedicated fans?".

The character was heavily criticised in the July 2007 edition of the Nursing and Midwifery Council magazine. The publication discussed the topic of nurses in popular culture, and the negative impression of the nursing profession conveyed by fictional nurses. With a promotional image of Kensit as Faye adorning the front cover, the magazine asserted:

The "did she, didn't she", story of the Dubai murder of Faye Morton's partner in Holby City recently demonstrates the ease with which writers can attach terrible storylines to a caring profession. Nurses who become prostitutes to pay the bills, nurses who kill their husbands, nurses who abuse the system to get their own way - Holby City has always been a hotbed of slanderous storylines. Good people doing bad things makes excellent entertainment... The bald fact is that real life nurses doing their jobs well just aren't that entertaining.

This criticism was echoed by Shelley, who, commenting on an interview Kensit had given to publicise the show and her role with Jonathan Ross, suggested that "reality" was not a term that could be applied to Holby City's portrayal of nursing.

In July 2009, Conservative Party strategists identified "Holby City woman" as a key voter demographic who may help the party win the 2010 General Election. The "Holby City woman" archetype is modelled on Faye, a female voter in her 30s or 40s, employed in a clinical or clerical position or some other public sector job. She is a swing voter in General Elections, who has voted for the Labour Party in previous elections, though her identification with the Labour Party is not strong. Jonathan Oliver for The Times noted that "Faye Morton, the Holby City staff nurse played by Patsy Kensit is just the sort of person that Cameron might now hope to recruit".
