= Murder of Stephen Lawrence =

1993 killing in London, England

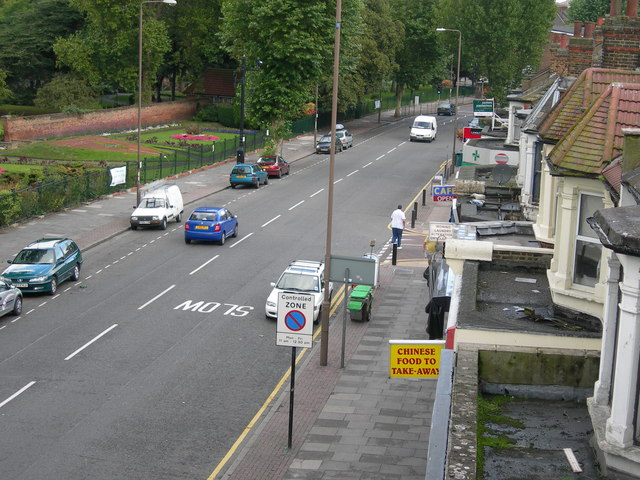
- Well Hall Road, Eltham, in 2006, near the scene of the crime.
- Date: 22 April 1993
- Location: Well Hall Road, Eltham, England; 51.46132°N 0.04955°E

Stephen Adrian Lawrence (13 September 1974 – 22 April 1993) was an 18-year-old black British student from Woolwich, southeast London, England who was murdered in a racially motivated attack while waiting for a bus on Well Hall Road in Eltham, on the evening of 22 April 1993. The case became a cause célèbre; its fallout included changes of attitudes on racism and the police, and to the law and police practice. It also led to the partial revocation of the rule against double jeopardy. Two of the perpetrators were convicted of murder on 3 January 2012.

After the initial investigation, five suspects were arrested but, at the time, not charged; a private prosecution subsequently initiated by Lawrence's family failed to secure convictions for any of the accused. It was suggested during the investigation that Lawrence was killed because he was black, and that the handling of the case by the Metropolitan Police Service (MPS) and Crown Prosecution Service (CPS) was affected by issues of race.

A 1998 public inquiry, headed by Sir William Macpherson, concluded that the original MPS investigation was incompetent and that the force was institutionally racist. It also recommended that the double jeopardy rule should be repealed in murder cases to allow a retrial upon new and compelling evidence: this was effected in 2005 upon enactment of the Criminal Justice Act 2003. The publication in 1999 of the resulting Macpherson Report has been called "one of the most important moments in the modern history of criminal justice in Britain". Jack Straw said that ordering the inquiry was the most important decision he made during his tenure as home secretary from 1997 to 2001. In 2010, the Lawrence case was said to be "one of the highest-profile unsolved racially motivated murders".

On 18 May 2011, after a further review, it was announced that two of the original suspects, Gary Dobson and David Norris, were to stand trial for the murder in the light of new evidence. At the same time it was disclosed that Dobson's original acquittal had been quashed by the Court of Appeal, allowing a retrial to take place. Such an appeal had only become possible following the 2005 change in the law, although Dobson was not the first person to be retried for murder as a result. On 3 January 2012, Dobson and Norris were found guilty of Lawrence's murder; the pair were juveniles at the time of the crime and were sentenced to detention at Her Majesty's pleasure, equivalent to a life sentence for an adult, with minimum terms of 15 years 2 months and 14 years 3 months respectively for what the judge described as a "terrible and evil crime". In March 2025 Norris eventually admitted his involvement in the crime.

In the years after Dobson and Norris were sentenced, the case regained prominence when concerns of corrupt police conduct during the original case handling surfaced in the media. Such claims had surfaced before, and been investigated in 2007, but were reignited in 2013 when a former undercover police officer stated in an interview that, at the time, he had been pressured to find ways to "smear" and discredit the victim's family, in order to mute and deter public campaigning for better police responses to the case. Although further inquiries in 2012 by both Scotland Yard and the Independent Police Complaints Commission had ruled that there was no basis for further investigation, Home Secretary Theresa May ordered an independent inquiry by a prominent QC into undercover policing and corruption, which was described as "devastating" when published in 2014.

== Stephen Lawrence ==
Stephen Lawrence
- Lawrence in 1993
- Born: 13 September 1974; London, England
- Died: 22 April 1993 (aged 18); London, England
- Cause of death: Exsanguination due to stab wounds
- Resting place: Clarendon, Jamaica
- Citizenship: British
- Education: Blackheath Bluecoat Church of England School
- Occupation: Student
- Parent(s): Neville Lawrence; Doreen Lawrence

Stephen Adrian Lawrence was born in Greenwich District Hospital on 13 September 1974 to Jamaican parents who had emigrated to the UK in the 1960s. His father was Neville Lawrence, then a carpenter, and his mother was Doreen, then a special needs teacher. Brought up in Plumstead, South-East London, he was the eldest of three children, the others being Stuart (born 1976) and Georgina (born 1982).

During his teenage years, Lawrence excelled in running, competing for the local Cambridge Harriers athletics club, and appeared as an extra in Denzel Washington's film For Queen and Country. At the time of his murder, he was studying technology and physics at the Blackheath Bluecoat School and English language and literature at Woolwich College, and was hoping to become an architect.

== Attack ==
Lawrence had spent the day of 22 April 1993 at Blackheath Bluecoat School. After school, he visited shops in Lewisham, then travelled by bus to an uncle's house in Grove Park. He was joined there by his friend Duwayne Brooks, and they played video games until leaving at around 10:00 pm. After realising that the 286 bus on which they were travelling would get them home late, they decided to change for either bus route 161 or bus route 122 on Well Hall Road.

Lawrence and Brooks arrived at the bus stop on Well Hall Road at 10:25 pm. Lawrence walked along Well Hall Road to the junction of Dickson Road to see if he could see a bus coming. Brooks was still on Well Hall Road, between Dickson Road and the roundabout with Rochester Way and Westhorne Avenue.

Brooks saw a group of six white youths, which included then–16-year-old David Norris, crossing Rochester Way on the opposite side of the street near the area of the zebra crossing and moving towards them. At or just after 10:38 pm, he called out to ask whether Lawrence saw the bus coming. Brooks claimed that he heard one of Lawrence's assailants saying a racial slur as they all quickly crossed the road and "engulfed" Lawrence.

The six aggressors forced Lawrence down to the ground, then stabbed him to a depth of about 5 inches (13 cm) on both sides of the front of his body, in the right collarbone and left shoulder. Both wounds severed axillary arteries before penetrating a lung. Lawrence lost all feeling in his right arm and his breathing was constricted, while he was losing blood from four major blood vessels. Brooks began running, and shouted for Lawrence to run to escape with him. While the attackers disappeared down Dickson Road, Brooks and Lawrence ran in the direction of Shooters Hill. Lawrence collapsed after running 130 yards (120 m); he bled to death soon afterwards. The pathologist recorded that Lawrence managing to run this distance with a partially collapsed lung was "a testimony to his physical fitness".

Brooks ran to call an ambulance while an off-duty police officer stopped his car and covered Lawrence with a blanket. Lawrence was taken to Brook General Hospital by 11:05 pm, but he was already dead.

== Trials ==
=== Witnesses ===
All three witnesses at the bus stop at the time of the attack said in their statements that the attack was sudden and short, although none were later able to identify the suspects. In the days following Lawrence's murder, several residents came forward to provide names of suspects and an anonymous note was left on a police car windscreen and in a telephone box naming a local gang as the five main suspects. The suspects were Gary Dobson, brothers Neil and Jamie Acourt, Luke Knight, and David Norris. In February 1999, officers investigating the handling of the initial inquiry revealed that a woman who might have been a vital witness had telephoned detectives three times within the first few days after the killing, and appealed for her to contact them again.

The five suspects were previously involved in racist knife attacks around the Eltham area. Four weeks before Lawrence's death, Dobson and Neil Acourt were involved in a racist attack on a black teenager, Kevin London, whom they verbally abused and attempted to stab. Neil's brother Jamie was accused of stabbing teenagers Darren Witham in May 1992 and Darren Giles in 1994, causing Giles to suffer a cardiac arrest. The stabbings of victims Gurdeep Bhangal and Stacey Benefield, which both occurred in March 1993, in Eltham, were also linked to Neil and Jamie Acourt, David Norris and Gary Dobson.

=== Initial investigations, arrests and prosecutions ===
Within three days of the crime, prime suspects had been identified. No arrests were made at the time, however, until over two weeks after the murder. The police also did not investigate the suspects' houses for four days. Detective Superintendent Brian Weeden, the officer who had been leading the murder investigation from its third day, and who led the murder squad for 14 months, explained to the McPherson inquiry in 1998 that part of the reason no arrests had taken place by the fourth day after the killing (Monday 26 April) was that he had not known the law allowed arrest upon reasonable suspicion – a basic police power under section 24 of the Police and Criminal Evidence Act 1984.

On 7 May 1993, the Acourt brothers and Dobson were arrested. Norris turned himself in to police and was likewise arrested three days later. Knight was arrested on 3 June. Neil Acourt, picked out at an identity parade, and Luke Knight were charged with murder on 13 May and 23 June 1993 respectively, but the charges were dropped on 29 July 1993, the Crown Prosecution Service citing insufficient evidence.

An internal review was opened in August 1993 by the Metropolitan Police. On 16 April 1994, the Crown Prosecution Service stated they did not have sufficient evidence for murder charges against anyone else, despite a belief by the Lawrence family that new evidence had been found. The main issue was with the identification evidence by Brooks, which was seen as both tainted by procedural irregularities, and not strong enough under case law: this view was borne out by the later private prosecution.

=== Private prosecution ===
In September 1994, Lawrence's family initiated a private prosecution against the initial two suspects and three others: Jamie Acourt, Gary Dobson and David Norris. The family were not entitled to legal aid and a fighting fund was established to pay for the analysis of forensic evidence and the cost of tracing and re-interviewing witnesses. The family were represented by leading counsel Michael Mansfield QC, assisted by Tanoo Mylvaganam and Annie Dixon who all worked pro bono. The charges against Acourt and Norris were dropped before the trial for lack of evidence. On 23 April 1996, the three remaining suspects were acquitted of murder by a jury at the Central Criminal Court, after the trial judge, the Honourable Mr Justice Curtis, ruled that the identification evidence given by Duwayne Brooks was unreliable. The costs of the prosecution were paid out of the public purse.

The Macpherson report endorsed the judgement, stating that "Mr Justice Curtis could [have] properly reach[ed] only one conclusion" and that "[t]here simply was no satisfactory evidence available".

=== Subsequent events (1994–2010) ===
After the February 1997 inquest returned a verdict of unlawful killing, the front page of the Daily Mail labelled all five suspects "murderers" and instructed them to sue if the assumption was wrong. Lawrence's parents and numerous political figures praised the Daily Mail for taking the potential financial risk of this front page.

An inquest into the death of Lawrence was held in February 1997. The five suspects refused to answer any questions, claiming privilege against self-incrimination. The inquest concluded on 13 February 1997, with the jury returning a verdict after 30 minutes' deliberation of unlawful killing "in a completely unprovoked racist attack by five white youths"; this finding went beyond the bounds of their instructions. On 14 February 1997, the Daily Mail newspaper labelled all five suspects "murderers". The headline read, "Murderers: The Mail accuses these men of killing. If we are wrong, let them sue us." Underneath this headline appeared pictures of the five suspects: Dobson, Neil and Jamie Acourt, Knight, and Norris. None of the men ever sued for defamation and strong public opinions rose against the accused and the police who handled the case.

In July 1997 an inquiry was ordered by the home secretary to identify matters related to the killing, known as the Macpherson Report, which was completed in February 1999 (see below). In 2002, David Norris and Neil Acourt were convicted and jailed for racially aggravated harassment after an incident involving a plain-clothes black police officer.

In 2005 the law was changed. As part of the findings on the Lawrence case, the Macpherson Report had recommended that the rule against double jeopardy (the common law rule that, once acquitted, an accused person could not be tried a second time for the same crime) should be repealed in murder cases, and that it should be possible to subject an acquitted murder suspect to a second trial if "fresh and viable" new evidence later came to light. The Law Commission later added its support to this in its report "Double Jeopardy and Prosecution Appeals" (2001). A parallel report into the criminal justice system by Lord Justice Auld, a former senior presiding judge for England and Wales, had also commenced in 1999 and was published as the Auld Report 6 months after the Law Commission report. It opined that the Law Commission had been unduly cautious by limiting the scope to murder and that "the exceptions should [...] extend to other grave offences punishable with life and/or long terms of imprisonment as Parliament might specify."

These recommendations were implemented within the Criminal Justice Act 2003, and this provision came into force in April 2005. It opened murder and certain other serious crimes (including manslaughter, kidnapping, rape, armed robbery, and some drug crimes) to a second prosecution, regardless of when committed, with two conditions – the retrial must be approved by the Director of Public Prosecutions, and the Court of Appeal must agree to quash the original acquittal because of new and compelling evidence.

On 27 July 2006, the Daily Mail repeated its "Murderers" front page. In July 2010, The Independent described the Lawrence killing – despite it having happened more than 17 years previously – as "one of the highest-profile unsolved racially motivated murders".

=== Cold case review and new evidence ===
Forensic scientist Angela Gallop discusses fibres and blood found in the case
from the BBC programme The Life Scientific, 27 March 2012

In June 2006, a cold case review commenced, involving a full re-examination of the forensic evidence. Initially this was held in secrecy and not publicised; however, in November 2007, police confirmed they were investigating new scientific evidence. The re-examination was led by forensic scientist Angela Gallop.

The most important of the new evidence comprised:

- A microscopic (0.5 × 0.25 mm) stain of Lawrence's blood in Dobson's jacket. It had dried into the fibres and its tiny size implied this had happened very quickly. The forensic analysis concluded it had not been transferred there from elsewhere as dried blood, or perhaps later soaked into the fabric, but was deposited fresh, and would have dried almost immediately after being deposited due to its microscopic size.
- Fibres from Lawrence's clothing, and hairs with a 99.9% chance of coming from Lawrence, found on Norris and Dobson's clothes from the time or in the evidence bag holding them. (Note: At trial the defence tried to argue, albeit unsuccessfully, that these fibres and/or hairs were present due to contamination or lack of care of evidence.)

The police unit manager involved in the matter commented that the new evidence was only found because of scientific developments and developments in forensic approaches that had taken place since 1996 which allowed microscopic blood stains and hair fragments to be analysed for DNA and other microscopic evidence to be found and used forensically.

=== 2011 – 2012 trial ===
Gary Dobson and David Norris were arrested and charged without publicity on 8 September 2010 and on 23 October 2010 the Director of Public Prosecutions, Keir Starmer QC, applied to the Court of Appeal for Dobson's original acquittal to be quashed. Dobson was in prison at the time for drug dealing. Norris had not been previously acquitted, so no application was necessary in his case. For legal reasons, to protect the investigation and ensure a fair hearing, reporting restrictions were put in place at the commencement of these proceedings; the arrests and subsequent developments were not publicly reported at the time.

Dobson's acquittal was quashed following a two-day hearing on 11 and 12 April 2011, enabling his retrial. On 18 May 2011, the Court of Appeal handed down its judgment and the reporting restrictions were partially lifted. It was announced by the Crown Prosecution Service that the two would face trial for Lawrence's murder in light of "new and substantial evidence". The judgment of the court stated that "[i]f reliable, the new scientific evidence would place Dobson in very close proximity indeed to Stephen Lawrence at the moment of and in the immediate aftermath of the attack, proximity, moreover, for which no innocent explanation can be discerned". The ruling also emphasised that this was to be "a new trial of a defendant who, we repeat, is presumed in law to be innocent," and suggested a cautious and fact-based reporting style to avoid contempt of court or risk of prejudice to the future trial.

A jury was selected on 14 November 2011, and the trial, presided over by Mr Justice Treacy, began the next day at the Central Criminal Court. With the prosecution led by Mark Ellison QC, the case centred on the new forensic evidence and whether it demonstrated the defendant's involvement in the murder, or was the result of later contamination due to police handling. The spot of blood was so small that it would have dried almost instantly, leading to the conclusion that it was transferred at the crime scene. On 3 January 2012, after the jury had deliberated for just over 8 hours, Dobson and Norris were found guilty of Lawrence's murder. The two were sentenced on 4 January 2012 to detention at Her Majesty's Pleasure, equivalent to a life sentence for an adult, with minimum terms of 15 years and 2 months for Dobson and 14 years and 3 months for Norris. Time spent on remand by Dobson was not deducted from his minimum term to ensure his existing sentence for drug-related offences was served. The judge's sentencing remarks were later published in full online.

The judge stated that the sentences reflected that Dobson and Norris were juveniles (Dobson 17, and Norris 16) at the time of the offence, which took place before the Criminal Justice Act 2003; the starting point for the minimum term was therefore 12 years. The judge acknowledged this was "lower than some might expect". A similar crime committed in 2011 as an adult would have justified a minimum sentence of 30 years. (Note: This is occasionally misreported as 25 years, the starting point for "bringing and using a weapon"; murder with racial motive incurs a higher 30-year starting point.)

=== Immediate aftermath of trial ===
Following the 2012 convictions, Paul Dacre, Daily Mail editor since 1992, issued a comment on his 1997 headline decision.

I don't think it's an exaggeration to say that if it hadn't been for the Mail's headline in 1997 —'Murderers: The Mail accuses these men of killing'—and our years of campaigning, none of this would have happened. Britain's police might not have undergone the huge internal reform that was so necessary. Race relations might not have taken the significant step forward that they have. And an 18-year-old A-Level student who dreamed of being an architect would have been denied justice. The Daily Mail took a monumental risk with that headline. In many ways, it was an outrageous, unprecedented step.

Writing in the February 2012 edition of the Socialist Review, Brian Richardson suggested that Dacre was overselling his involvement in what had finally been achieved, stating:

It is ... disingenuous of Dacre to claim that the Stephen Lawrence Family Campaign would have petered out if his paper had not ridden heroically to its rescue. The "Murderers" story appeared in February 1997, almost four years after Stephen was killed. For much of the intervening period the mainstream press, including the Daily Mail, were openly hostile and suspicious of a family that so vocally criticised the police.

=== Appeals ===
On 5 January 2012, it was reported that the Attorney General was reviewing the minimum terms at the request of a member of the public, to determine whether he believed them to be "unduly lenient", and if so whether to apply to the Court of Appeal for an increase in the minimum terms. Juvenile minimum life sentences in a 2000 review (i.e. before the 2003 act passed into law) varied from a "most common" minimum of 10 years to a maximum of 20, placing Dobson and Norris in the middle of that range. On 1 February 2012, the Attorney General announced that he would not be referring the sentences to the Court of Appeal, as he believed that "the minimum terms [were] ... within the appropriate range of sentences".

On 30 January 2012, it emerged that Norris and Dobson were seeking leave from the Court of Appeal to appeal against their convictions.

On 23 August 2012, it was reported that Norris and Dobson had lost the first round of their appeal. On 15 March 2013, it was announced that Dobson had dropped his appeal against his murder conviction. Shortly after Norris was denied leave to appeal.

On 18 May 2022, it was reported that David Norris's request to be moved to an open prison in advance of his possible release was denied.

=== Further developments ===
In 2016 police released an enhanced image from a CCTV camera, showing the face of a witness they have not been able to identify.

David Norris's minimum tariff expired in 2024 and his case was referred to the Parole Board in March 2024. In March 2025, Norris admitted for the first time that he had been involved in the murder and that he had punched Lawrence. In October he said he is "deeply sorry" to Lawrence's family for his part in the murder, but insisted that he could not name his accomplices. In December 2025, the Parole Board found that his imprisonment "continues to be necessary for the protection of the public" and denied his release or transfer to a lower category prison. It was noted that despite claiming to have overcome his racism, he had a history of racist behaviour in prison as recently as October 2023.

== Other inquiries and investigations ==
=== Macpherson Inquiry ===
On 31 July 1997, the home secretary, Jack Straw, ordered a public inquiry, to be conducted by Sir William Macpherson and officially titled "The Inquiry Into The Matters Arising From The Death of Stephen Lawrence", and published as The Macpherson report. Its report, produced in February 1999, estimated that it had taken "more than 100,000 pages of reports, statements, and other written or printed documents" and concluded that the original Metropolitan Police Service investigation had been incompetent and that officers had committed fundamental errors, including failing to give first aid when they reached the scene, failing to follow obvious leads during their investigation, and failing to arrest suspects. The report found that there had been a failure of leadership by senior MPS officers and that recommendations of the 1981 Scarman Report, compiled following race-related riots in Brixton and Toxteth, had been ignored.

Detective Superintendent Brian Weeden said during the inquiry that mistakes had been made in the murder investigation, including his own ignorance that he could have arrested the suspects four days after the killing simply on reasonable suspicion, a basic point of criminal law.

The report also found that the Metropolitan Police was institutionally racist. A total of 70 recommendations for reform, covering both policing and criminal law, were made. These proposals included abolishing the double jeopardy rule and criminalising racist statements made in private. Macpherson also called for reform in the British Civil Service, local governments, the National Health Service, schools, and the judicial system, to address issues of institutional racism.

The report was criticised in an October 2000 article in The Times by Michael Gove (later an MP and cabinet minister), who wrote, "The tendentious reasoning and illiberal recommendations of that document have been brilliantly anatomised by the ethical socialists Norman Dennis and George Erdos and the Kurdish academic Ahmed al-Shahi in the Civitas pamphlet Racist Murder and Pressure Group Politics." The pamphlet referred to by Gove is a publication by the think tank Civitas, which criticised the Stephen Lawrence Inquiry, its procedures, its findings and its reception, as well as broadly exploring what it called "The fanatical mindset... of the militant anti-racist" with references to Malcolm X among others.

The government gave the cost of the inquiry as £4.2 million, of which £3.5 million was paid by the Metropolitan Police.

=== Public complaints about mishandling of case ===
In 1997, Lawrence's family registered a formal complaint with the Police Complaints Authority (PCA), which in 1999 exonerated the officers who had worked on the case of allegations of racism. Only one officer, Detective Inspector Ben Bullock, was ordered to face disciplinary charges for neglect of duty. Bullock, who was second in command of the investigation, was later found guilty of failure to properly brief officers and failure to fully investigate an anonymous letter sent to police, but he was acquitted of 11 other charges. Four other officers who would have been charged as a result of the inquiry retired before it concluded.

Bullock retired the day after his punishment was announced, so that it amounted to a caution. Neville Lawrence, Stephen's father, criticised the punishment, saying that Bullock was "guilty on all counts." However, a spokesperson for the Metropolitan Police Federation stated that Bullock had been "largely vindicated" in the proceedings.

On 10 March 2006, the Metropolitan Police Service announced that it would pay Duwayne Brooks £100,000 as compensation for how police handled his complaints about their actions toward him after the murder, characterized as "racist stereotyping" of him as a hostile young black man, according to a statement from Brooks' solicitors firm.

=== Concerns and inquiries of alleged police corruption and undercover officer conduct ===
==== Investigation into police corruption (2006) ====
On 25 July 2006, the Independent Police Complaints Commission (IPCC) announced that it had asked the Metropolitan Police to look into alleged claims of police corruption that may have helped hide the killers of Lawrence.

A BBC investigation alleged that the murder inquiry's Det. Sgt. John Davidson had taken money from known drug smuggler Clifford Norris, the father of David Norris, a chief suspect in the investigation. Neil Putnam, a former corrupt police detective turned whistleblower, told a BBC investigation that Clifford Norris was paying Davidson to obstruct the case and to protect the suspects. "Davidson told me that he was looking after Norris and that to me meant that he was protecting him, protecting his family against arrest and any conviction," Putnam said. Davidson denied any such corruption.

The Metropolitan Police Service announced that it was to open up a special incident room to field calls from the public, following the BBC documentary The Boys Who Killed Stephen Lawrence. The Independent Police Complaints Commission later stated that the claims made in the programme were unfounded.

The need to re-establish trust between minority ethnic communities and the police is paramount... seeking to achieve trust and confidence through a demonstration of fairness will not in itself be sufficient. It must be accompanied by a vigorous pursuit of openness and accountability.

— Sir William Macpherson, Macpherson Report

On 17 December 2009, Independent Police Complaints Commission investigators and officers from the Metropolitan Police's directorate of professional standards arrested a former police constable and a serving member of Metropolitan Police staff on suspicion of attempting to pervert the course of justice by allegedly withholding evidence from the original murder inquiry, the Kent investigation and the Macpherson inquiry. Dr Richard Stone, who sat on the Macpherson inquiry, commented that the panel had felt that there was "a large amount of information that the police were either not processing or were suppressing" and "a strong smell of corruption". Baroness Ros Howells, patron of the Stephen Lawrence Charitable Trust, agreed: "Lots of people said they gave the police evidence which was never produced." On 1 March 2010 the IPCC announced that "No further action will be taken against the two men arrested following concerns identified by the internal Metropolitan police service (MPS) review of the murder of Stephen Lawrence" and the two were released from bail.

On 6 July 2023, the CPS decided that the four retired detectives who ran the original case would not face criminal charges for alleged corruption. The mother of Stephen Lawrence said she wanted to see a review of the decision.

==== Revelations about undercover police conduct (2013) ====
On 23 June 2013, an interview with Peter Francis, a former Special Demonstration Squad undercover police officer, was published in The Guardian. In the interview Francis stated that while he was working undercover within an anti-racist campaign group in the mid-1990s, he was constantly pressured by superiors to smear Lawrence's family so as to end campaigns for a better investigation into Lawrence's death. After the allegation, the home secretary, Theresa May pledged to be "ruthless about purging corruption from the police", and the prime minister, David Cameron, ordered police to investigate the allegations, saying that he was "deeply worried about the reports". This led to the commissioning of the Undercover Policing Inquiry in 2015,

Chief Constable Mick Creedon, who is leading Operation Herne, an ongoing inquiry into Metropolitan Police undercover operations against protest groups, said he would investigate the allegations as part of the inquiry. In October 2015 an inquiry was set up by the National Crime Agency to investigate allegations that members of the police force shielded the alleged killers.

==== The Stephen Lawrence Independent Review (2014) ====
Following the 2012 convictions of Dobson and Norris, further inquiries by both Scotland Yard and the Independent Police Complaints Commission ruled that there was no new evidence to warrant further investigation. After discussions with Doreen Lawrence, the home secretary Theresa May commissioned Mark Ellison QC (who had prosecuted Dobson and Norris) to review Scotland Yard's investigations into alleged police corruption.

The report, titled "The Stephen Lawrence Independent Review", was presented to Parliament on 6 March 2014. Sir Bernard Hogan-Howe, Commissioner of the Metropolitan Police said the report, which prompted an inquiry into undercover policing, was "devastating". Ellison's report also found there were possible links between an alleged corrupt police officer and the murder of private investigator Daniel Morgan in 1987.

== Legacy and recognition ==
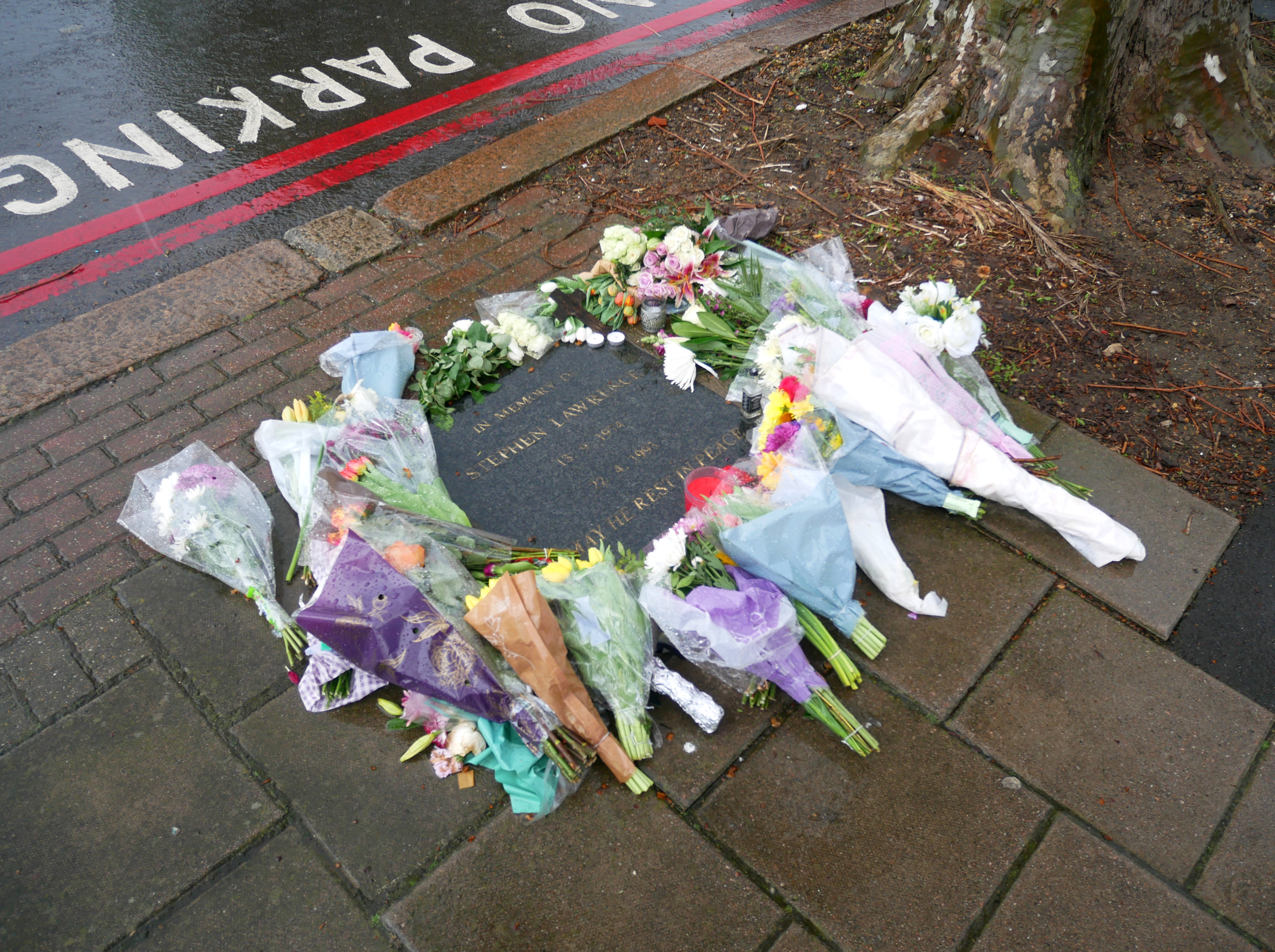
Floral tributes marking the 30th anniversary of Lawrence's murder in 2023; these have been placed around the memorial plaque to Lawrence in Well Hall Road, Eltham

An annual architectural award, the Stephen Lawrence Prize, was established in 1998 by the Marco Goldschmied Foundation in association with the Royal Institute of British Architects in Lawrence's memory.

His mother, Doreen Lawrence, said, "I would like Stephen to be remembered as a young man who had a future. He was well loved, and had he been given the chance to survive maybe he would have been the one to bridge the gap between black and white because he didn't distinguish between black or white. He saw people as people."

In 1995 a memorial plaque was set into the pavement at the spot where he was killed on Well Hall Road. The plaque has been vandalised several times since then.

In 1999, Nicolas Kent designed a documentary play based on the trial, called The Colour of Justice. It was staged at the Tricycle Theatre and was later filmed by the BBC. It was also performed at the Guildford School of Acting for the 20th anniversary of the murder.

Peter Ackroyd, in his 2000 book London: The Biography, places the murder in the context of a historical pattern of "police incompetence and corruption ... as old as the police force itself," and that the investigation "revealed many instances of bad judgement and mismanagement; it also suggested implicit racial prejudice within the police force which has indeed been bedevilled by that charge for fifty years."

On 7 February 2008, the Stephen Lawrence Centre, designed by architect David Adjaye, opened in Deptford, south-east London. A week later, it was vandalised in an attack that was initially believed to be racially motivated. However, doubt was cast on that assumption when CCTV evidence appeared to show one of the suspects to be mixed-race.

The Stephen Lawrence Charitable Trust is a national educational charity committed to the advancement of social justice. The trust provides educational and employability workshops and mentoring schemes. It also awards architectural and landscape bursaries. In 2008 the trust, with architects RMJM, created the initiative Architecture for Everyone to help promote architecture and the creative industries to young people from ethnic minorities.

In October 2012, Doreen Lawrence received a Lifetime Achievement Award at the 14th Pride of Britain Awards.

Doreen Lawrence was elevated to the peerage as a Baroness on 6 September 2013, and is formally styled Baroness Lawrence of Clarendon, of Clarendon in the Commonwealth Realm of Jamaica; the honour is rare for being designated after a location in a Commonwealth realm outside the United Kingdom. She sits on the Labour benches in the House of Lords as a working peer specialising in race and diversity.

On 23 April 2018, at a memorial service to mark the 25th anniversary of his death, Prime Minister Theresa May announced that "Stephen Lawrence Day" would be an annual national commemoration of his death on 22 April every year starting in 2019. Doreen Lawrence made a statement that Stephen Lawrence Day would be "an opportunity for young people to use their voices and should be embedded in our education and wider system regardless of the government of the day".

Part of the University of Reading's Student Union building was named after Stephen Lawrence in 1993, before being refurbished and renamed the 'Stephen Lawrence Media Centre' in 2013.

A Stephen Lawrence Research Centre was built at De Montfort University, located inside the Hugh Aston Building. Lawrence's mother was appointed chancellor of the university in January 2016. The centre hosted a series of special events for the 30th anniversary of Stephen's murder in April 2023.

== In the media ==
The case and its immediate aftermath were dramatised in the 1999 ITV film The Murder of Stephen Lawrence, starring Marianne Jean-Baptiste and Hugh Quarshie as Doreen and Neville Lawrence. A three-part sequel series, entitled Stephen, was broadcast in 2021. Quarshie reprised his role as Neville, alongside Sharlene Whyte as Doreen, and Steve Coogan as DCI Clive Driscoll.

Daily Mail journalist Stephen Wright has written about the Lawrence case, both before and subsequent to the prosecution. He received a Special Campaign Award as part of the 2012 Paul Foot Award for his work in the Lawrence case.

Novelist Deborah Crombie uses the turmoil following the Stephen Lawrence murder as a flashback setting in her 2017 book, The Garden of Lamentations. The story's characters include police officers who were undercover on both sides of the protests, as well as widespread corruption for years afterward. Crombie explains in the author's note at the end of the book that Stephen Lawrence was a real person who was murdered but specifies that the rest of the characters are fictional.

Lawrence's murder was the subject of the three-part documentary miniseries Stephen: The Murder That Changed a Nation that was first broadcast on BBC One in April 2018. Following the BBC broadcast, the Metropolitan Police publicly named Matthew White as the sixth suspect on 26 June 2023. White had died in 2021 at the age of 50.

The murder is referenced in the song "We Live Here" by English punk duo Bob Vylan.

== See also ==
- 1993 Welling riots – English riots
- Death of Paula Hounslea – Still-unsolved UK case in which the alleged killers similarly refused to answer questions at the inquest
- Murder of Anthony Walker – 2005 crime in Huyton, England
- Murder of Kelso Cochrane – 1959 murder of an Antiguan expatriate to Britain
- Murder of Kriss Donald – Scottish murder case
- Murder of Richard Everitt – 1994 murder in England
- Murder of Ross Parker – 2001 murder of an English teenager
- Race and crime in the United Kingdom

== Bibliography ==
- Ellis, Dr. Frank, The Macpherson Report: 'Anti-racist' Hysteria and the Sovietization of the United Kingdom, published by Right Now Press Ltd., London, 2001 (P/B), ISBN 978-0-9540534-0-6
- Green, David G, (Editor), Institutional Racism and the Police: Fact or Fiction, published by The Institute for the Study of Civil Society, 2000, ISBN 978-1-903386-06-4
- Dennis, Norman; Erdos, George; Al-Shahi, Ahmed; Racist Murder and Pressure Group Politics: The Macpherson Report and the Police, published by The Institute for the Study of Civil Society, 2000, ISBN 978-1-903386-05-7
- Cathcart, Brian; The Case of Stephen Lawrence published by Penguin ISBN 978-0-14-027905-4
