= Architecture for Everyone =

Youth initiative in the United Kingdom

Architecture for Everyone is a UK-wide initiative designed to enable young people aged 16–25 to use their talents for design and enthusiasm for their community in a range of creative ways related to architecture and urban design.

The initiative is a partnership between the Stephen Lawrence Charitable Trust and international architects RMJM. The project seeks to break down barriers to accessing a career in architecture, urban design, the built environment and related professions, particularly for those from Black, minority ethnic and socially excluded groups.

In 2009, Architecture for Everyone attracted the support of several design and education organisations, including The Lighthouse in Glasgow, John Moores University in Liverpool and Rich Mix in London. The Scottish Government, Urban Living (Housing Pathfinder in the West Midlands) and Places Matter! (the north east regional architecture and built environment centre) provided funding for the workshops in Glasgow, Birmingham and Liverpool.

As part of the pilot campaign, a national competition and series of workshops in cities around the country identified the most talented young people. Six finalists each won a place on an intensive summer course at the Harvard Graduate School of Design in Boston. Six runners-up were rewarded with a place on the Urban Design Summer School courtesy of CABE.

In 2010, the initiative will be following a sporting theme, to tie in with the upcoming London 2012 Olympic Games and Glasgow 2014 Commonwealth Games. Again, a nationwide series of design workshops will take place with hundreds of young people getting a once-in-a-lifetime chance to explore their creativity and find out more about a career in architecture. Two winners will travel to Hong Kong to work alongside architect John Pauline from RMJM – a leading designer of sports venues and responsible for the famous Watercube at the Beijing Olympics in 2008.

The Architecture for Everyone initiative was set up in memory of teenager Stephen Lawrence who was killed in a racially motivated attack in London in 1993. Stephen's career goal was to become an architect.
