= Waterloo Road series 6 =

Waterloo Road
- Series 6
- DVD cover
- Starring: Amanda Burton; William Ash; Karen David; Jason Done; Philip Martin Brown; Elizabeth Berrington; Chelsee Healey; Wil Johnson; Sharlene Whyte; Ian Puleston-Davies
- No. of episodes: 20

Release
- Original network: BBC One
- Original release: 1 September 2010 – 6 April 2011

Series chronology
- ← Previous; Series 5 Next → Series 7

The sixth series of the British television drama series Waterloo Road began broadcasting on 1 September 2010, and ended on 6 April 2011 on BBC One. The series follows the lives of the faculty and students of the eponymous school, a failing inner-city comprehensive school. It consists of twenty episodes, divided into two half series of ten episodes each. The sixth series achieved an average of 5.11 million viewers in the ratings.

== Plot ==
The show follows the lives of the teachers and the students at the eponymous school of Waterloo Road, a failing inner-city comprehensive, tackling a wide range of issues often seen as taboo such as a missing student, adultery, bulimia nervosa, bullying, sexism, contraception, an affair between a teacher and a pupil, child pornography, homelessness, young carers, a dog attack, Alzheimer's disease, postpartum psychosis, sexual exploitation, homosexuality, xenophobia and infertility.

== Cast and characters ==
=== Staff ===
- Amanda Burton as Karen Fisher; Headteacher (18 episodes)
- William Ash as Christopher "Chris" Mead; Deputy Headteacher and Science teacher (18 episodes)
- Karen David as Francesca "Cesca" Montoya; Head of Spanish (20 episodes)
- Jason Done as Tom Clarkson; Head of English (20 episodes)
- Philip Martin Brown as Grantly Budgen; English teacher (19 episodes)
- Elizabeth Berrington as Ruby Fry; Head of Food Technology (18 episodes)
- Chelsee Healey as Janeece Bryant; School secretary (18 episodes)
- Wil Johnson as Marcus Kirby; Geography teacher (12 episodes)
- Sharlene Whyte as Adanna Lawal; Head of Pastoral Care (10 episodes)
- Ian Puleston-Davies as Charlie Fisher; Supply teacher of Maths and Karen's husband (9 episodes)

=== Students ===
- Ayesha Gwilt as Amy Porter (20 episodes)
- Darcy Isa as Lauren Andrews (20 episodes)
- Ceallach Spellman as Harry Fisher (19 episodes)
- Linzey Cocker as Jess Fisher (19 episodes)
- Ben-Ryan Davies as Ronan Burley (19 episodes)
- Lucien Laviscount as Jonah Kirby (19 episodes)
- Jack McMullen as Finn Sharkey (19 episodes)
- William Rush as Josh Stevenson (18 episodes)
- Rebecca Ryan as Vicki MacDonald (18 episodes)
- Reece Douglas as Denzil Kelly (14 episodes)
- Shannon Flynn as Emily "Em" James (14 episodes)
- Anna Jobarteh as Ruth Kirby (13 episodes)
- Tina O'Brien as Bex Fisher (11 episodes)
- Holly Kenny as Sambuca Kelly (10 episodes)
- George Sampson as Kyle Stack (10 episodes)
- Scott Haining as Nate Gurney (9 episodes)

=== Others ===
==== Recurring ====
- Ralph Ineson as John Fry; Ruby's husband (7 episodes)
- Ciarán Griffiths as Dylan Hodge; Bex's abusive ex-boyfriend (5 episodes)
- Lorraine Cheshire as Fleur Budgen; Grantly's wife (4 episodes)
- Susan Cookson as Maria Lucas; Charlie's secret mistress (3 episodes)
- Lizzie Roper as Jackie Stack; Kyle's mother (2 episodes)
- Luke Tittensor as Connor Lewis; Pupil (2 episodes)
- Denise Welch as Steph Haydock; Former French teacher (2 episodes)

==== Guest ====
- Qasim Akhtar as Wayne Bodley; Student (1 episode)
- Jodie Comer as Sarah Evans; Student (1 episode)
- Reece Dinsdale as Matthew Gurney; Nate's father (1 episode)
- Joe Duttine as John Adams; Chair of Governors (1 episode)
- Neil Fitzmaurice as Dave Dowling; Martin's father (1 episode)
- Kieran Hardcastle as Martin Dowling; Student (1 episode)
- Jo Hartley as Laura Taylor; Billie's mother (1 episode)
- Jennifer Hennessy as Claire Evans; Sarah's mother (1 episode)
- Kelli Hollis as Chantel; Vicki's roommate (1 episode)
- Radosław Kaim as Lukas Wisniewski; Caretaker (1 episode)
- Martin Kemp as Kevin Burley; Ronan's gangster father (1 episode)
- Will Mellor as Dan Hargrove; Manager of a modelling agency (1 episode)
- Emil Marwa as Han Nichols; Business entrepreneur (1 episode)
- Nadine Rose Mulkerrin as Billie Taylor; Student (1 episode)
- Wanda Opalinska as Susan; Manager of Fleur's care home (1 episode)
- Elaine Symons as Rose Kelly; Sambuca and Denzil's mother and former canteen assistant (1 episode)
- Kaye Wragg as Hannah Kirby; Marcus' ex-wife and Jonah and Ruth's mother (1 episode)

== Episodes ==
No.	Title	Directed by	Written by	Original release date	UK viewers (million)
Autumn Term
81	"Episode 1"	Fraser MacDonald	Lisa Holdsworth	1 September 2010	5.53
There’s a big change for Waterloo Road as Karen Fisher arrives at the school as the new headteacher, replacing Rachel. Karen also makes the school a family business, as she brings in her two children, her rebellious 16-year-old daughter Jess, and her shy, kind at heart 15-year-old son Harry as students, Karen is determined to bring big changes (one of those being getting rid of the Cooler), making Waterloo Road a safe and vibrant place to learn. However, Karen's steely exterior masks a deeper fragility as she and her family wrestle with a recent tragedy. Karen's first challenge at the school arrives in the form of the Kirbys – sixth-former Jonah and 13-year-old genius Ruth – who have both been home-schooled by their father, Marcus. Marcus's ex-wife, Hannah, wants her children to experience mainstream schooling, but he has little faith in the state education system. While Jonah relishes the opportunity to make new friends and have new experiences, high-achiever Ruth feels she's got little to learn and soon takes matters into her own hands by running away. Meanwhile, Chris has slept with a girl, but when he arrives at the school he is horrified to learn that the girl was Jess. Note: First appearance of Charlie, Karen, Jess, Harry and Bex Fisher, Marcus, Jonah and Ruth Kirby, Ronan Burley and Francesca "Cesca" Montoya. Janeece Bryant returns, and Vicki MacDonald returns as a series regular.
82	"Episode 2"	Fraser MacDonald	Louise Ironside	2 September 2010	4.42
New head teacher Karen Fisher is clearly in her element at Waterloo Road and is joined at the school by her husband, Charlie, who is starting as a supply teacher. However, when their son Harry finds a suspicious message on Charlie's mobile about a lunchtime assignation, he begins to suspect his dad is having an affair. Harry dials the number on the text and is shocked to hear new Spanish teacher Cesca answer. He desperately enlists Sambuca's help and they follow Charlie on his lunchtime rendezvous. Together they spy on Charlie with Cesca, taking a photo as evidence. When Harry later tells Karen she refuses to believe him and assures him that it must be innocent.
83	"Episode 3"	Roger Goldby	Liz Lake	8 September 2010	4.66
Waterloo Road is running a new sexual health initiative which includes a confidential emergency contraception service. This causes consternation among parents and staff alike. Ronan and his girlfriend, Sarah, are concerned; their rubber broke during sex, but while Ronan wants Sarah to take the morning-after pill, she's too mortified to go to the nurse. Jess also has cause for concern: her promiscuous behaviour has resulted in her needing the morning-after pill – again. Unable to go to the nurse herself, Jess persuades Vicki to get the pill for her. Vicki reluctantly agrees, but fails when the nurse realises she's not there for herself. The two girls get into a huge fight which results in Vicki revealing Jess's promiscuity in front of Chris. Chris is concerned for Jess's welfare but she misinterprets this as a sign that he still cares for her.
84	"Episode 4"	Roger Goldby	Philip Dodds	15 September 2010	5.16
Tensions are running high at Waterloo Road as the Fishers struggle to stay united on the annual celebration of Bex's birthday, as Jess disagrees very much with the whole birthday idea. In addition, the arrival of a new, gay student sparks confrontation and unearths some difficult truths. Reluctant to return Lauren's advances, an increasingly confused Josh directs his frustration towards new student Connor with a homophobic insult. But a much deeper issue is revealed when he tries to kiss Finn, who is disgusted with his friend's behaviour and quickly spreads word of it throughout the school. Following a fight, the two friends are forced to explain their actions to Tom and Charlie. However, Josh denies the kiss ever happened, much to Tom's relief, and later tries to prove everyone wrong by getting physical with Lauren.
85	"Episode 5"	Julie Edwards	Katie Douglas	22 September 2010	4.82
Janeece and Ruby come to blows over the subject of motherhood, while Marcus's first day almost ends in disaster when his proactive approach to teaching uncovers a shocking secret about Ronan's home life. After catching Ronan selling DVDs in class, and brimming with ideas about improving parent-teacher relationships, Marcus takes it upon himself to visit Ronan's father at home. A seemingly upstanding businessman, Ronan's father is upset that his son is selling his possessions, and both he and Marcus assume Ronan must be in some sort of trouble. However, it soon becomes clear that Marcus hasn't grasped the full picture and Ronan is in fact saving the money to flee Rochdale and escape his father's illicit family business. Events reach boiling point in the corridors of Waterloo Road and Ronan is forced to make a decision that will change his life forever. Meanwhile Josh is still struggling to come to terms with his coming out, and things are not helped by Tom's interference.
86	"Episode 6"	Julie Edwards	Paul Logue	29 September 2010	4.98
Cesca is drawn into a complicated situation that threatens to end her career. Meanwhile, Grantly's increasingly slovenly behaviour causes concern for Ruby, who is facing her own problems in the form of Janeece and John's blossoming friendship. Cesca's honest approach in her drugs-awareness class backfires when Sambuca comes to her asking for money to buy drugs. Sam's intentions are good, however; she wants to buy the drugs from Amy and Lauren and then throw them away in order to protect her friends. The ever-manipulative Amy doesn't trust Sam and hatches an elaborate plan to frame her. Facing exclusion, Sam relies on the honesty of her best friend, Lauren, while Cesca's reputation lies in tatters as Karen struggles to unravel the truth. Note: Final appearance of Sambuca Kelly (until Episode 15). Return and final appearance of Rose Kelly (until Series 7).
87	"Episode 7"	Joss Agnew	Ellen Taylor	6 October 2010	4.87
Harry's bulimia reaches crisis point under the stress of bullying and his parents' separation, while the tension increases between Ruby and a heavily pregnant Janeece. Elsewhere, Waterloo Road stages the Interschool Debating Contest, giving Ruth a rare taste of popularity. When Finn discovers that Harry has sabotaged his plans for Jess to sleep over, he exacts revenge with a day of relentless bullying courtesy of him and Josh and chances upon Harry being sick in the toilet, Events reach a climax when Harry sinks to the bottom of the pool during a swimming lesson, a cry for help that leads him, Josh and Finn to Karen's office. When Harry is finally forced to reveal his condition, Karen is left questioning her role as a mother.
88	"Episode 8"	Joss Agnew	Ryan Craig	13 October 2010	4.89
Personal troubles spill over into the corridors of Waterloo Road. Vicki's home life continues to spiral dangerously out of control, Grantly's stubbornness compromises his ability as a teacher and Janeece begins to wonder if she's made the right decision about her baby. Now living in a hostel, Vicki is struggling to balance her schoolwork with visiting her critically ill dad in hospital. Following another poor exam result, a concerned Chris confronts Vicki, but she would not reveal the true extent of her dire situation and threatens Chris with blackmail if her grades are not changed. Finally, they strike a deal that helps Vicki but leaves Chris's career hanging in the balance.
89	"Episode 9"	Dermot Boyd	Neil Jones	20 October 2010	5.11
When Chris launches a trial scheme to equip the classrooms with CCTV there is uproar among both staff and pupils. Jonah is outraged when he learns that the staff room doesn't have a camera and, along with Ronan, hatches a plan to expose the hypocrisy of the scheme, unwittingly stumbling upon Jess's and Chris's secret in the process. Stunned at his discovery, he promptly hurts a bewildered Jess before launching himself at Chris in the middle of the corridor. As the pair desperately try and cover up the truth from Karen, Chris realises he must stop running from the truth. As Karen is faced with a massive decision, Marcus Kirby delivers a shocking further ultimatum to her. Elsewhere, through the aid of Jonah and Ronan's planted CCTV camera in the staff room, Grantly's shocking home life is exposed to the year 11s, who taunt him about it in class, and push him to his wits end. Desperate for help, he seeks the aid of a former colleague, and must decide where Fleur's future lies. Note: Steph Haydock returns.
90	"Episode 10"	Dermot Boyd	Nick Hoare	27 October 2010	4.48
It's the final day of term, with a charity fundraiser inspiring pupils into unique ideas. Grantly and Steph take Fleur to visit what they hope will be her new care home. However, a letter from the council to Grantly tells him that Fleur does not qualify for any sort of pension, and thus he must pay the full amount of her care, a fee which could leave him broke. Further anguish for Grantly awaits him at the school when Ruth Kirby, upon sitting an English A-Level mock, discovers that she and the rest of the A-Level students, have been taught the books set for the previous years exams, and have no knowledge of the current years set texts. The huge mistake Grantly leave his career hanging by a thread. Elsewhere, Charlie breaks some bad news upon Jess and Harry, further fuelling dislike from the pair, and a face from Karen's past returns. Note: Final appearance of Steph Haydock (until Series 17), Charlie Fisher, John Fry and Marcus Kirby (until Episode 19).
Spring Term
91	"Episode 11"	Jill Robertson	Ann McManus & Eileen Gallagher	2 February 2011	5.54
The new term kicks off at Waterloo Road with new arrivals for both staff and students. In response to the boys' poor exam grades, Karen and Chris introduce a new single-sex teaching initiative, much to the disdain of staff and pupils. Especially unimpressed is the formidable new Head of Pastoral Care, Adanna Lawal, who rallies the rest of the staffroom into action against the segregation. New boy Kyle Stack (George Sampson) arrives at the school, complete with mother and Rottweiler, Manic. Kyle's first action at Waterloo Road is a violent clash with Finn Sharkey, leading him to the cooler. In there, he meets Bex and, whilst concerned at her distress, tries to comfort her, only to have her make allegations of sexual assault from him to Karen and Chris. In response to this, Kyle pushes the boundaries and demands Bex tell the truth. Meanwhile, Ruby asks Janeece to be her classroom assistant in response to her continuous failure to control the pupils behaviour. Note: First appearance of Nate Gurney, Adanna Lawal and Kyle Stack.
92	"Episode 12"	Jill Robertson	Ann McManus & Eileen Gallagher	9 February 2011	5.44
Janeece becomes embroiled in a complicated mother-and-daughter struggle leading to a dramatic showdown at Waterloo Road. Elsewhere, a dangerous attraction begins as Cesca tutors Jonah in Spanish lessons, and Grantly's increasingly dishevelled appearance draws attention among staff and pupils. When Janeece picks up Year 10 pupil Billie Taylor on her way to school, she notices that Billie's mother, Laura, is acting as primary carer for Billie's baby, Brooke. Concerned that Laura is trying to take the baby away from Billie, Janeece takes matters into her own hands – against the advice of Chris and Adanna. Events spiral out of control between mother and daughter and it becomes difficult to tell who has the baby's best intentions at heart.
93	"Episode 13"	Fraser MacDonald	Carol Ann Docherty & Aileen Goss	16 February 2011	5.29
Karen attempts to piece together the mystery surrounding Bex's disappearance. Meanwhile, Cesca continues to test her professional and personal boundaries with Jonah and Nate feels the wrath of his father over his burgeoning relationship with Josh. Nate's uncomfortable relationship with his dad hits rock bottom when Matthew Gurney discovers that his son is gay. Unable to accept the news, Matthew blames the school for encouraging Nate's sexuality and orders him to keep away from Josh. Tom intervenes with some words of advice, prompting reconciliation with violent consequences. Two worlds collide when Grantly swaps books with Ruby and reluctantly samples the work of Jilly Cooper, a pleasure to which he refuses to admit.
94	"Episode 14"	Fraser MacDonald	Paul Logue	23 February 2011	5.16
Ruby's political views land her in hot water following the arrival of a new Polish caretaker to Waterloo Road. Cesca, meanwhile, finds it increasingly hard to resist Jonah's seductive charm; Janeece and Ronan go head to head over a stolen test paper; and Bex tries to return to normality despite the presence of Hodge. When Ruby witnesses Martin Dowling and Kyle Stack taunting new Polish caretaker Lukas Wisniewski about his right to work in the country, she controversially takes the side of the pupils. Keen to clamp down on this behaviour, Chris discovers that the normally intelligent Martin is emulating his father's right-ring views to gain approval. Lukas is pushed to the brink when Martin and Kyle step up their hate campaign, leaving Ruby condemned by the school and questioning her own views.
95	"Episode 15"	Robert Knights	Nick Hoare	2 March 2011	5.53
As Karen is refusing to let him go to his dad's, Harry's cry for attention spirals out of control when he steals Karen's phone and causes turmoil among the staff of Waterloo Road. Meanwhile, Chris and Karen have their hands full with the school business initiative contest and Tom struggles to readjust during his first day back. When Karen and Harry come to blows over his falling grades, a disgruntled Harry gets his revenge by causing mischief with Karen's phone, sending incendiary emails to the other staff in the guise of his mum. As widespread anger and paranoia spread through the school, Karen is faced with an unexpected staffroom revolt. Sambuca Kelly returns to the school. Note: Sambuca Kelly returns.
96	"Episode 16"	Robert Knights	Ellen Taylor	9 March 2011	5.54
The truth surrounding Bex's disappearance is finally revealed when a fellow pupil discovers a shocking secret. It sends shockwaves throughout Waterloo Road and tests Tom's recovery when he's forced to deal with the aftermath. Elsewhere, Sambuca and Finn's mutual antagonism develops in an unexpected way, and Jonah gives Cesca a dramatic ultimatum. Bex finally confronts Karen with the truth surrounding her disappearance when Wayne Bodley, a Year 11 pupil, stumbles across a compromising video of her and spreads the footage around the school. It could not be a worse time for Bex, as she prepares her speech on the day of the head pupil elections, and it's left to a still-fragile Tom to get to the bottom of Wayne's behaviour.
97	"Episode 17"	Jon Sen	Ryan Craig	16 March 2011	5.67
The corridors of Waterloo Road are buzzing with talk of Finn and Ronan's illegal party, but the boy's bragging ends up alienating the only two girls they want to show up: Sambuca Kelly and Vicki MacDonald. It is set to take place in an abandoned mill and word quickly spreads among the pupils, leaving the teachers in the dark. The party gets off to a good start but events escalate out of control, and it is up to Tom to save the day. Back at Waterloo Road, Cesca makes a life-changing discovery that turns her world upside down and leaves Jonah planning to abandon his education. Later, however, Jonah turns up at the party in a jubilant mood but his irresponsible behaviour leaves Cesca questioning his maturity. Bex prepares to run away with Hodge, even though Jess pleads with her to stay. When Karen finds out about Bex's plan, she enlists the help of Chris to track down her daughter. But when an increasingly desperate Hodge takes both Jess and Bex captive, there is a dramatic showdown.
98	"Episode 18"	Jon Sen	Liz Lake	23 March 2011	5.27
Cesca and Jonah make a decision that will change their lives for ever and Grantly and Ruby form an unlikely creative partnership. Ronan's mentor, Dan, a modelling industry professional, proves to be a big hit with the ladies when he is brought in to judge the school fashion show. That is, with the exception of Adanna, who takes an instant dislike to him. When Ronan teams up with Bex, Jess and Vicki for the event, he notices Vicki's lack of confidence and convinces Dan to single her out for attention. However, his well-intended plan soon spirals out of control. Cesca goes to a clinic to have a termination while Jonah tries to dissuade her.
99	"Episode 19"	Julie Edwards	Georgia Pritchett	30 March 2011	5.21
The secrecy surrounding Cesca's relationship with Jonah is finally lifted when she hands in her resignation to Karen. Elsewhere, Adanna unveils her latest plan to unite the sexes; Denzil conducts a life-threatening stunt; and creative differences threaten Ruby and Grantly's writing partnership. In a bid to finally go public with her relationship with Jonah, Cesca hands her notice in to a shocked Karen and Chris with a fabricated story about her father being sick. However, when a series of events arouses Chris's suspicions, he follows the pair and finally uncovers the truth, sending shockwaves through Waterloo Road and bringing the wrath of both Karen and Marcus. Note: Marcus Kirby returns.
100	"Episode 20"	Julie Edwards	Philip Dodds	6 April 2011	5.02
It's the day of the Waterloo Road pantomime and there's drama both on and off-stage as Finn gets Kyle purposely kicked off the cast, Cesca and Jonah rush to get married and Denzil's latest stunt ends in tragedy. When Finn goads Kyle into a fight, he gets Kyle kicked off the cast and takes the leading role himself – much to Sambuca's disgust. The bickering continues between Finn and Sambuca and, as the script veers unexpectedly off course, Kyle and Denzil exact an explosive payback, sending Adanna's good intentions up in smoke and causing possible fatality for Finn. Note: Final appearance of Ruby Fry, Marcus, Jonah and Ruth Kirby, Francesca "Cesca" Montoya, Bex Fisher, Nate Gurney and Adanna Lawal.

== DVD release ==
Three different box sets of the sixth series was released. The first ten episodes of the series were released on 7 February 2011, and the back ten episodes were released on 20 June 2011. All twenty episodes were later released together on 16 January 2012. They were released with a "15" British Board of Film Classification (BBFC) certificate (meaning it is unsuitable for viewing by those under the age of 15 years).
