= Hot Cities =

2009 British documentary series

- Narrated by: Hugh Quarshie
- Country of origin: United Kingdom
- No. of series: 1
- No. of episodes: 8

Original release
- Network: BBC World News
- Release: 24 October – 12 December 2009

Hot Cities is an environmental documentary series broadcast in Autumn 2009 by BBC World News. It highlighted the effects of global warming and climate change on the world's most populous cities.

== Episode List ==
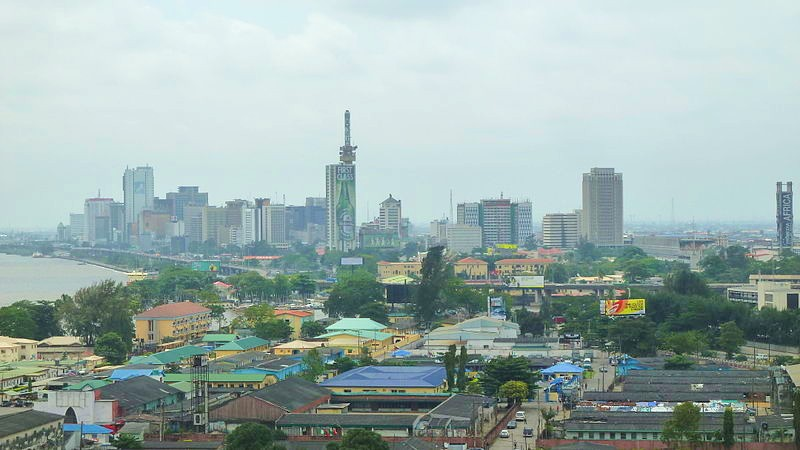
Cities in the coastal zones are the most susceptible to rising sea levels and sinking land just like Lagos, Nigeria.

Episode 1 : Bursting at the Seams- Lagos, Nigeria

Lagos is one of the fastest growing mega cities in the world. Large areas of the Lagos could be drowned by rising sea level. It is the largest city in the Western Africa which attracts millions of migratory people due to the effect of climate change and out of desperation. Rising sea levels are pushing people who live on the coastal areas, inland because they feel more protected and that they can survive better. A broader population will lead to a larger production of greenhouse emissions which will then cause more extreme events such as heat waves, floods, and droughts.

Episode 2 : Water, water everywhere- Dhaka, Bangladesh
Bangladesh is the most affected country in the world by climate change. It is constantly attacked by cyclones, coastal surges, flooding rivers and violent downpours. Millions of Climate refugee from across the country are rushing into the capital, Dhaka each year.

Episode 3 : Climate Bites- Jakarta, Indonesia

Heat tends to attract a large number of mosquito populations early on. Mosquitoes are more active in temperatures above 80 degrees. For instance, in Jakarta, the people have been dealing with disease carrying mosquitoes because of climate change. There have been instances where they even have to deal with dengue, a mosquito borne viral disease that has no cure and can lead to death, around summer when usually this type of disease is only seen around wet season. Because there is no vaccine to prevent dengue, it has been sweeping through the city at a really high rate. Jakarta is home to more than 14 million people so it will not be easy to tackle specially with climate change present apart from having to deal with their rapid urban growth, ecological breakdown, gridlocked traffic, congestion, and flooding.

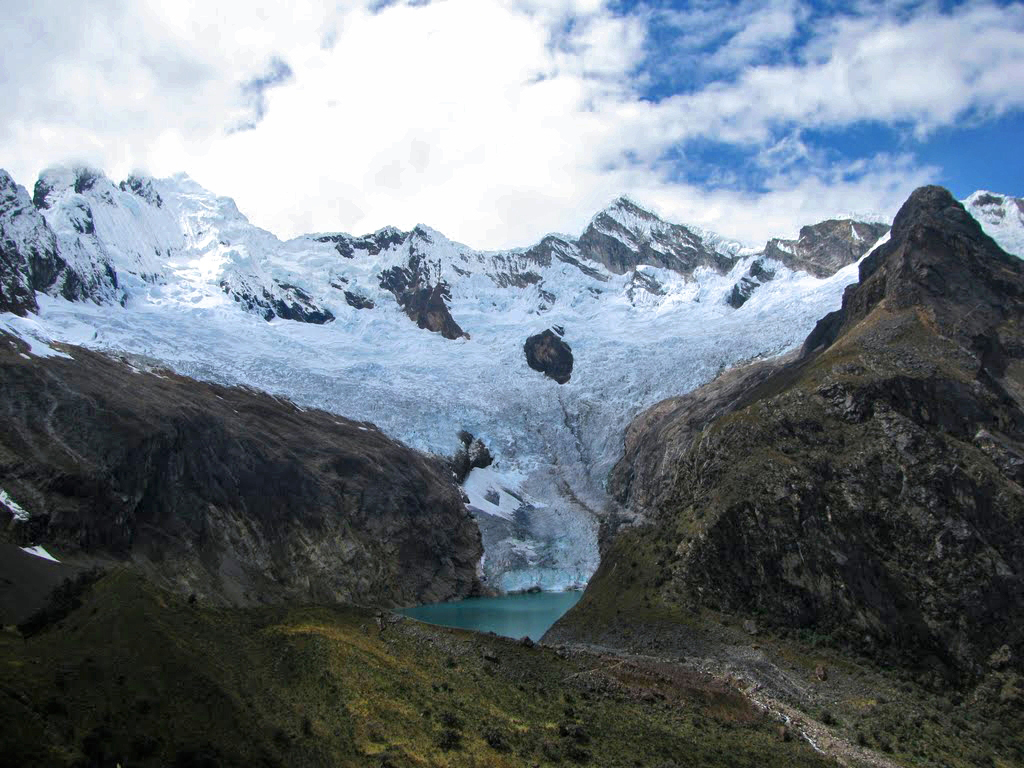
Arhuay Glacier is located in central-western Peru.

Episode 4 : Meltdown!- Lima, Peru

Lima, which is the largest city in Peru, is also one of the driest cities in the world. Twenty-five percent of Peru's population live in Lima, the state's capital, and every year more and more immigrants are flooding in because the city has more to offer than the countryside. However, even people here are now being affected by the severe drought and are running out of water. Since the city was built in the middle of the desert, the people depend on the rivers for their water that run from the glaciers which hold about 69 percent of the world's freshwater. Due to rising temperatures, the glaciers are melting at a quicker rate and becoming smaller, so not enough water is flowing through. Even then, water used to be drinkable since it was fast moving and contaminants and bacteria were being flushed away, but now that water is just sitting there and flowing at a lower speed, the inhabitants are no longer able to consume due to its dirtiness.

Episode 5 : Feed the World- Dakar, Senegal

The severe drought in Dakar affected its village in many ways. The sudden heat resulted in lower crop yields causing the city to import more food from outside sources. Because of this the cost of food production and the food prices rose by a large quantity. Food shortages lead people to abandon their villages in search of food and a better life. Also, Senegal has relied on the consumption of rice, which has been considered to be the predominant dietary energy source for 17 countries in Asia and the Pacific, ten countries in Asia and the Pacific, ten countries in Latin America and the Caribbean, one country in North Africa and seven countries in Sub-Saharan Africa, for so many years, but since it is a crop that needs so much water to grow, scientists have begun testing other crops and plants to see which ones are able to withstand the severe climate changes and for people to be able to feed themselves without having to depend on rice so much.

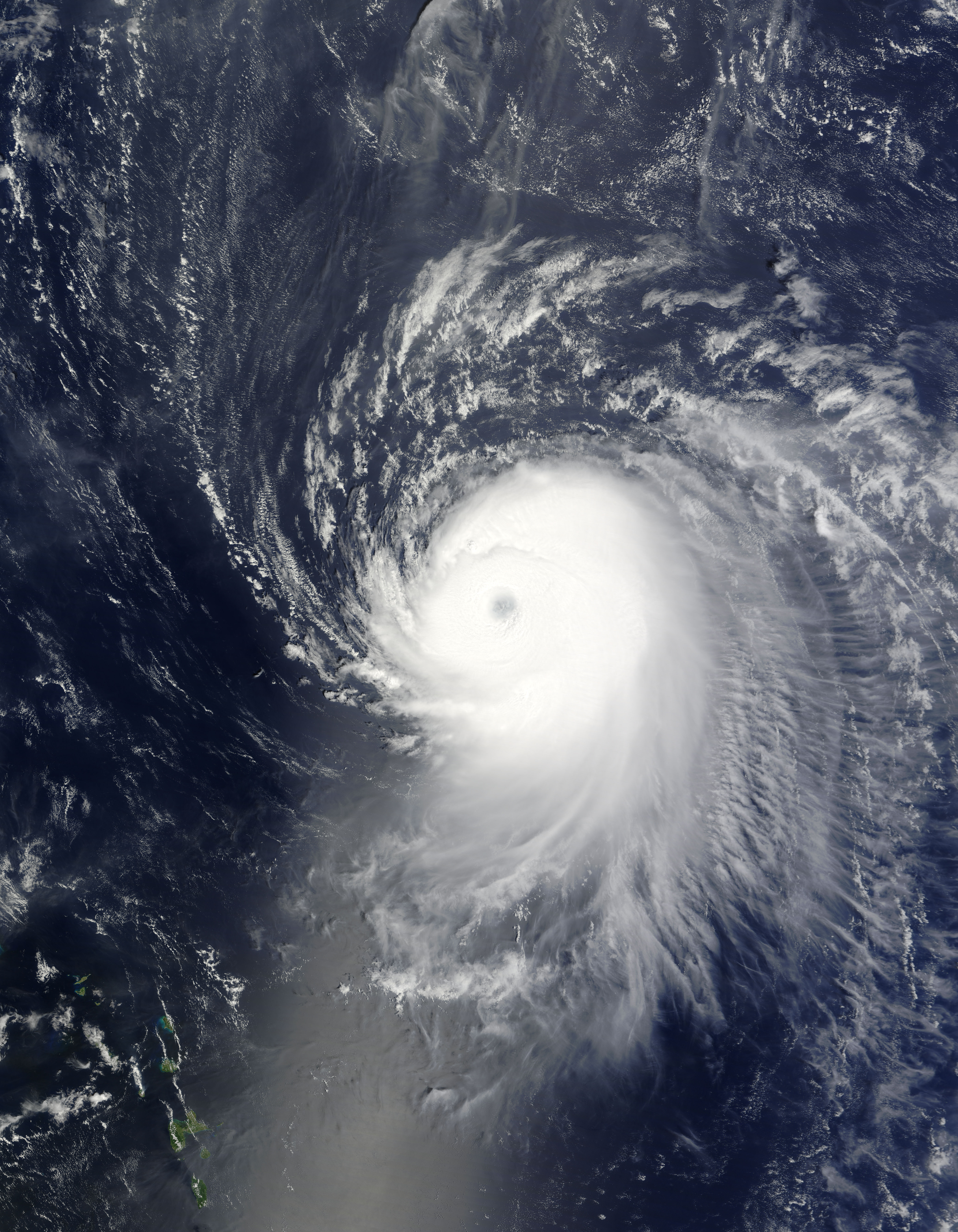
Hurricane Ike was one of the most destructive hurricanes that hit Cuba back in 2008 causing a total of $37.5 billion in damage.

Episode 6 : Surviving the Storm- Cuba

Cuba, is the largest country in the Caribbean, and the Caribbean is the largest region in the world that is more prone to hurricanes that form during summer months from warm water and moist air. Scientists and experts haven't seen much of a difference in patters or frequencies since the average number of hurricanes is still the same, however, they are increasing in terms of power, meaning they have become more destructive. With climate change, hurricanes will be much stronger and will impact a larger number of cities and there will a larger population at risk. Although Cubans are already familiar and prepared with survival strategies, since they have had a total of 56 since the early 1800s, other cities are not, and will eventually need to adapt or create an emergency plan for when a big one hits.

Episode 7 : Counting the Cost- Shanghai, China

Because sea levels have been rising, Shanghai is likely to one day end up underwater especially since it is located near the coast making it a potential victim. Shanghai has sunk more than two meters since 1921 and geologists blame pumping out too much underground water and the rapid construction of skyscrapers for accelerating the rate at which the city is sinking.

Episode 8 : Surviving Climate Change- Los Angeles

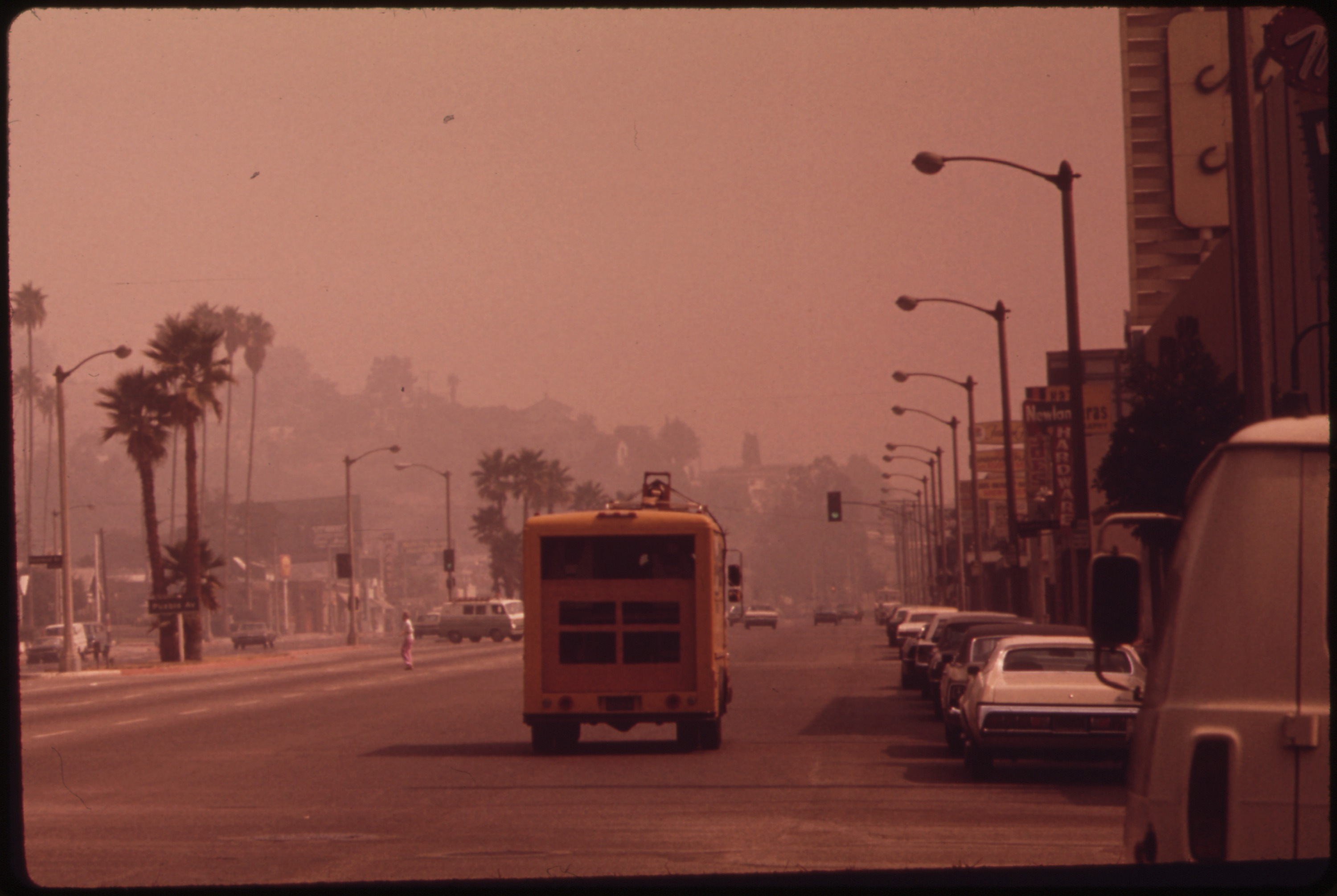
Air Pollution in Los Angeles, California

Los Angeles is home to nearly 10 million people and approximately 5,484,606 automobiles. It is considered to be the original car capital and home to the first urban freeway. About twenty-one million car trips are taken every day in Los Angeles. The U.S. produces 45 percent of all CO_{2} emissions generated by cars worldwide. Experts advise that if temperatures continue to rise at this rate, the number of fires in California will increase by up to 53 percent in the next hundred years. Los Angeles has the dirtiest air in the United States and that is why vehicle emission standards were pioneered. The U.S. is the second largest CO_{2} emitter in the world from transportation, power generation, and industry, and the planet houses an estimated 1.4 billion cars on the roads.
