= Stephen (TV series) =

2021 British television series

- Genre: Crime drama
- Based on: In Pursuit of the Truth by DCI Clive Driscoll
- Written by: Frank Cottrell Boyce; Joe Cottrell Boyce
- Directed by: Alrick Riley
- Starring: Steve Coogan; Sharlene Whyte; Hugh Quarshie
- Composer: Segun Akinola
- Country of origin: United Kingdom
- Original language: English
- No. of series: 1
- No. of episodes: 3

Production
- Executive producers: Frank Cottrell Boyce; Joe Cottrell Boyce; Paul Greengrass; Jed Mercurio; Jimmy Mulville; Mark Redhead
- Producer: Madonna Baptiste
- Running time: 60 minutes
- Production company: HTM Television

Original release
- Network: ITV
- Release: 30 August – 13 September 2021

Stephen, also titled Conviction: The Case of Stephen Lawrence, is a 2021 British three-part limited crime drama TV series. It is the sequel to the 1999 TV film The Murder of Stephen Lawrence. It stars Steve Coogan, Sharlene Whyte and Hugh Quarshie. It was written by Frank Cottrell Boyce and Joe Cottrell Boyce and directed by Alrick Riley. The series was produced for ITV by HTM Television, a joint venture between Hat Trick Productions and the producer Jed Mercurio.

== Plot ==
Based on the true story of the 1993 murder of British teenager Stephen Lawrence, the series adapts In Pursuit of the Truth by DCI Clive Driscoll. It follows Lawrence's family's fight for justice, and the police investigation which finally led to the convictions of two of his killers in 2012.

== Cast ==
- Steve Coogan as DCI Clive Driscoll
- Sharlene Whyte as Doreen Lawrence
- Hugh Quarshie as Neville Lawrence

== Episodes ==
No.	Title	Directed by	Written by	Original release date	UK viewers (millions) (Note: 7-day consolidated, excluding device and pre-transmission viewership.)
1	"Episode 1"	Alrick Riley	Frank Cottrell Boyce	30 August 2021	2.30
In 2006, Doreen Lawrence establishes a center for youth in Stephen's memory, while also taking on corruption in the Metropolitan Police, but the case is completed without the inclusion of potential corruption. DCI Clive Driscoll discovers old case files of Stephen Lawrence's case in an old station going up for sale, and decides to re-open the case. Driscoll and his team look through the existing evidence, and decides to leave forensic evidence in the hands of Angela Gallop and her team, rather than the public service. Driscoll and his team reconstruct the events of Lawrence's murder, while Gallop finds fibres from the suspects' clothes on Stephen's clothes. This becomes the first concrete evidence pointing to the previously cited suspects, and Driscoll shares the news with Stephen's parents. However, a short time later, the new findings reaches the press.
2	"Episode 2"	Alrick Riley	Joe Cottrell Boyce	6 September 2021	1.60
Driscoll limits the flow of information as a measure following leaks to the press about the investigation. His team attempt to get former witnesses to come forward, but are unsuccessful. However, after some time, an openly racist man steps forward and is willing to testify despite having been intoxicated when the attack on Stephen happened. With the help of Stephen's father, Neville, Driscoll manages to convince Stephen's fired, Duwayne Brooks, to aid the investigation and re-testify should the case reach a retrial. Gallop and her team discover blood on the suspect's clothing, which becomes sufficient for the public service to order the arrest of two suspects involved, David Norris and Gary Dobson.
3	"Episode 3"	Alrick Riley	Frank Cottrell Boyce; Joe Cottrell Boyce	13 September 2021	1.54
The police initiate their arrests of David Norris and Gary Dobson for the murder of Stephen Lawrence are subsequently sent on trial, with them pledging their innocence. The prosecution, headed by Mark Ellison, argues that the blood found among the fibres of the clothing, proves that Norris and Dobson were present when Lawrence was murdered. The defence on the other hand argues that the clothing could have been contaminated, but receive little breakthrough for their arguments. Dobson and Norris' mothers are brought in as witnesses for give the two alibis for being home when Lawrence was murdered, but the prosecution notes the inconsistency in the timing given in prior statements. Brooks also gives his accounts of what happened, but his father passes away concurrently with the trial. Driscoll offers him to take a few days rest, but Brooks remains resilient. The court reconvenes after new year, where the jury announces that they find both Norris and Dobson guilty of Lawrence's murder. The investigation into the remaining suspects continues, but Driscoll is forced into retirement. Pre-credits text reveals that Ellison's investigation discovered undercover police presence during the investigation, and the case against the remaining suspects was dropped in 2020.

== Release ==
All episodes were made available on ITV Hub as a boxset on 30 August 2021. The series was released as Conviction: The Case Of Stephen Lawrence on Paramount +, Apple TV, and Prime Video, and later on free-to-air television on SBS Television and SBS on Demand on 18 April 2023.

== Awards ==
The show was nominated under Limited Series, and Sharlene Whyte nominated in the Actor (Female) category, in the 2022 Royal Television Society Awards.
