= Anna Jobarteh =

English actress

- Born: Anna Sophie Jobarteh
- Occupation: Actress
- Years active: 2009–present
- Known for: Waterloo Road (2010–2011); Paradox (2009)

Anna Sophie Jobarteh is an English actress. She is perhaps best known for playing Ruth Kirby on the BBC school-based drama Waterloo Road. She also played a role in thriller series Paradox in 2009, when she played the role of Dionne Hudson. She later starred as Christie in a show called Combat Kids on the CBBC Channel in 2010.

== Career ==
Jobarteh began playing Ruth Kirby in the BBC school-based drama Waterloo Road in September 2010, in the first episode of the sixth series, and her character departed at the end of the series. In February 2020, Jobarteh played Kayla Miller in an episode of the BBC soap opera Doctors.

== Filmography ==
=== Film ===
Years	Title	Role	Notes
2019	Remember Me	Harper	
2020	Love Bugged	Sinead	Short film
2021	Bewildered: A COVID-19 Story	Naomi	Short film
2023	1999	Claire	Short film
2024	Keep the Faith	Sophie	Short film

=== Television ===
Years	Title	Role	Notes
2009	Paradox	Dionne Hudson	1 episode
2010–2011	Waterloo Road	Ruth Kirby	Regular role, 13 episodes
2010	Combat Kids	Christie	Regular role, 3 episodes
2012	Stepping Up	Nicole	1 episode
2013–2020	Doctors	Kayla Miller / Dani Coles / Hayley Smith	3 episodes
2016–2018	Coronation Street	Isla / Customer / Scally	3 episodes
2018	So Awkward	Grown up Jaz	1 episode
2020–2021	The Pod Play	Lisa / Sinead / Chantelle	3 episodes
2022	In From the Cold	Claire Reed	4 episodes
2023	You & Me	Emergency Nurse	1 episode
2023	Casualty	Amy Noyes	1 episode
