= Sharlene Whyte =

British actress

- Born: Sharlene Natasha Whyte; 19 May 1976 (age 50); Nottingham, England
- Other name: Sharleine Whyte
- Occupation: Actress
- Years active: 1997–present
- Notable work: The Story of Tracy Beaker (2002–2003); Waterloo Road (2009, 2011); Stephen (2021)

Sharlene Natasha Whyte (born 19 May 1976) is an English actress who is best known for playing Jenny Edwards in The Story of Tracy Beaker and Adanna Lawal, the Head of Pastoral Care, in the sixth series of Waterloo Road. She trained at RADA from 1996 till 1999.

== Filmography ==
=== Television ===
| Year | Title | Role | Other notes | Refs. |
|---|---|---|---|---|
| 1997 | The Locksmith | Mandlip | Episode: "Full Moon" | |
| 2000 | Burnside | Donna | 2 episodes | |
| 2001 | Doctors | Justine Wright | Episode: "Be Thankful for What You've Got" | |
| 2001 | My Hero | Arnie's Customer | Episode: "Pregnant" | |
| 2001 | Tinsel Town | Diane | | |
| 2002 | Casualty | Alison Phelps | Episode: Scapegoat | |
| 2002–2003 | The Story of Tracy Beaker | Jenny Ruth Edwards | Series regular, 51 episodes | |
| 2004 | Casualty | Sarah Watson | Episode: "Who Cares" | |
| 2005 | Doctors | Charlene Watson | Episode: "Free to Air" | |
| 2007–2024 | Silent Witness | Sara Okonjo; Natasha Jackson | 2 episodes | |
| 2009 | Doctors | Beverley Ottosen | Episode: "Who Cares?" | |
| 2009 | Waterloo Road | Alison Yates | Series 5; 3 episodes | |
| 2011 | Waterloo Road | Adanna Lawal | Series 6; 10 episodes | |
| 2011 | Coronation Street | Neighbour | 1 episode | |
| 2011 | Spooks | Naomi Wilson | Episode: Season 10, episode 3 | |
| 2011 | Hidden | Lisa Merrick | 1 episode | |
| 2012 | Secrets and Words | Cathy Hall | Episode: Mightier "Than the Sword" | |
| 2013 | Sadie J | Bev | Series regular | |
| 2013 | Truckers | Nurse | | |
| 2013 | Jonathan Creek | WDC Atkins | Episode: "The Clue of the Savant's Thumb" | |
| 2013 | Run | Davina | Episode: "Carol" | |
| 2013 | Doctors | PC Ottosen | Episode: "It Fits! It Fits!" | |
| 2015 | Casualty | Sally Farnworth | Episode: "Heart Over Head" | |
| 2020 | Small Axe | Agnes Smith | Miniseries; episode: Education | |
| 2020–2022 | We Hunt Together | Gill Mendy | 9 episodes | |
| 2021 | Casualty | Javine 'Jay' Adams | Series 35, episode 12 | |
| 2021 | Stephen | Doreen Lawrence | Miniseries | |
| 2022 | The Witchfinder | Catherine | Episode 3 | |
| 2023 | Lockwood & Co. | Chat Show Host | Episode: "Sweet Dreams" | |
| 2023 | Sanditon | Agnes Harmon | 2 episodes | |
| 2023 | The Doll Factory | Madame | 6 episodes | |
| 2024 | Sherwood | Pam Bottomley | 6 episodes | |
| 2024 | Mr Loverman | Donna Walker | 8 episodes | |
| 2026 | Number One Fan | Mel | TV series | |

=== Film ===
| Year | Title | Role | Other notes | Refs. |
|---|---|---|---|---|
| 2003 | Second Nature | Flight Attendant | | |
| 2003 | The Debt | Leona Tilding | | |
| 2014 | Second Coming | Bernie | | |
| 2019 | Perfect 10 | Gemma | | |

=== Video game ===
| Year | Title | Role | Other notes | Refs. |
|---|---|---|---|---|
| 2004 | The Getaway: Black Monday | Additional Voice | Voice only | |
