= Hugh Quarshie =

Ghanaian-British actor

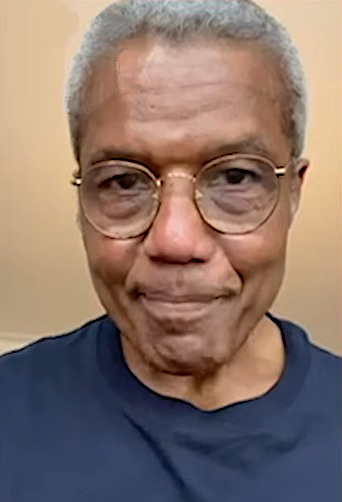
- Quarshie at German Comic Con 2024
- Born: Accra, Gold Coast (present-day Ghana)
- Education: Christ Church, Oxford
- Occupation: Actor

Hugh Quarshie is a Ghanaian-born British actor. He is known for his long-running role as Ric Griffin on the BBC One medical drama Holby City (2001–20), and for playing Captain Panaka in the Star Wars film Episode I – The Phantom Menace (1999). He is also known for stage roles with the Royal Shakespeare Company. His film work includes Highlander, Nightbreed, and Fantastic Beasts: The Crimes of Grindelwald.

== Early life and education ==
Hugh Quarshie was born in Accra, Ghana. He emigrated with his family to the United Kingdom at the age of three.

He studied PPE at Christ Church, Oxford.

== Career ==
Quarshie had considered becoming a journalist before taking up acting.

He has been a member of the Royal Shakespeare Company (RSC) since 1981 and an associate since 2005 and has appeared in many stage productions.

He has also appeared in many television programmes, including the serial Behaving Badly with Judi Dench. He is well known for playing the roles of Sunda Kastagir in Highlander, Captain Panaka in Star Wars: Episode I – The Phantom Menace, and Ric Griffin on the television series Holby City. He portrayed Lieutenant Obutu in Wing Commander.

He appeared in the 2007 two-part Doctor Who episode "Daleks in Manhattan"/"Evolution of the Daleks" as Solomon, the leader of the shanty town Hooverville. He headed the cast of Michele Soavi's The Church (1989) as Father Gus, and played Aaron the Moor in the BBC Television Shakespeare's Titus Andronicus.

Quarshie has also narrated for television. His work includes the 2006 documentary Mega Falls of Iguacu (about the Iguaçu Falls), the 2009 adaptation of Small Island, and the 2010 BBC Wildlife series The Great Rift: Africa's Wild Heart.

== Personal life ==
In September 2010, Quarshie featured in an episode of the television genealogy series Who Do You Think You Are?, in which he traced his Ghanaian and Dutch origins. The episode revealed that Quarshie is part of his country's old mixed-race elite as one of his ancestors, Pieter Martinus Johannes Kamerling, was a Dutch official on the Gold Coast. This also made him a distant relative of Dutch actor Antonie Kamerling. One of his other ancestors, Jan ter Meulen, was also a Dutch official on the Gold Coast. He also has English ancestry as one of his other ancestors, Louis Waistell Phillips, was a British official on the Gold Coast.

Quarshie was a supporter of the Women's Equality Party.

== Awards and nominations ==
In 1987, he was nominated for the Laurence Olivier Award for Best Actor and in 2022 he was nominated for the British Academy Television Award for Best Actor for playing Neville Lawrence in Stephen.

He has also won a Critics' Circle Theatre Award and an Emmy Award.

== Filmography ==
=== Film ===
Year	Title	Role	Notes
1980	The Dogs of War	Zangaron Officer	
1985	Baby: Secret of the Lost Legend	Kenge Obe	
1986	Highlander	Sunda Kastagir	
1989	La Chiesa	Father Gus	
1990	Nightbreed	Detective Joyce	
1999	Wing Commander	Lieutenant Obutu	
1999	Star Wars: Episode I – The Phantom Menace	Captain Panaka	
2000	It Was An Accident	George Hurlock	
2000	Threesome	Dave	Short film
2003	Conspiracy of Silence	Fr Joseph Ennis, SJ	
2011	Ghosted	Ade	
2012	Black Magic		Short film
2013	The Meeting	Jack	Short film
2018	Red Sparrow	Simon Benford	
2018	Fantastic Beasts: The Crimes of Grindelwald	Mustafa Kama	
2020	What Matters	Ewan	Short film
2021	Fire Ants	Ewen	Short film
2022	The Railway Children Return	General Harrison	
2022	The Son	Dr. Harris	
2023	Book Club: The Next Chapter	Ousmane	
2024	The Return	Imphinomous	

=== Television ===
Year	Title	Role	Notes
1968	Scene		Episode: "Wide Games"
1979	The Knowledge	Campion	TV movie
1980	Buccaneer	Major Nbodi	2 episodes
1981	Wolcott	Dennis St George	Miniseries
1981	The Jail Diary of Albie Sachs	Danny Young	TV movie
1981	A Midsummer Night's Dream	Philostrate	TV movie
1983	Rumpole of the Bailey	Jonathan Mazenze	Episode: "Rumpole and the Golden Thread"
1983	Angels	Turi Mimi	2 episodes
1984	Sharma and Beyond	Man on Stairs	TV movie
1985	Titus Andronicus	Aaron	TV movie
1985	Alas Smith and Jones		1 episode
1986–89	ScreenPlay	Mike / Wallace	2 episodes
1988	A Gentleman's Club	Baba	Episode: A Question of Er...
1989	Behaving Badly	Daniel	4 episodes
1991	Chancer	Kazeem	2 episodes
1991	Press Gang	Inspector Hibbert	2 episodes
1992–94	Medics	Dr. Tom Carey	19 episodes
1992	Surgical Spirit	Fergus Debonaire	1 episode
1992	Virtual Murder	Dr. Mellor	Episode: A Dream of Dracula
1992	The Tomorrow People	Professor John Galt	5 episodes (The 5-part story officially known as "The Origin Story")
1993	The Comic Strip Presents...	Lieutenant Delaney	Episode: Gregory: Diary of a Nutcase
1993	Red Dwarf	Computer Voice	Episode: "Emohawk: Polymorph II"
1994	Horizon	Narrator (voice)	Documentary
1994	The Chief	Vincent Pierce	1 episode
1994	MacGyver: Lost Treasure of Atlantis	Inspector Rhodes	TV movie
1994	Shakespeare: The Animated Tales	Cassius (voice)	Episode: Julius Caesar
1999	The Murder of Stephen Lawrence	Neville Lawrence	TV movie
2000	Arabian Nights	Mustappa	Miniseries
2000	Jason and the Argonauts	Chiron the Centaur	Miniseries
2001	In Deep	Jim Craddock	
2001–2020, 2022	Holby City	Ric Griffin	506 episodes
2002	Hornblower	Francois Lefanu	Episode: "Retribution"
2004–2019	Casualty	Ric Griffin	
2007	Doctor Who	Solomon	Episodes: "Daleks in Manhattan" and "Evolution of the Daleks"
2009	Hot Cities	Narrator	8 episodes
2009	Small Island	Narrator/adult Michael junior	2 episodes
2012	White Heat	Victor	6 episodes
2017	Still Star-Crossed	Prince Cosimo	3 episodes
2019	Absentia	Dr. Semo Oduwale	Season 2
2021	Stephen	Neville Lawrence	Miniseries
2021–2022	Breeders	Alex	6 episodes
2022	Vera	Dr. Leon Palmer	Episode: "Vital Signs"
2022	Silent Witness		Series 25; Episode: "History Part 1"
2022	Riches	Stephen Richards	
2023	Maryland	Pete	3 episodes
2024	McDonald & Dodds	Clarence Adderley	Episode: "Jinxy Sings The Blues"
2025	The Rainmaker	Wilfred R. Keeley	4 episodes

=== Theatre ===
Year	Title	Role	Notes
1984	Cymbeline	Posthumous	Royal Exchange, Manchester
1985	The Admirable Crichton	Crichton	Royal Exchange, Manchester
1995	Goethe's Faust	Mephistopheles	RSC
1995	Julius Caesar	Mark Antony	RSC
2015	Othello	Othello	RSC
