= Tuesday's Child (Holby City) =

- Holby City episode
- Episode no.: Series 7 Episode 38
- Directed by: Simon Meyers
- Written by: Andrew Holden
- Cinematography by: Richard Dodd
- Original air date: 5 July 2005
- Running time: 60 minutes

Guest appearances
- Kwame O. Ansah as Manu Sembene; Irene Opare as Angela Sribor; Adrian Edmondson as Abra Durant; Prince Yawson as Mr Excitable; Danny Sapani as Kumi Griffin; Akofa Edjeani Asiedu as Joanna Myatt; Fali Asiedu as Louise Myatt; Danny Adeleye as Walter Zakhari; Sunday Godwin as Kojo Zakhari; Abigail Kubeka as Paulina Griffin; Fred Nii Amugi as Kwame Attakora; Gloria Acheampong as Esi Griffin; Kofi Falconer as Policeman; Reverend Ampaou Duku as Pastor

Episode chronology
← Previous "Rat Race"	Next → "Ostrich Mode"
- Holby City series 7

"Tuesday's Child" is the 38th episode of the seventh series of the British medical drama television series Holby City. The episode was written by Andrew Holden and directed by Simon Meyers, and premiered on BBC One on 5 July 2005. In "Tuesday's Child", registrar Diane Lloyd (Patricia Potter) travels to Ghana in an attempt to persuade consultant Ric Griffin (Hugh Quarshie) to return to Holby and save Holby City Hospital's general surgery ward. Ric deals with family issues, whilst trying to secure funding for his brother's clinic.

The episode was filmed entirely on location in Ghana as part of the BBC's "Africa Lives" season, exploring African culture for UK audiences. It was the second episode of Holby City filmed outside the UK, following a 2004 episode set in Paris. The serial continued to film one episode abroad annually until 2008, when BBC budget cuts curtailed further foreign filming. The Holby City crew spent five weeks in Elmina, using members of the local community in supporting roles. One crew member contracted malaria during filming, and several more were hospitalised. Both Quarshie and Potter expressed their pride at being part of the episode, with Quarshie deeming it his best work for the series. Adrian Edmondson guest-starred as surgeon Abra Durant, his first appearance in Holby City. He proved so popular in the role that he was asked to return twice more in 2005, and continued to make appearances in the series until December 2008.

The episode was watched by 7.27 million viewers. It was the second most-watched programme on BBC One for the week of broadcast, and the fourth most-watched show across all channels. The episode's premise received some criticism prior to broadcast, however the episode itself was generally well received by critics, and was praised by viewers in a 2006 report on the portrayal of Africa on British television.

== Plot ==
Registrar Diane Lloyd flies to Ghana, hoping to persuade consultant Ric Griffin to return to Holby and save Holby City Hospital's general surgery ward from being subsumed into an expanded cardiothoracic ward. She finds Ric at odds with his brother Kumi (Danny Sapani), who runs a clinic. Ric wants to perform free operations, but Kumi is desperate for money to keep the clinic running.

Diane appeals to Ric to return to Holby, for the sake of his pregnant daughter Jess as well as the hospital, but Ric insists that he is needed in Ghana, and tells Diane to go home. She talks to Ric's mother, Paulina (Abigail Kubeka), who reveals that Ric had a strained relationship with his father, and did not attend his funeral after twenty years of estrangement. She also meets Ric's friend Percy "Abra" Durant (Adrian Edmondson), who pries as to the nature of her relationship with Ric, and flirts with Diane.

Ric meets with an old school friend, Kwame Attakora (Fred Nii Amugi), now a successful local businessman. He attempts to persuade him to invest in the clinic, but Kwame, aware of Ric's family trouble in England, doubts his commitment. Ric is furious with Kumi for telling Kwame about his problems, but Kwame states that he could not deceive him, and that Ric does not understand Ghanaian honour. Without Kwame's support, the clinic goes bankrupt and Kumi chains the doors closed.

Travelling to the airport for her flight home, Diane and Ric come across a woman in labour, Joanna (Akofa Edjeani Asiedu), who is also suffering from malaria and having trouble breathing. It is unlikely she will survive a natural childbirth, and the nearest hospital is two hours away. They travel back to Kumi's clinic, collecting an inebriated Abra along the way. After Abra threatens to force entry, Kumi unchains the doors and they manage to deliver the baby and save Joanna.

As Diane has missed her flight, she suggests to Ric that they visit his father's grave. At the graveside, Ric tells Diane about his troubled relationship with his father, and confesses that he has feelings for her. They see a woman nearby who Diane recognises, having seen Paulina giving her money the day before. Ric confronts her, and discovers she is Esi Griffin (Gloria Acheampong), his father's last wife and widow. She has a son who is not in school, but will not explain her circumstances and tells Ric to speak to Kumi.

Ric confronts his brother about Esi, and Kumi tells him that their father died of AIDS, but the family kept it secret to avoid bringing shame on themselves. Because of her relationship with his father, Esi is also HIV positive. Ric confides in Diane, who attempts to kiss him, but Ric tells her to go home to her husband Owen. She asks him to return with her, but Ric says he must stay in Ghana. Abra takes Diane to Kwame, and she pleads with him on Ric's behalf. They go to the clinic, where Kwame tells Ric he will provide the required funding, on the condition that Ric stays in Ghana. Ric agrees, and bids Diane goodbye as she returns to Holby.

== Production ==
Holby City is regularly filmed at the BBC Elstree Centre in Borehamwood, Hertfordshire. In 2004, an episode was shot on location in Paris, and in March 2005, it was announced that an upcoming episode would be set in Ghana, as part of the BBC's "Africa lives" series, a week of programmes exploring African life and culture for UK audiences. The episode was shot entirely on location in Ghana, and was described by the BBC as "chang[ing] Ric and Diane's lives forever." The crew stayed in Elmina, and spent five weeks in Africa. During filming, one crew member contracted malaria, and three more were hospitalised with dehydration, diarrhoea and heat exhaustion. Until 2008, Holby City continued to film one episode abroad annually, with a 2006 episode set in Switzerland, a 2007 episode in Dubai and a 2008 episode in Cape Town. Series producer Diana Kyle stated in November 2008 that due to major BBC budget cuts, the series would not be filming abroad again for the "foreseeable future".

Potter and Quarshie are the only regular Holby City cast members who appear in the episode. Discussing Ric's motivations in "Tuesday's Child", Quarshie explained that his character was born there, and was "always meant to return at some point", leading to issues with his family. He expanded that in leaving Holby, Ric aimed to escape "the politics and stresses in his own life", stating: "It's somewhere he can recharge himself by getting back to uncomplicated medicine. The irony is, when he gets there, he realises there's no such thing, especially when you're constantly hustling to get funding for your clinic and struggling to find qualified doctors and nurses." Like his character, Quarshie is native to Ghana, though moved to the United Kingdom when he was three years old. His background had some influence on the episode's plot. While the end of the episode sees Ric choose to stay in Ghana, Quarshie remained in Holby City, with his character returning to the series soon thereafter. He explained that: "[Ric] has to stay in the country for the integrity of the episode, but for the integrity of the series, he must return." Quarshie deemed the episode the greatest work he had done for Holby City, and "one of the best episodes written", expressing his pride for it, and commending the BBC for the season of Africa-related programmes. Potter felt "honoured" to be part of the episode, deeming it a "privilege" to work on. She was concerned about her ability to work in the 120 °F Ghanaian heat, which she described as "like walking into an oven", but through the work of the series' make-up artists, was made to seem temperate on screen.

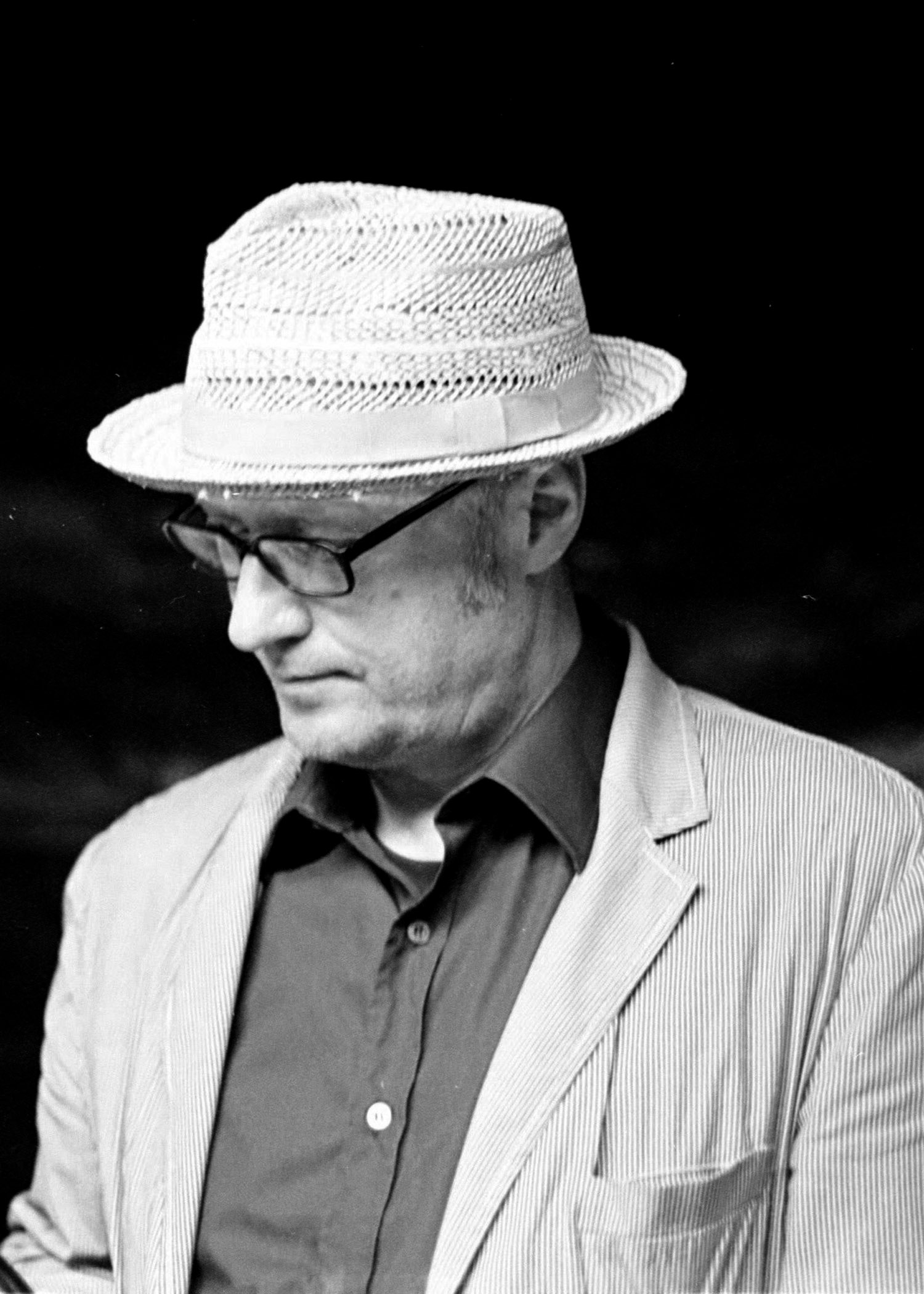
"Tuesday's Child" was Edmondson's first appearance as Abra Durant

Actor and comedian Adrian Edmondson guest-starred in the episode as surgeon Abra Durant, having been a fan of the show since its 1999 conception. His character proved so popular that Edmondson reprised the role twice in 2005, and signed a six-month contract in 2006, with series producer Emma Turner commenting that: "He made a huge impact in the few episodes that he was involved in." Edmondson returned to the series again in 2007, then 2008, making his final appearance in December 2008, when Abra returned to Ghana with Holby General nurse Kyla Tyson (Rakie Ayola). Edmondson ultimately departed from the series to pursue a full-time music career as part of the folk band The Bad Shepherds. He deemed the role of Abra a "dream", calling him a "great character", and characterising him as "a maverick [that] can do things the others would not be able to get away with."

Other guest-stars were cast locally. Ghanaian actors Kwame O. Ansah, David Dontoh and Akorfa Asiedu appeared in the episode, and a scene between Ric and Kwame involving a flotilla of boats featured real Elmina fisherman. Following the episode's completion, the Holby City production team in conjunction with the British High Commission gifted three flat-screen computers and a laser printer to the Elmina OLA Girls Boarding School. Simon Massey of the BBC stated that the people of Elmina had been "extremely supportive" and played a large role during filming, and that the donated equipment was a way of giving something back to the community.

== Reception ==
The episode was watched by 7.27 million viewers, up 310,000 on the previous episode, "Rat Race", and 230,000 higher than the series average of 7.04 million viewers. Holby City was the second most-watched programme on BBC One in the week of broadcast, with only the soap opera EastEnders attaining higher ratings. It was also the fourth most-watched show across all channels, behind EastEnders, and ITV1's Coronation Street and Emmerdale.

Prior to the episode's broadcast, John McKie of the Daily Record commented that in setting special editions of Holby City, Ground Force and Rolf on Art in Africa, BBC One controller Lorraine Heggessey was contradicting her desire to provide an alternative to negative coverage of the continent. The Western Mail criticised the build-up to the episode, writing that Holby City had abandoned its roots as a medical drama, concentrating instead on "wholly unbelievable" relationships between its main characters, with patient-care now incidental to inter-collegiate romances.

The episode itself received positive reviews. Television critic Jim Shelley of the Daily Mirror called it "mad but brilliant", and the Sunday Mercury selected the episode as recommended viewing. Sarah Moolla of The People praised the episode for strengthening her "growing belief that Holby is becoming by far the best medical drama on TV". She called Ric and Diane two of the series' "strongest and most likeable characters", commenting that with the addition of nurses Donna Jackson (Jaye Jacobs) and Mickie Hendrie (Kelly Adams), it could be turned into a spin-off series. Moolla felt that the episode could have been a "patronising Holby Goes Ghananas farce", like the Paris episode which she found "appalling [...] toe-curlingly bad", but instead deemed "Tuesday's Child" a "powerful, haunting and believable episode which you don't have to be a fan of the series to enjoy."

"Reflecting the Real World", a 2006 report examining the portrayal of Africa on British television, found that "Tuesday's Child" was one of the most popular programmes amongst those shown to viewers, alongside a Channel 4 documentary on AIDS and a BBC series following teachers and pupils in Uganda. Neera Dhingra of Voluntary Service Overseas (VSO), one of the organisations which commissioned the report, commented that, "The people who took part in our focus groups were very clear that they liked positive and transformative television, characters that they could relate to - basically good storytelling."
