= Stick or Twist =

Stick or Twist may refer to:

- "Stick or Twist", a 2005 episode of the British medical drama Holby City
- "Stick or Twist", a 2017 episode of the British medical drama Holby City
- "Stick or Twist", the first episode of British crime drama MobLand
