= Holby City series 7 =

Holby City
- Series 7
- No. of episodes: 52

Release
- Original network: BBC One
- Original release: 19 October 2004 – 11 October 2005

Series chronology
- ← Previous; Series 6 Next → Series 8

The seventh series of the British medical drama television series Holby City commenced airing in the United Kingdom on BBC One on 19 October 2004, and concluded on 11 October 2005.

== Cast ==
=== Main characters ===
- Kelly Adams as Mickie Hendrie
- Ian Aspinall as Mubbs Hussein (until episode 52)
- Adam Best as Matt Parker (from episode 29)
- Luisa Bradshaw-White as Lisa Fox (until episode 48)
- Sharon D. Clarke as Lola Griffin (from episode 34)
- Paul Henshall as Dean West (from episode 29)
- Tina Hobley as Chrissie Williams
- Noah Huntley as Will Curtis (until episode 25)
- Jaye Jacobs as Donna Jackson
- Verona Joseph as Jess Griffin
- Art Malik as Zubin Khan (until episode 51)
- Sharon Maughan as Tricia Williams
- Amanda Mealing as Connie Beauchamp
- Mark Moraghan as Owen Davis
- Patricia Potter as Diane Lloyd
- Robert Powell as Mark Williams (from episode 18)
- Hugh Quarshie as Ric Griffin
- Kim Vithana as Rosie Sattar (until episode 13)

=== Recurring characters ===
- David Bedella as Carlos Fashola (until episode 35)
- Ade Edmondson as Abra Durant (episodes 38 and 48)
- Martin Hancock as Reg Lund (from episode 37)
- Andrew Lewis as Paul Rose
- Alex Macqueen as Keith Greene (from episode 30)
- Chinna Wodu as Sean Thompson (episodes 6−43)

== Episodes ==
No. overall	No. in series	Title	Directed by	Written by	Original release date	Viewers (millions)
212	1	"Happy Families"	Nigel Douglas	Joe Ainsworth	19 October 2004	6.87
Baby Jack's custody trial today. Tricia goes for tests for her lump. Mickie gets mugged in an alley.
213	2	"Best Intentions"	Nigel Douglas	Debbie O'Malley & Martin Jameson	26 October 2004	6.33
Zubin is going to Paris for an interview and Jess tells him she loves him. Mickie and Lisa blame Donna for the mugging. Tricia finds out the tumor is malignant.
214	3	"Win Some, Lose Some"	Simon Massey	Andrew Holden	2 November 2004	7.50
Two of Will's patients die, and his family keep calling him. Jess follows Zubin to Paris. Ric and Donna are tasked with taking a patient to a Paris hospital for surgery. Donna has to keep Ric from finding out that Jess is there too.
215	4	"Braver Soul Than I"	Simon Massey	Adrian Pagan	9 November 2004	7.45
Tricia goes for her surgery, only to find out later that it is far more serious than she thought. Zubin takes the job in Paris, leaving Jess stunned. Ric gambles away the 5,000 he was paid for escorting the patient to Paris.
216	5	"One is the Loneliest Number"	Emma Bridgeman-Williams	Jeff Dodds	16 November 2004	7.83
Ric operates on Tricia and removes the entire breast. She is sent to Holby and everyone knows about it. Carlos can't cope with it and he dumps her. Another patient of Will's dies, he resigns, but Connie rips it up..
217	6	"A Sense of Guilt"	Emma Bridgeman-Williams	Paul Coates & Grant Watson	23 November 2004	7.51
Sean Thompson, Zubin's replacement starts today. Diane asks Owen to marry him. Connie and Will are getting on a lot better. Chrissie worries about a lump in her breast.
218	7	"Moment of Truth"	Simon Meyers	Debbie O'Malley	30 November 2004	6.94
Donna's birthday. Carlos tries to apologize to Tricia. Owen accepts Diane's proposal. During surgery for a chest problem, Mubbs discovers that Rosie is pregnant.
219	8	"Playing With Fire"	Simon Meyers	Colin Bytheway	7 December 2004	7.27
Mubbs tells Rosie that he does not want the baby. During the argument, Connie comes along and tells her that she and Mubbs slept together. Lisa blurts it to Chrissie that Owen and Diane are engaged.
220	9	"A Good Day to Bury Bad News"	Fraser MacDonald	Mark Holloway	14 December 2004	6.66
Jess gets tested for a STD that she blames Sean for. Tricia tells her friend Maggie her Cancer results and Connie is angry that Tricia has no authority to do so. Connie berates Lisa about having no control over her staff.
221	10	"Elf and Happiness"	Fraser MacDonald	Julia Wall	21 December 2004	6.56
Mubbs finds out his dad has cancer. Chrissie tells Mubbs mother that Rosie is pregnant. Rosie gives Mubbs one more chance to tell the truth and he fails again. Sean guesses that Jess is pregnant. The Christmas party.
222	11	"Casualty@Holby City (Part 2 of 2)"	Michael Offer	Johanne McAndrew	28 December 2004	8.82
Holby and Casualty casts unite for this special in which a tanker crashes into the hospital and explodes causing havoc.
223	12	"7 Days Later"	James Strong	Andrew Cornish	4 January 2005	8.09
Jess tries to tell Ric about the baby. Rosie wakes up with no recollection of the fire and Mubbs pretends they are still a couple. Jess has a scan and realizes the baby is Zubin's.
224	13	"Actions Speak Louder"	James Strong	Philip Gladwin	11 January 2005	7.76
The canteen is not at full capacity and Will complains to the kitchen staff. The staff go on strike. Will refuses to apologize and Connie suspends him. Rosie has an emergency Cesarean but the baby does not make it and she dumps Mubbs.
225	14	"Overload"	Olivia Lichtenstein	Jeff Povey	18 January 2005	7.46
Maggie passes away with Tricia by her side. Zubin is revealed as the new head of anesthetics and Connie makes will apologies to the striking canteen staff.
226	15	"War and Peace"	Olivia Lichtenstein	Jeff Dodds	25 January 2005	7.49
Jess tries to tell Zubin about the baby, but he praises her relationship with Sean. Micky and Mubbs have a date, but Donna butts in and takes them to a gay bar. Mubbs is furious and leaves.
227	16	"Live and Let Die"	Fraser MacDonald	Leslie Stewart	1 February 2005	7.12
Mubbs finds out that Mickie is gay and is angry. Jess breaks up with Sean and he kicks her out of the flat. She tells her dad about it and the pregnancy.
228	17	"Thin Ice"	Fraser MacDonald	Hugh Costello	8 February 2005	7.68
Zubin is back to run the new ITU. Owen sets the date for the wedding. Connie gives Mickie a chance to diagnose a patient. Zubin accidentally finds out that Jess is pregnant.
229	18	"Stick or Twist"	Rob Evans	Andrew Holden	15 February 2005	7.69
Chrissie seeks out her estranged father, who doesn't want to know her. Zubin almost tells Rick about his affair with Jess.
230	19	"Chain Reaction"	Rob Evans	Paul Coates	22 February 2005	7.81
Chrissie's father shows up at Holby. Lisa finds out that the Bailiffs took her possessions to pay Donna's debts. Grant Saunders, a convicted killer comes in for a heart transplant, then refuses it.
231	20	"Another Car Wreck"	Paul Kousoulides	Martin Jameson	1 March 2005	6.75
Connie hires Mark to help when they are short of nurses, and Tricia is fuming mad. Jess finally tells Sean he is not the father of the baby. Lisa puts Donna in charge to show her how hard it is
232	21	"Awakenings"	Shani S. Grewal	Ben Cooper	8 March 2005	6.21
Tricia wants Mark to go Chrissie wants him to stay. Shaun wants to know who the father of her baby is, but she won't tell him, and he offers to stand by her anyway. Connie makes Will mentor Mickie.
233	22	"Total Recall"	Shani S. Grewal	Adrian Pagan	15 March 2005	7.14
Owen's stag night does not go well. He kisses Chrissie, and Ric kisses Diane. Mark and Tricia won't work together. Jodie, from the bar ends up at Mickie's flat and they kiss. Diane invites Chrissie to the wedding.
234	23	"Love and Marriage"	Nick Copus	Debbie O'Malley	22 March 2005	7.55
Chrissie tries to prevent the wedding. Jodie collapses and is rushed to Holby. There is still tension between Mark and Tricia.
235	24	"Be Careful What You Wish For"	Nick Copus	Lilie Ferrari	29 March 2005	7.32
When Jess has a bleed and is taken to theatre, Zubin finds out that it is his baby. Will's past comes back to haunt him in the form of Jodie who was in his platoon. He is the one who botched her shrapnel surgery.
236	25	"Shock to the Heart"	Nigel Douglas	Len Collin	5 April 2005	6.93
After Jodie crashed the car into a scaffold, she ran away. Will and another man were impaled by the poles, and had to be rushed to surgery. Mickie finds out about this and reports Jodie for a hit and run. Connie operates on Will.: last Appearance of Will Curtic*
237	26	"The Honeymoon is Over"	Nigel Douglas	Joe Ainsworth	12 April 2005	7.23
Susan Curtis blames Connie for Will's post op death and demands an inquiry.
238	27	"It's Kinda Rock 'n' Roll"	Simon Meyers	Eric Deacon	19 April 2005	7.46
Zubin tries to put Sean off marrying Jess, but Sean realizes that Zubin must be the father of the baby. Sean then orders Zubin to stay away from Jess.
239	28	"Not Just a River in Egypt"	Simon Meyers	Jeff Dodds	26 April 2005	7.49
Ric finds out that Zubin is the father of Jess's baby, he is furious. Mark is late and Chrissie covers for him. Tricia tries to tell her that he is a big let down as a father and husband. A new consultant Dominic Fryer starts today.
240	29	"Damage Limitation"	Alice Troughton	Steven Handley	3 May 2005	6.22
Under Diane's knife, the new consultant Dominic dies. Two new student doctors (Parker and West) start in maternity today. They have history from when West left with Parkers love interest after a party.
241	30	"No Pain, No Gain"	Alice Troughton	John Milne	10 May 2005	6.59
Chrissie comes on to Owen at a charity event. Dominic's son confronts Zubin about his father's death and wants to know who is responsible for it.
242	31	"Losing Control"	Rob Evans	Mark Holloway	17 May 2005	6.78
Diane's pregnancy test is positive, but she can't tell Owen, she tells Ric. Mubbs is furious with Matt and Dean for womanizing on the job, and giving the patients too much information. Chrissie invites Owen for a drink.
243	32	"Something in the Air"	Rob Evans	Pete Hambly	24 May 2005	7.11
Zubin discovers there is nitrogen in the oxygen supply. He resents having Dr. Greene supervise him. Connie offers Diane a desk job because of her pregnancy. Diane thinks she may not want a baby just yet and Owen is shocked.
244	33	"Love, Life and Loss"	Steve Finn	Adrian Pagan	31 May 2005	6.78
Diane is overworked, and has a miscarriage. The board meets and decide that Zubin should be the fall guy for the death of Dominic . Jess decides to go back to Zubin and Ric cannot accept it.
245	34	"Patience"	Steve Finn	Clive Dawson	7 June 2005	7.16
Ric's ex wife Lola joins the Holby team as registrar and puts Connie in her place. Zubin has to face the board, but surprisingly, Ric defends him. Carlos Fashola the plastic surgeon is back. A car smashes into Zubin's car in the car park.: First Appearance of Lola Griffin*
246	35	"Pleasant Surprises"	Delyth Thomas	Simon J. Ashford	14 June 2005	6.94
Carlos arrives at the hospital with a patient and tries to make peace with Tricia. Mubbs' lifestyle catches up with him, and Connie announces her latest grand scheme.
247	36	"If it Ain't Broke"	Delyth Thomas	Joe Ainsworth	21 June 2005	6.40
Tricia prepares for her operation, only to discover it has been canceled. However, Carlos is on hand to make alternative arrangements - and a surprise declaration.
248	37	"Rat Race"	Nigel Douglas	Jeff Dodds	28 June 2005	6.96
Diane starts her new research job, but is frustrated to learn she can only treat patients in cases of emergency. Zubin asks Jess to move in with him.
249	38	"Tuesday's Child"	Simon Meyers & Hugh Quarshie	Andrew Holden	5 July 2005	7.27
In an episode filmed in Ghana, Diane goes in search of Ric to persuade him to return home - and discovers unresolved conflicts within his family. Adrian Edmondson guests
250	39	"Ostrich Mode"	Nigel Douglas	Eric Deacon	12 July 2005	6.68
Diane returns to Holby and asks Connie for her job back. Tricia develops an infection following her surgery, and Carlos asks her to come to America with him
251	40	"Home is Where the Hurt Is"	Karen Stowe	Stephanie Lloyd-Jones & Andrew Holden	19 July 2005	6.65
Ric and Zubin fight to save Jess in the operating theatre, and Dean tries to deter Donna from going on another date with Sean.
252	41	"Best Laid Plans"	Karen Stowe	Debbie O'Malley	26 July 2005	6.62
Connie's plans to start a cardiology centre meet with disaster when a patient of Ric's nearly dies, while Owen finds it difficult to communicate with his daughter.
253	42	"Soft Centered"	Alice Troughton	Jonathan Myerson	2 August 2005	6.49
Mickie makes an incorrect diagnosis that almost costs a patient her life. Owen fears he will never see Katy again, and Tricia discovers Mark has nowhere to stay.
254	43	"Dignity"	Alice Troughton	Peter Lloyd & Colin Steven	10 August 2005	4.01
Owen attends the hearing concerning access to his daughter, Mark celebrates his birthday while Chrissie prepares a surprise for him, and Jess struggles to cope with motherhood.
255	44	"The Innocents: Part I"	Rob Evans	Len Collin	16 August 2005	6.23
Frank is rushed to hospital with an aneurysm, and Kirsty tries to kiss Owen while he is treating her, only to run off when they are interrupted.
256	45	"The Innocents: Part II"	Rob Evans	Tony Lindsay	23 August 2005	6.92
Tricia takes desperate measures to prevent her secret getting out, and Kirsty stands by her allegations against Owen.
257	46	"Thinking Outside The Box"	Simon Meyers	Barry Simner	30 August 2005	7.14
Conflict erupts on the day of Frank's funeral as Mark loses his temper with Tricia, while Connie's efforts to hush up the cause of death are exposed.
258	47	"View from the Side Line"	Simon Meyers	Elsa Cranworth	6 September 2005	6.24
Tricia receives the results of the paternity test, Michael asks Lisa to resign, and Mubbs tries to charm Andy into giving him the consultant's job.
259	48	"Great Expectations"	Simon Massey	Martin Jameson	13 September 2005	7.18
Adrian Edmondson returns as Ric's colleague from Ghana, who performs a heart transplant on a patient Michael deemed ineligible. Mubbs asks Lisa to move in with him.
260	49	"Family Planning"	Simon Massey	Nic Ransome	20 September 2005	6.93
Mubbs allows Dean to treat a patient unsupervised, with disastrous consequences. Jess gets her exam results and tension brews between Ric and Lola. Mina Anwar guest stars.
261	50	"All the Perfumes of Arabia"	Steve Finn	Pete Hambly	27 September 2005	7.11
Jess finds herself at the centre of a baby-shaking scare after she rushes Paris to hospital and bruises are found on his body, while Michael is blackmailed.
262	51	"Days of Repentance"	Steve Finn	Chris Jury	4 October 2005	7.03
The hospital is hit by an infection, and Michael tries to blame Chrissie. Jess doubts her future with Zubin when he leaves Paris's funeral to answer an emergency call.
263	52	"Doing the Right Thing"	Nigel Douglas	Peter Jukes	11 October 2005	7.61
Chrissie attempts to expose the cover-up before she is blamed for the outbreak - and finds an unlikely ally. Mubbs and Dean face a disciplinary hearing.
