= David Atkins (actor) =

English actor

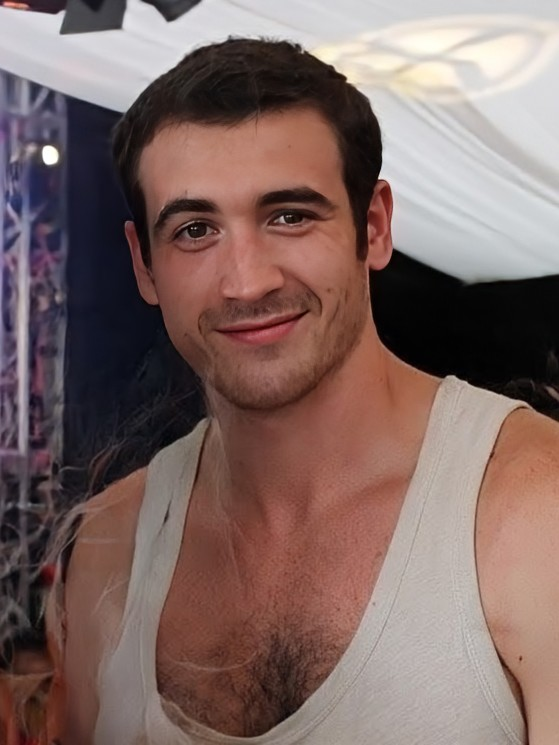
- Atkins in 2012
- Born: 6 July
- Occupation: Actor
- Years active: 2009–present

David Atkins is an English actor, known for his role as Rob Edwards in the Channel 4 soap opera Hollyoaks, who he played from 2011 to 2012. Atkins also appeared in two episodes of Doctor Who in 2010. In 2016, he was cast in the recurring role of Tyler Green, a young police constable, in the BBC daytime soap opera Doctors, which he played until February 2017.

== Career ==
Atkins played the role of Liam in The Street in 2009. He also appeared as Bob in the 2010 two-part Doctor Who episodes Time of Angels and Flesh and Stone. He played Josh in a short film called Thinking Straight (Previously Known as Girl Talk). He also appeared in three episodes of Shameless as Jimmy. On 5 September 2011, it was announced that the Channel 4 soap opera Hollyoaks would be introducing five new Freshers, with Atkins cast as Rob Edwards, a part which he played from September 2011 to February 2013. In October 2016, Atkins made his first appearance as PC Tyler Green in the BBC daytime soap opera Doctors, a young PC assigned to Rob Hollins (Chris Walker). His final appearance was in February 2017.

== Filmography ==
Year	Film	Role	Notes
2010	Thinking Straight	Josh	Short

Year	TV series	Role	Notes
2009	The Street	Liam Gargan	Episode #3.1
2010	Doctor Who	Bob	2 episodes: "The Time of Angels" and "Flesh and Stone"
2010	Shameless	Jimmy	3 episodes
2011–2013	Hollyoaks	Rob Edwards	Series regular
2016–2017	Doctors	Tyler Green	Recurring role
2017	Trust Me	Chris	1 episode
