= List of Doctors characters introduced in 2016 =

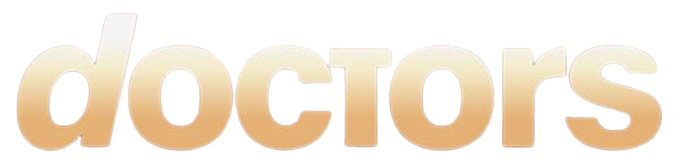
Doctors logo.

Doctors is a British medical soap opera which began broadcasting on BBC One on 26 March 2000. Set in the fictional West Midlands town of Letherbridge, the soap follows the lives of the staff and patients of the Mill Health Centre, a fictional NHS doctor's surgery, as well as its sister surgery located at a nearby university campus. The following is a list of characters that first appeared in Doctors in 2016, by order of first appearance. All characters are introduced by the programme's executive producer, Mike Hobson. Ricky Delaine (Neil Roberts) makes a guest appearance in February, while Ben Owens (James Daffern) is introduced in March as a short-term love interest for Niamh Donoghue (Jessica Regan). In April, couple Paul Cuthbert (Andy Moss) and Rhiannon Davis (Lucy-Jo Hudson) first appeared in April, as well as social worker Jane Fairweather (Patricia Potter). Police constable Tyler Green (David Atkins) debuted in October as a love interest for Ayesha Lee (Laura Rollins), followed by Lena Baker (Josephine Butler) in November as a love interest for Emma Reid (Dido Miles). Additionally, multiple other characters appear throughout the year.

== Ricky Delaine ==
Ricky Delaine, portrayed by Neil Roberts, appeared on 26 February 2016 and returned briefly in 2021. Ricky is a famous West End theatre performer. He visits the Mill Health Centre to see Valerie Pitman (Sarah Moyle), who runs his online fan-club, when she is suffering from cancer. Years later, he does a performance in Letherbridge. Valerie sneaks into his dressing room and the pair share a drink. Valerie asks if he has received her numerous letters, to which Ricky does not know anything about. He asks about her cancer, which she responds has gone away, despite recently having a throat cancer scare. Valerie assumes that Ricky is performing in Letherbridge as it is her 50th birthday; when he learns of her birthday, he calls her up on stage. Ricky dedicates a song to her and tells the crowd that she is an amazing woman. Ricky later calls her and asks Valerie to meet him in a hotel room. She arrives and begins stripping her clothes, but he informs her that he has asked her there for a job opportunity. He then asks if she would like to be his personal assistant. When he turns up at the Mill demanding Valerie to leave with him, she realises he is drunk and that he is trying to use her as a fling. She declines his offer and asks him to leave.

== Ben Owens ==
Ben Owens, portrayed by James Daffern, first appeared on 11 March 2016 and made his final appearance on 1 April 2016. Ben is introduced as a man choking at the Icon bar, and Dr. Niamh Donoghue (Jessica Regan) performs the Heimlich manoeuvre on him. After Ben stops choking, he asks Niamh for her phone number. He later calls her and asks her out on a date. While on the date, he reveals that his son Harry Owens (Cuchulainn Canning) has a systemic autoimmune condition that doctors are unable to diagnose, and that he shares care of Harry with his ex-wife Sarah Owens (Erin Shanagher). Ben takes Niamh to visit Harry in hospital, where he informs Niamh that the most likely outcome is his death, pleading her to look at viable treatment options. She finds an experimental treatment option in Switzerland, but due to his condition, doctors conclude that he is too ill to travel abroad. Niamh disagrees with the decision, and helps Ben, Harry and Sarah to get to Switzerland, where Harry responds well to the treatment.

== Paul Cuthbert ==
Paul Cuthbert
- Doctors character
- Portrayed by: Andy Moss
- First appearance: "Only Connect"; 14 April 2016
- Last appearance: "Hollow"; 10 June 2016
- Introduced by: Mike Hobson
In-universe information
- Sons: Nicholas

Paul Cuthbert, portrayed by Andy Moss, first appeared on 14 April 2016 and made his final appearance on 10 June 2016. Paul was introduced as the boyfriend of heavily pregnant Rhiannon Davies (Lucy-Jo Hudson). After it transpires that Rhiannon's firstborn child was taken by social services due to neglect, Paul accompanies Rhiannon to a hearing called to debate whether or not she can care for the unborn child. The consensus is that she can, and days later, she gives birth to a boy, Nicholas. Weeks later, his death is reported, and Paul refuses to take accountability for his death, and negates any claims of child abuse from him or Rhiannon. He is later told by Rob Hollins (Chris Walker) that Rhiannon is responsible for Nicholas' death after violently shaking him, and he is let go by the police.

Moss was travelling in India when producers of the soap devised a storyline for him; they asked to meet him a day after he landed back in the United Kingdom. Since he had done an episode of Doctors years ago, he initially assumed that he would not be interested in another guest stint. However, they explained that the stint as Paul would be longer, sent him some provisional scripts and told him that he would be working alongside Hudson. He met with them again a day later, where he was cast in the role. The casting of both Moss and Hudson was announced on 2 April 2016, with Digital Spy's Daniel Kilkelly writing that they would be part of a big storyline. Kilkelly noted that despite guest stars on Doctors usually appearing for one or two episodes, their story arc would be covered across several months. Producers also confirmed that their story "will take some dark turns".

Moss said that when viewers are introduced to Paul, "he seems like a lovely nice guy". Explaining his backstory, Moss said: "He's had quite a steady relationship with his girlfriend Rhiannon over the past year or so. Paul has been supporting her quite a lot, because she does have quite a past. They've come out the other side from that now and they're expecting their first child together. So it's a joyous story at first - but then it takes a very dark turn..." The actor said that neither he nor Hudson knew the outcome of the storyline. He explained that producers wanted his character to seem "happy-go-lucky" in his earlier scenes, while also having a "glint in his eye which hinted that something wasn't quite right". Moss also recalled that when himself and Hudson would read new scripts, their "jaws would hit the floor" in shock, adding that they "couldn't have even imagined" the culmination of events in their final episodes. Neither of the actors were given their final scripts until shortly before filming the scenes, which Hudson felt aided them. She said they "would have played it slightly different"; Moss echoed her statement, adding that it made the scenes feel "real".

== Rhiannon Davis ==
Rhiannon Davis
- Doctors character
- Portrayed by: Lucy-Jo Hudson
- First appearance: "Only Connect"; 14 April 2016
- Last appearance: "Hollow"; 10 June 2016
- Introduced by: Mike Hobson
In-universe information
- Sons: Nicholas

Rhiannon Davis, portrayed by Lucy-Jo Hudson, first appeared on 14 April 2016 and made her final appearance on 10 June 2016. Rhiannon was introduced alongside boyfriend Paul Cuthbert (Andy Moss); she is a heavily pregnant patient under the care of Dr. Emma Reid (Dido Miles). Rhiannon confides in Emma that it is not her first child since her firstborn was taken away by social services. It later transpires that Rhiannon was addicted to drugs, which led to the neglect of the child. When social services discover that she is pregnant, her rights to caring for the child are questioned, and there is eventually a hearing on whether she can or not, and the consensus is that Rhiannon can care for the child once it is born. Days after the hearing, Rhiannon goes into early labour, and gives birth to a boy, Nicholas. Weeks later, the death of Nicholas is reported to the police, and a post-mortem report reveals that he died after being repeatedly shaken by Rhiannon. When asked by sergeant Rob Hollins (Chris Walker), Rhiannon explains that Nicholas would not stop crying and that her stress led to her shaking him. She is subsequently charged with murder.

The casting of both Moss and Hudson was announced on 2 April 2016, with Digital Spy's Daniel Kilkelly writing that they would be part of a big storyline. Kilkelly noted that despite guest stars on Doctors usually appearing for one or two episodes, their story arc would be covered across several months. Producers also confirmed that their story "will take some dark turns". Explaining the couple's backstory, Moss said: "Paul has been supporting [Rhiannon] quite a lot, because she does have quite a past. They've come out the other side from that now and they're expecting their first child together. So it's a joyous story at first - but then it takes a very dark turn..." Moss also said that neither he nor Hudson knew the outcome of the storyline. He also recalled that when himself and Hudson would read new scripts, their "jaws would hit the floor" in shock, adding that they "couldn't have even imagined" the culmination of events in their final episodes. Neither of the actors were given their final scripts until shortly before filming the scenes, which Hudson felt aided them. She said they "would have played it slightly different"; Moss echoed her statement, adding that it made the scenes feel "real". Appearing on This Morning, Hudson said that she cried a lot while filming the sad scenes. She explained that as a mother, she was relating the events to her own children, which made it a hard role to play.

Hudson stated that despite appearing on Doctors for a short amount of time, she felt like "part of the furniture" and that her co-stars and the production team were "lovely". After scenes depicting Rhiannon having a breakdown and her eventual arrest were aired, numerous viewers voiced via social media that Hudson and Doctors itself "deserve awards" for the "emotional" storyline. A year later, for her portrayal of Rhiannon, Hudson won the award for Villain of the Year at the 2017 British Soap Awards. After winning the award, she stated that she was shocked to be nominated in the villain category, as Rhiannon is not "your stereotypical villain at all", and is rather a "depressive character". Hudson also felt that Rhiannon was a misunderstood character.

== Jane Fairweather ==
Jane Fairweather, portrayed by Patricia Potter, first appeared on 21 April 2016 and made her final appearance on 11 October 2017. Jane is a social worker that is introduced when Emma Reid (Dido Miles) enquires about Rhiannon Davis' (Lucy-Jo Hudson) history with her firstborn child. Jane informs her that Rhiannon had a drug addiction and that her neglect of her eight-month-old child led to the child having development issues. Jane arranges a hearing on whether or not Rhiannon should have rights to care for her upcoming child, of which the consensus is that she can. Jane disagrees with the result, and pledges to have the baby taken into foster care.

Jane is also involved with Karen (Jan Pearson) and Rob Hollins (Chris Walker), who want to become foster parents. Jane arranges an evening where potential foster parents can gather information about fostering, where she states that everybody must have rigorous background checks, involving health and other aspects of their lives. When Rob feels he is not ready to foster children, he visits Jane and informs her that Karen is too unwell to be a foster parent, due to having had amnesia. She later reveals this to Karen.

== Tyler Green ==
PC Tyler Green, portrayed by David Atkins, first appeared on 19 October 2016 and made his final appearance on 2 February 2017. Tyler is a police constable that begins working with Rob Hollins (Chris Walker). When he meets Ayesha Lee (Laura Rollins), he flirts with her, but she informs him that she is in a relationship with Seb Gooder (Miles Yekinni). When Ayesha is on a date with Seb, Tyler arrives, and the two try to outdo each other by impressing Ayesha. She chooses to further her relationship with Seb, but after seeing him angry, she begins to doubt her choice. However, when the pair go on numerous dates, their relationship develops. While on a shift, Tyler comes across Brenda (Andrea Gordon), the mother of Ayesha. Thinking Brenda would cause trouble for himself and Ayesha, Tyler begins to pay her to stay away from Ayesha. Bren later reveals this to Ayesha, and she has an argument with him. Ayesha then learns that Tyler has left Letherbridge and transferred to a different police station.

== Lena Baker ==
Lena Baker, portrayed by Josephine Butler, first appeared on 30 November 2016 and made her final appearance on 17 February 2020. Lena was introduced as a love interest for Emma Reid (Dido Miles), despite being married. She is also a friend to Valerie Pitman (Sarah Moyle), as the pair bond over both having cancer. Although Lena and Emma start as friends, they begin to develop romantic feelings for each other and begin an affair. However, once their affair is exposed to Lena's husband and family, they begin a public relationship. Over three years later, Lena surprises Emma when she comes to stay at her bed and breakfast with her new girlfriend. The pair catch up, and talk about their sexuality, which ends in Lena kissing Emma. After the kiss, they both affirm that it did not mean anything significant, and decide to move on.

== Other characters ==
Character	Episode date(s)	Actor	Circumstances
Debs Lee	2–4 February	Rebecca Carrie	One of Ayesha's (Laura Rollins) younger sisters. She arrives in Letherbridge and when the pair of them go to visit their addict mother, Brenda (Andrea Gordon), they find her drunk.
Harry Owens	21 March–1 April	Cuchulainn Canning	The son of Ben (James Daffern) who has a systemic autoimmune condition that doctors are unable to diagnose.
Sarah Owens	22 March–1 April	Erin Shanagher	The ex-wife of Ben (James Daffern) and the mother of Harry (Cuchulainn Canning).
Helena Wales	20 April	Jamelia	A woman who routinely has sex with rich businessmen in order to blackmail them into giving her money.
Seb Gooder	5 October–4 November	Miles Yekinni	A boxing instructor who flirts with Ayesha Lee (Laura Rollins). The pair kiss and arrange a date. While on a date with Ayesha, Tyler Green (David Atkins) shows up and competes with Seb for Ayesha's attention, and she later chooses him over Seb.
Rosie Griffiths	2 November 2016–30 January 2017	Natasha Cottriall	A woman that Jimmi Clay (Adrian Lewis Morgan) meets on a Vita course who develops an addiction to sleeping pills.
Max Bauman	22 November 2016–30 January 2017	Tom Wells	The boyfriend of Rosie Griffiths (Natasha Cottriall).
Adam Reynolds	6 December 2016–17 February 2017	Taro Bahar	A young carer who is put into the care of Karen (Jan Pearson) and Rob Hollins (Chris Walker) after being taken from his mother Jackie (Wanda Opalinska).
Jackie Reynolds	15 December 2016–16 February 2017	Wanda Opalinska	The mother of Adam (Taro Bahar). Adam cares for her due to her condition.
