= Diane Lloyd =

- Holby City character
- Patricia Potter as Diane Lloyd
- First appearance: "High Risk"; 2 July 2002
- Last appearance: "Promise"; 22 October 2019
- Portrayed by: Patricia Potter

In-universe information
- Occupation: Consultant surgeon (prev. Surgical registrar)
- Family: Carol Lloyd (mother); Oliver Lloyd (father); Joanna Lloyd (sister); Jack (nephew)
- Spouse: Owen Davis
- Significant others: Steve Waring; Ric Griffin; Danny Shaughnessy

Diane Lloyd is a fictional character from the BBC medical drama Holby City, played by actress Patricia Potter. She first appeared in the series four episode "High Risk", broadcast on 2 July 2002. Diane arrives at the hospital to work as a surgical registrar. She is characterised as an "ambitious" female determined to succeed in a "male-dominated world". She is portrayed as unlucky-in-love and has numerous failed relationships during her time on the show.

Writers paired Diane with healthcare assistant Danny Shaughnessy (Jeremy Edwards) but he is unfaithful. She terminates a pregnancy following the death of her lover, charge nurse Steve Waring (Peter de Jersey). Writers also created a romantic connection with consultant Ric Griffin (Hugh Quarshie), which lasted her entire duration. It was her relationship with consultant obstetrician Owen Davis (Mark Moraghan) that writers fully developed into marriage. This pairing was marred by the constant interference of Owen's former partner Chrissie Williams (Tina Hobley). Writers created a long running "love triangle" story between the characters which culminated in Owen being unfaithful and choosing to be with Chrissie.

Diane has also been featured in the special episode, "Tuesday's Child", which sees Diane travel to Ghana to convince Ric to return to Holby City hospital. Potter, Quarshie and the show's crew travelled to the Ghanaian city of Elmina, where they filmed the episode in sweltering heat. Writers also put Diane's career into jeopardy following two patient deaths which were investigated by the hospital board. The first being Dominic Fryer (Simon Dutton), who had previously sexually assaulted Diane. The second was a patient who died following a surgical error made by Nick Jordan (Michael French). Diane covers for him and is suspended for three months.

Potter decided to leave Holby City in 2007 and producers killed Diane off. She becomes down on her luck, quits her job and commits suicide by stopping her car on the railway track just as a train was passing. Her final appearance was in the episode titled "Past Imperfect", which was broadcast on 3 July 2007. In 2019, Potter agreed to reprise the role for a special episode to celebrate the show's 20th anniversary. Diane appears as a vision when Ric Griffin goes into cardiac arrest during brain surgery to remove a benign tumour. The character proved popular with television critics who chose her stories in their "pick of the day" features. Andrea Mullaney from The Scotsman named Diane of the show's best characters. The People's Sarah Moolla hailed her one of Holby City's "strongest and most likeable characters".

== Casting ==
The character and Potter's casting were publicised in June 2002. A reporter from Inside Soap revealed that Diane would arrive at Holby City hospital to work as a registrar. They added that she is an ex-lover of the established character Ric Griffin (Hugh Quarshie) and the last time they had seen each other, Ric had asked her to marry him. Of her casting, Potter said "it's a fantastic cast and crew, and everyone's really good friends." She made her first appearance in the episode titled "High Risk", which was broadcast on 2 July 2002.

== Development ==
=== Characterisation ===
"Diane's an ambitious woman who is determined to succeed in the male-dominated world of surgery. She takes her work very seriously but knows how to let her hair down after a trying day. She's had numerous flings within the department but is yet to meet Mr Right."

— An excerpt from Diane's profile on the official Holby City website.

A reporter from BBC Online said that "Diane was an ambitious woman determined to succeed in the male-dominated world of surgery. She was also a fragile, highly-strung soul unable to express her emotions well." Writers have portrayed Diane being very serious about her concentrating on her career and she is determined to prove herself in the hospital. A writer from What's on TV has described her medical skill set as being on par with the male doctors. She is ambitious and her dedication to the role annoys other staff - but she is not afraid to have fun. The character has often been portrayed as keen to find love with various failed relationships.

Potter said that Diane "tries so hard to be professional all the time" but this often leaves her "wound up and emotional". When Diane reaches her thirtieth birthday, she decides that she should try and settle down. But Potter warned that "she doesn't know how to handle relationships very well." The actress also believed she was "much older and wiser" than the unlucky-in-love Diane.

=== Failed relationships ===
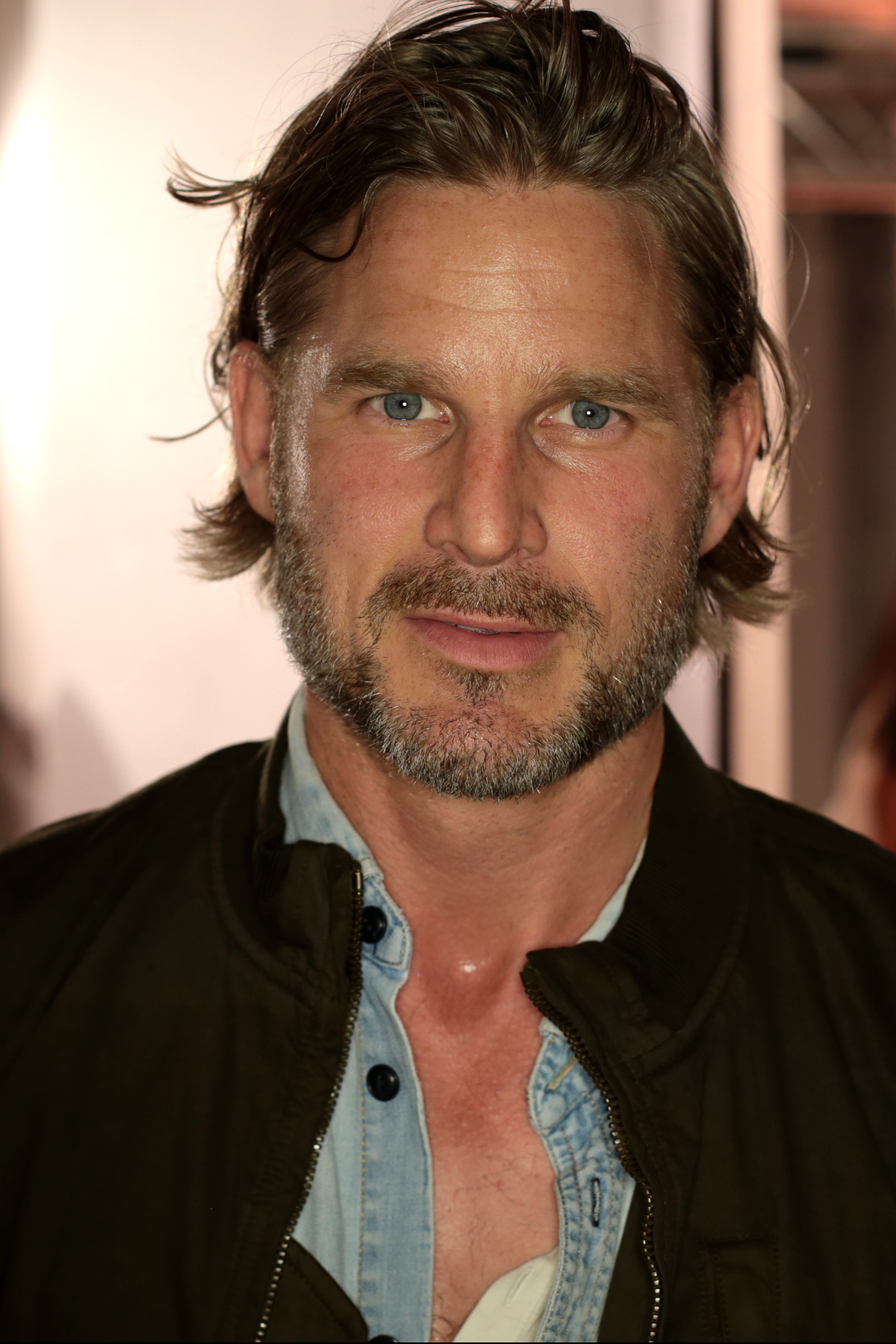
Noah Huntley played surgeon Will Curtis. He shared a romantic connection with Diane but Holby City writers did not develop it further.

Writers paired Diane with healthcare assistant Danny Shaughnessy (Jeremy Edwards) soon after her introduction. He creates problems between them by bragging to midwife Lisa Fox (Luisa Bradshaw-White) that Diane will do whatever he asks of her. Diane overhears the exchange and is upset, which Danny worsens by flirting with a patient. Writers carried on creating more arguments between Diane and Danny. When the hospital staff accuse a relative, Matt Bradshaw (Dominic Rickhards) of domestically abusing his wife, he directs his anger towards Diane and hits her. Danny fails to remain professional and attacks Matt. Diane is angry with Danny's violent outburst and questions whether she wants to continue their relationship. Their romance ends just weeks later when she catches Danny and Lisa having sex.

Producers then paired Diane with charge nurse Steve Waring (Peter de Jersey) for her second relationship story. Diane thinks she is pregnant and goes to registrar Mubbs Hussein (Ian Aspinall) for an ultrasound scan to confirm it. Diane's reaction is to ask for a termination and she is upset so decides to confide in Ric. He informs his daughter Jess Griffin (Verona Joseph) who has previously had an abortion and she offers Diane advice. She then goes ahead with the termination.

In July 2003, Potter said that it was her favourite storyline because it allowed the chance to portray Diane's differing personality. She described Steve's departure as "terribly sad" with "the added trauma of the abortion", which showed her "vulnerability - she's usually very strong - and I enjoyed having a good cry."

Diane is included in a storyline which helps introduce the surgeon Will Curtis (Noah Huntley). His debut episode takes place at an army base which was filmed on location at woodlands in Watford. There were ten night shoots in cold weather and snow. Potter enjoyed the experience because it was funny to film and added that she looked "foul in combats". Diane and Will share some close moments but Potter warned that he turns out to be unsuitable for Diane. In the episode, which is titled "In The Line of Fire", Diane goes to a field hospital where she trains Will on trauma techniques. A soldier dies while an participating in an exchange of friendly fire. This has a negative effect on their day but they agree that they work well together. Diane then thinks she will not see Will again so asks him out on a date. She is disappointed when he declines the offer. But the pair do have an "obvious attraction" to each other. Will arrives at Holby City hospital to take a job as a registrar. Diane is surprised to see him and realises that their attraction was not real. Huntley told Claire Brand from Inside Soap that "the spark between them isn't so obvious when they meet again."

Diane's stories often feature consultant Ric Griffin and Potter enjoyed working with Quarshie on a regular basis. When Diane was introduced into the show it was revealed she is Ric's ex-girlfriend. The actress told a reporter from BBC Online that "I'd love Diane and Ric to end up as a bickering old married couple."

Ric and Diane would have an on-off relationship lasting her entire duration of the show. The pair rekindle their romance during a trip to Ghana (see below). In March 2007, producers ended their partnership for good. Ric returns following an extended break from the hospital, which causes Diane to talk about him. She states that Ric has never inspired her which Ric overhears. Quarshie told a reporter from Metro that "it’s not exactly the welcome he was expecting." So Ric decides to get revenge by introducing Diane to his new fiancée Thandie Abebe (Ginny Holder), knowing that the former still loves him. Quarshie added that "Diane tries to apologise for her outburst, but she meets Thandie and is speechless." This exchange is "the final nail in the coffin" for their on-off relationship.

=== Marriage to Owen Davis ===
"They're not really made for each other, their relationship has never been normal. They only ended up together after Diane lost her sister and had to care for a newborn baby on her own. Within a month of getting together, they had this little family, and suddenly they were on a roller-coaster ride to marriage. Owen is a good person and he is trying to do the right thing, but in his heart it isn't really what he wants. It will all end in tragedy!"

— Patricia Potter discussing Diane and Owen's doomed relationship. (2005)

Diane's relationship with consultant obstetrician Owen Davis (Mark Moraghan) began in 2005. Potter initially thought that Diane and Owen were well suited to each other. She told Alex Tate from The People that explained "Owen is the real Lothario type who isn't too keen on commitment and Diane backs off when any relationship gets serious, so they work quite well together." When Diane's pregnant sister Joanna Lloyd (Hannah Bourne) is involved in a car accident she is rushed to hospital. Diane is angry because Joanna did not wear her seatbelt while driving and accuses her of being a bad mother. Following their argument Joanna's condition deteriorates and she is taken into intensive care. When she is rushed into an operating theater, surgeons fail to save Joanna but they do manage to deliver her baby Jack safely. Joanna's ex-boyfriend Simon Parker (Stuart Laing) tells Diane that he does not want to look after Jack and he is now Diane's responsibility. She is shocked and has to consider her career commitments.

Diane decides to take care of the baby. Potter said that this forces Diane and Owen to "reassess everything" because she feels that she cannot concentrate on him too. This leaves Owen with the task of convincing her otherwise. Potter concluded "she's got to juggle being a surgeon and a mum, so it's up to Owen whether he wants a ready-made family." Diane finds it difficult to carry on working and look after Jack. Her boss Connie Beauchamp (Amanda Mealing) begins to pressurise her into progressing faster in her hospital role and put her career first. Writers began to include Owen's ex-wife, ward sister Chrissie Williams (Tina Hobley) in the story. As Nicola Methven and Polly Hudson from the Daily Mirror noted, Owen and Chrissie had a five-year relationship with constant reconciliation. Chrissie is jealous when she notices that Owen is investing his time in Diane and Jack's life. When Owen offers Diane parenting advice, she tells him to mind his own business. But she soon reconsiders when Simon issues a court summons wanting to regain custody of Jack.

Diane struggles with the possibility of losing Jack. She tells Owen that they must spend more time with Jack, prior to the hearing. This prompts Owen to change his priorities, asking Diane to marry him and move into his home. She accepts and Chrissie is angry that Owen has set up a home with Diane and baby Jack. She feels more upset because their baby died. Moraghan told an Inside Soap reporter that "Owen does love Diane and he is just desperate to have a family and settle down." Other characters make comparisons between Owen's relationships with both Diane and Chrissie, believing he is replacing his deceased child. But Moraghan believed that Owen thinks that his relationship with Chrissie was over for good.

Chrissie does not think the same and begins to romantically pursue Owen. Moraghan explained that Chrissie is "funny like that" and "wants what she cannot have". He concluded that Owen wants Diane but warned that she "is always going to be looking over his shoulder" with Chrissie waiting for Owen. In the following episodes they lose the custody battle and Simon goes to their home to take Jack away. Diane goes to work as normal but soon break down and blames Owen for losing the custody battle. Writers developed even more problems for the couple by introducing Owen's daughter Katie Davis (Anna Diski). She tells Diane that her impending marriage to Owen will not last.

Writers created a dramatic build up to the wedding episode. It was reported that their hen and stag party turns into a "disaster" when they have their parties in the same bar. Diane gets drunk and Ric escorts her home safely. Left alone with Chrissie, Owen ends up kissing Chrissie and goes to her home to have sex with her. Hobley told Lynne Michelle from the Sunday Mirror that Chrissie's motive for snaring Owen from Diane is because she can see he has moved on with his life. Hobley added that "Chrissie is very scheming and she plots the whole thing. They end up having sex, she thinks Owen is making a terrible mistake marrying Diane, and tries to get him back." But the actress believed that it was actually too late for Chrissie and Owen because of their dramatic history.

Diane is also unfaithful after an emotional chat with Ric leads to a kiss. The following episode centres around Diane and Owen's wedding. Potter told Inside Soap's Brand that "Diane is mortified about what happened with Ric. Diane and Ric do have feelings for each other but "as far as she's concerned" it is platonic. The character decides that she "certain about going ahead with the wedding". Diane has no idea that Owen has spent the entire eve of their wedding in bed with Chrissie. Potter explained that Diane would probably "freak out" but she is so "oblivious to it all". Potter added that Diane has never trusted Chrissie, who is brazen enough to help Diane to get dressed for her wedding. Potter added that the scene made viewers believe Chrissie would tell her about the affair - but Chrissie manages to lie. Owen arrives at the ceremony and the wedding goes ahead as planned. Potter believed that Diane and Owen's relationship would not last. She added that "they're not really made for each other" and that "it will all end in tragedy." The wedding was filmed over a two-day period and Potter thought that Diane's wedding dress was uncomfortable. Her boyfriend also visited her on-set and she ran up to him wearing the dress. She described the experience as "all very weird".

In May 2005, an Inside Soap article detailed the remarks of an Holby City publicist calling the plot a long-running "love triangle" story, which would continue into the British Summer months. When Diane and Owen return from their honeymoon, Chrissie demands that Owen tells his wife about their affair. Chrissie resumes her plan to snare Owen when they both go to Michael Beauchamp's (Anthony Calf) charity ball. She gets drunk and takes Owen outside for a kiss. She then tries to convince him to go back to her house but he refuses. Writers made the story more complicated by introducing a pregnancy with Diane being the expectant mother. She has no idea that Chrissie's scheming is beginning to work, as she even convinces Owen that he does not love his wife.

Owen and Chrissie's affair gained momentum after Diane suffers a miscarriage. Owen is excited when Diane receives a job promotion and he heads home to celebrate with her. Chrissie chases after Owen and confronts him, telling him that he does not love Diane and is avoiding their inevitable break-up. Writers conjured up a conclusion for the story, which played out during Holby City's December 2005 broadcasts. Chrissie tells Owen that she is leaving but he remains firm in his commitment to his marriage. Owen later has a violent outburst with a patient and a complaint is made. Diane vows to stand by Owen through any inquiry, but this prompts Owen to realise he must be truthful. He tells Diane that he has had an affair with Chrissie and will be getting back together with her. Owen was soon written out of Holby City and Diane and Chrissie clash in subsequent episodes. Diane acts unprofessionally when she and Chrissie nearly have an argument in front of a patient. A reporter from Inside Soap stated that Diane is heartbroken by Owen's departure but then has to deal with the reopening of Keller ward.

=== Ghana episode ===
Diane was featured in a special episode of Holby City titled "Tuesday's Child" which was broadcast on 5 July 2005. The episode was commissioned as part of the BBC's "Africa lives" series, a week of programmes exploring African life and culture for UK audiences. Potter felt "honoured" to be part of the episode, deeming it a "privilege" to work on. She travelled to Elmina, Ghana to film the episode during a five-week location shoot. She stayed in a hotel but got to know local families and how they lived. Members of the crew became ill, but Potter managed to complete filming unharmed, despite high temperatures. Potter and her colleagues would film daily until 4PM and return to their hotel for the night. The heat was a problem on the set and their make-up team were powdering actors faces and spraying them with water between scenes. Potter told Steve Hendry from the Sunday Mail that "it looks like it could have been quite temperate which is a little disappointing after so much suffering and pain. It was like stepping into an oven."

The episode features Diane travelling to Ghana to locate Ric and attempt to convince him to return to Holby City. Ric was in Ghana generating funds for his brother's new clinic. With Holby City hospital facing closure Diane needs Ric's help to save their workplace. A BBC reporter stated that the episode is "a story that will change Ric and Diane's lives forever." They added that Diane is in an emotional state when she goes to Ghana following marriage problems with Owen. While their she faces "facing unexpected emotions" and feelings for Ric. The episode culminates with Diane admitting she has romantic feelings for Ric and kissing him, before returning home. Quarshie told a reporter from Inside Soap that Diane's arrival caused Ric to question his life choices. He concluded that Ric "realises what he loved about her all along, and there is a rekindling of that affection."

=== Nick Jordan's manipulation ===
In April 2006, it was reported that Diane's colleague Nick Jordan (Michael French) would begin a campaign of manipulation against Diane. Nick wants to change everyone's opinion of him and thinks that seducing Diane will get other staff on his side. An Inside Soap journalist revealed that the "ambitious surgeon" would "stop at nothing" to get what he wants. When Diane begins to struggle with research projects and carrying out clinical duties, Nick offers to help. When they work well together during an operation, Nick asks Diane out for a date, which she declines. They added that Nick manages to manipulate her into reconsidering with his "charm".

Diane covers for Nick when a patient dies as a result of a medical error in the operating theatre. Diane's silence brings her role in the operation into question and she is blamed for the death. The future of Diane's career is placed in-front of the hospital board and they suspend her. Potter told Graham Kibble-White from The News Letter the story was rewarding to play. She explained that Holby City is always dramatic but this story "was more specific than that [...] it was really nice to have a plot that was less hysterical than usual." Potter added that Diane made a "terrible mistake" in covering for "self-serving" Nick. He thinks he can evade justice "even though it means sacrificing her. So it looks like the poor love is going to end up taking the rap for him."

Diane becomes stressed with Nick and slaps him for not telling the truth. The actress worried the scene was making it "very melodramatic" because colleagues do not usually attack each other at work. The writers put Potter at ease, and she explained that "I was a little concerned that was going to be a bit on the soapy side of things. But actually the script was very good." The result of the storyline meant that Potter was able to take a three-month sabbatical from the show while Diane was off-screen.

=== Departure and suicide ===
Potter first discussed her thoughts about leaving Holby City in May 2006, when she took her three-month sabbatical. On 21 October 2006, Potter announced her decision to leave Holby City in order to pursue other acting roles. She said that "I've had some fantastic storylines, but after five years on the show I felt it was time to move on to other projects." A BBC publicist revealed that the character would leave the following year and be featured in "dramatic storylines until her departure."

In the build up to her departure writers conjured up a series of bad experiences to make Diane down on her luck. This included having her car stolen, being accused of racism and the hospital board deciding she cannot operate without the supervision of surgeon Jac Naylor (Rosie Marcel). It was revealed prior to her final episode that she would be killed off. A Holby City publicist told Polly Hudson from the Daily Mirror that "it's all very sad. Diane dies in an accident. Or is it an accident?" During her final episode Diane hands in her resignation from the hospital and Elliot Hope (Paul Bradley) convinces her to take a break at his country cottage, even lending her his wife's car. Diane is killed when her car collides with a train, which was ruled as a suicide.

Ric struggles in the aftermath of Diane's death and his fiancée Thandie becomes concerned. She accuses him of still being in love with Diane and he does not deny it. She break-up with Ric who then goes to say his final goodbye to Diane in the chapel of rest. In 2019, Quarshie said that Ric viewing Diane's body was the saddest scene he had ever filmed on the show. Potter's final credited episode was "Past Imperfect", which featured Diane's funeral and was broadcast on 3 July 2007.

=== Other stories ===
In one story, writers explored Diane's back story which reveals she was sexually assaulted by Dominic Fryer (Simon Dutton). Producers introduced Dominic as a teaching consultant who trains new colleagues at the hospital. Dominic's trainee Emma Ridgeon (Amy Searles) attacks him and he collapses and is taken to an operating theater. They discover that he has a hernia and he opts to remain awake for the procedure. Emma is found collapsed in the toilet after taking an overdose. She claims that Dominic has forced himself on her. During Dominic's operation, Diane behaves unprofessionally and starts an argument with him. Their bickering results in the operation going wrong and his condition deteriorates. A reporter from Inside Soap revealed that Diane would be investigated over the incident. They added that she would be "left to answer some very awkward questions concerning how such a routine procedure could go so wrong." Dominic dies as a result and an inquest into his death is opened.

Diane has appeared in the spin-off show Casualty@Holby City. In the story she fights to save the life of paramedic Comfort Jones (Martina Laird).

=== Return ===
In July 2019, it was announced that Potter had agreed to reprise the role of Diane to celebrate the show's twentieth anniversary. Writers created a special episode that allowed the character to return despite being killed off. Of her return Potter stated "revisiting Diane feels like putting on an old glove! She had a tragic end and this storyline feels like it puts the character to bed with some peace and resolution. It's great."

Holby City's executive producer Simon Harper said that bringing back a dead character was a rare occurrence on the show and noted that she would not be back from the dead. He added "her return is in itself an anniversary homage to a time on the show when we experimented quite regularly with genre and style, so the audience can expect something very different indeed in a unique and quirky episode where Ric faces a terrifying and life-changing choice."

== Reception ==
For her portrayal of Diane, Potter was nominated for "Best Actress" in the BBC's "Best of 2004" awards. Diane's storylines have been chosen in tabloid journalism "pick of the day" features numerous times. A reporter from the Coventry Evening Telegraph chose the episode featuring Diane being blamed for the death of a patient. A Daily Record writer included Diane discovering that is being blamed for a surgical error caused by Nick. They also included the subsequent episode in which Diane attempts to prove her innocence. A Liverpool Echo journalist picked the aftermath of Diane's death.

In one story Diane secures the role of locum consultant which Jac Naylor also applies for. A writer from the Liverpool Echo said that "Diane and Jac's working relationship hasn't exactly been an easy one to date, and it doesn't look as if it's going to improve". They believed that Jac was her rival who took credit for her work. A columnist from Inside Soap covered Diane and Jac's arguments over patient care. They quipped that it was "war of the wards" and "battle lines" were drawn between the rivals. The Daily Mirror's Jane Simon was not optimistic about Diane securing the job that Jac had also applied for. She observed that Jac was prepared to "climb all over" Diane who "really doesn't have much luck working with other women."

Simon praised insults Owen's daughter Katie made towards Diane, agreeing that Chrissie was better looking and "drippy Diane's" marriage would not last. She added "that's one of the best on-the-spot diagnoses Holby's managed in ages. Give the kid her own department." The critic has also sympathised with Diane's dislike of Owen's ex-lovers. She branded Diane a "dozy cow" because she was not more concerned about disliking at Chrissie. Claire Brand from Inside Soap branded Diane and Owen "Holby's mismatched couple". Louise Hancock from the Sunday Mirror hailed the character as "sexy registrar Diane Lloyd". A reporter from the Liverpool Daily Post called her "a new, attractive and rather familiar figure." The People's Sarah Moolla believed that Diane was one of Holby City's "strongest and most likeable characters".

Andrea Mullaney writing for The Scotsman praised Diane and the lead up to her departure. Mullaney opined that she was "one of the best characters in the hospital soap" and has "maverick surgical ways". She added that "a fairly convincing story" had been created in the weeks prior to her death, where she gradually became disillusioned, isolated and fed up. But the critic bemoaned her death as "a rubbish shock ending". She thought that "it was an infuriating way to write her out - either give her the fresh start exit or a juicy death scene - and it felt as if the programme was trying to have its cake and eat it." Reviewing the episode in which Diane died, a Birmingham Mail critic said that there is "never a dull moment" in "one of the most disaster-prone regions in TV land." Nicola Methven and Polly Hudson from the Daily Mirror said that Diane left the series "in spectacular style".

A Western Mail named Diane as one of the Holby City characters that put their personal lives before the welfare of patients. He also ridiculed Diane's reliance on Ric during a time of crisis. Rachel Mainwaring of Wales on Sunday questioned the plausibility of Diane and Jess going off-site to stop Alex from killing himself when the hospital was understaffed and overcrowded. Jim Shelley writing for the Daily Mirror criticised a dialogue mistake during a scene featuring Diane requesting an ambulance and oxygen whilst being stuck in remote Ghana. He jibed "she may not be cut out for life as an African medic after all." A The Herald journalist said that Nick was a "rotten cad" for his treatment of Diane. They concluded that Diane choosing Nick over Ric was "enough to make you sick".
