= Patricia Potter =

English actress (born 1975)

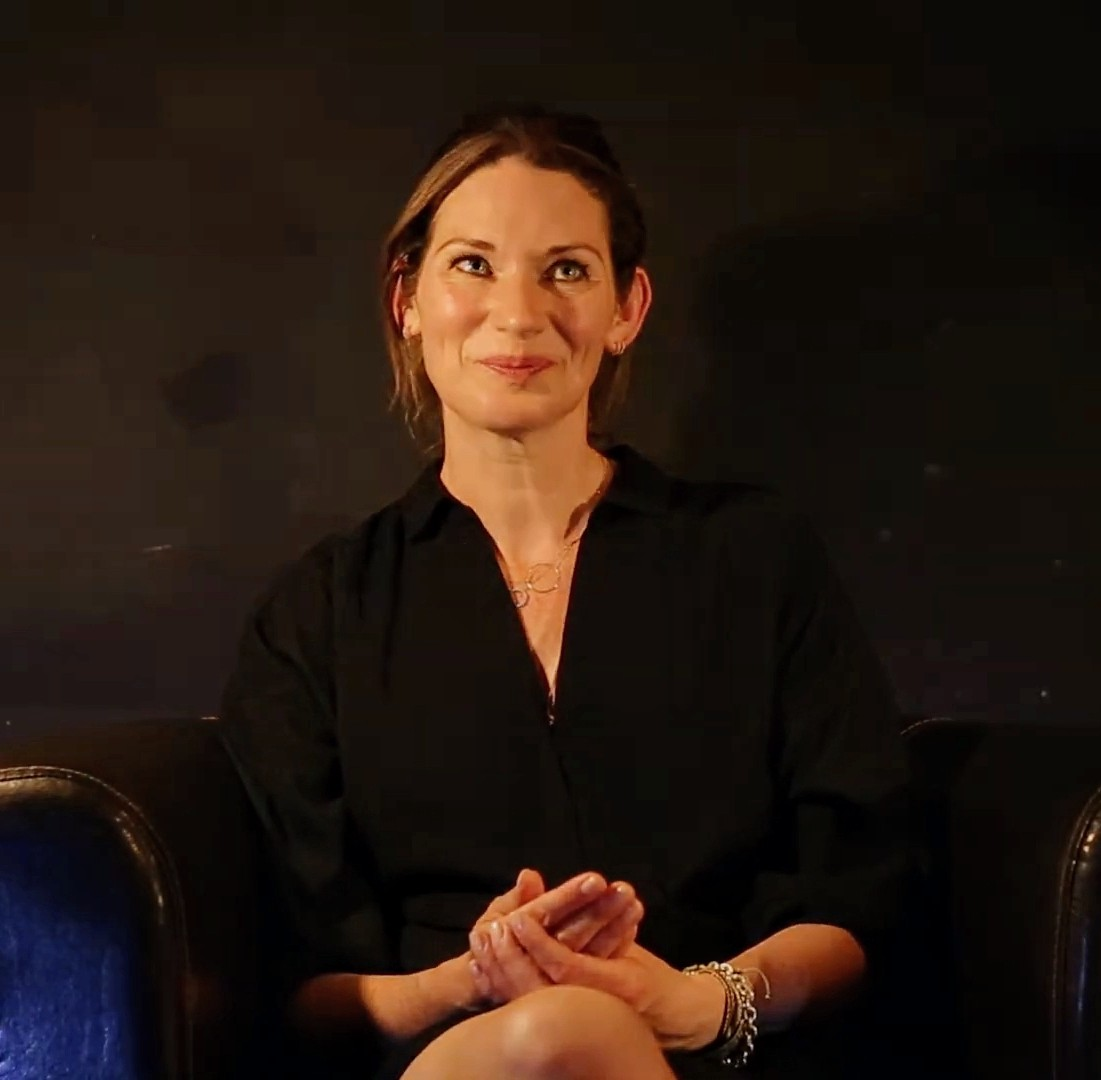
- Born: 3 March 1975 (age 51); England
- Occupation: Actress
- Spouse: Jim Down
- Children: 2

Patricia Caroline Potter (born 3 March 1975) is an English actress, known for her role as Diane Lloyd in the BBC medical drama series Holby City. From 2016 to 2017, she appeared in the BBC soap opera Doctors as Jane Fairweather. In 2026, she joined the cast of the BBC soap opera EastEnders as Gemma Hawkins.

== Personal life ==
Potter grew up on a farm in Kent with her father, David, her mother, Viv, and her sister, Kate. She refers to her parents as "the most hard-working, generous and genuine people I know." Discussing her decision to become an actress, she has stated that "It was the only thing I was ever any good at school and I was lucky enough to have a very encouraging teacher." A graduate of the London Academy of Music and Dramatic Art, Potter married her partner Jim Down, an intensive care consultant and anaesthetist, on 19 May 2007. In 2006, Potter ran the Flora London Marathon for the Anthony Nolan Trust in 4:53:54, raising over £3,000 for the charity. She said of the experience: "That was my first and my last marathon, I admire anyone who does these runs on a regular basis. It's been very difficult to train with the work schedule at Holby and so again, I do appreciate the hard work that goes in to the marathon." She sang "Can't Help Loving That Man of Mine" and "The Way You Look Tonight" at co-star Tina Hobley's wedding in December 2006.

In early October 2009, Potter gave birth to twins, a boy and a girl.

== Career ==
On stage, Potter has appeared in theatrical versions of The Duchess of Malfi, Much Ado About Nothing, and Happy End. Her first television role came in 1997, when she played a florist in the third series of ITV drama Soldier Soldier. Potter has also appeared in The Bill, Brookside and the Scarlet Pimpernel, as well as the film Shakespeare in Love. She played herself in Ricky Gervais's comedy Extras as an ex-girlfriend of Gervais' character Andy Millman. She said of the role: "It was quite frightening leaving the security of the Holby environment which I know so well and going onto a new set but it was a fantastic experience which I thoroughly enjoyed."

Potter's most notable role to date was that of Diane Lloyd in BBC medical drama series Holby City. While researching for the Casualty spin off, she witnessed open heart surgery to enhance her role as a medical employee, deeming the experience "fascinating", and stating: "I think I'd have made a good surgeon in real life as I'm very careful and fussy about making my stitches perfect!" On her favourite storyline in the show, she has explained: "Although it was terribly sad, I really enjoyed Steve's departure from the show – the added trauma of the abortion and Diane's relationship with Steve meant that Diane showed some vulnerability – she's usually very strong – and I enjoyed having a good cry. It was also great to be involved in Alex's Parkinson storyline." Of her former cast members, Potter has said: "Everyone is fun to work with here – we're all really lucky to be amongst such lovely people. I work most regularly with Hugh Quarshie who is brilliant so I'm extra lucky." In October 2006, Potter announced her intention to leave the show after four years. "I have really enjoyed and am still enjoying my time on Holby, I've had some fantastic storylines, but after 4 years on the show I felt it was time to move on to other projects. I wanted to move before I became too complacent. You have to weigh up if it's worth leaving a job that you really enjoy to face the unknown".

After leaving Holby City, Potter appeared in BBC One sitcom Jam and Jerusalem, before returning to theatre with the play An Eligible Man. She said of the transition: "I'm in a strange state somewhere between excitement and terror! It's been a long time since I was last on stage so I was worried that I would find it difficult and frightening but actually it's been great fun and I've thoroughly enjoyed the rehearsal process. We had our first preview last night which was quite an adrenaline rush!" Then from 2016 to 2017, she appeared in the BBC soap opera Doctors as Jane Fairweather. In 2023 she appeared as Oonagh Wallace in Vera (S12, Ep 1)

In 2026, Potter was announced to be joining the cast of the BBC soap opera EastEnders as Gemma Hawkins, the sister of Nicola Mitchell (Laura Doddington), arriving alongside several other members of the Hawkins family.

== Filmography ==
Potter undertook the following roles from her screen and televisual debut in 1993, to the present day.

Year	Title	Role	Other notes
1997	Soldier Soldier	Florist	Episode "Out"
1998	Shakespeare in Love	Third whore	
1999	The Scarlet Pimpernel	Angele St. Cyr	
1999	The Bill	Claudia	Episode "Sleeping with the Enemy"
1999	Trial and Retribution III	Emily	
1999	Brookside	Victoria Seagram Wilcox	To 2001
2002–2007, 2019	Holby City	Diane Lloyd	Series regular
2005	The Wright Stuff	Panelist	
2006	Children in Need	Diane Lloyd	
2006	Extras	Andy's Old Flame	Series 2, episode 4
2008	Jam and Jerusalem	Amy	Series 2, episode 6
2012	Absolutely Fabulous	Royal Albert Hall Manager	Series 6, episode 2
2012	DCI Banks	Pamela Jefferies	Series 2, episodes 3 & 4
2013	Frankie	Orla Maguire	Episode 5
2013	Man Down	Dennis's Mum	Series 1, episode 5
2014	New Tricks	Bryony Willis	Season 11, Episode 3
2015	Hollyoaks	D.S Drake	Minor role
2016–2017	Doctors	Jane Fairweather	Recurring role
2018	Grounded	Stewardess	Short film
2018	Patrick	Caroline	Film
2026–present	EastEnders	Gemma Hawkins	Regular role
