= Just a Groove (Nomad song) =

Single by Nomad

from the album Changing Cabins
- B-side: "I Don't Wanna Be the Last"
- Released: 1991
- Genre: Disco; hip house
- Length: 4:02
- Label: Rumour/EMI (UK)
- Songwriters: Damon Rochefort; Steve McCutcheon a.k.a. Steve Mac
- Producer: Damon Rochefort

Nomad singles chronology
"(I Wanna Give You) Devotion" (1991)	"Just a Groove" (1991)	"Something Special" (1991)

Music video
- "Just a Groove" on YouTube

"Just a Groove" is a song by English dance music group Nomad, released in 1991 by Rumour/EMI as the third single from their only album, Changing Cabins (1991). It was written by Damon Rochefort and Steve Mac, produced by Rochefort and features vocals by Sharon Dee Clarke. The song became a top-10 hit in European countries like Belgium, Greece, the Netherlands and Switzerland. In the UK, it peaked at number 16 on the UK Singles Chart, while on the Eurochart Hot 100, it reached number 25 in May 1991.

== Critical reception ==
Upon the release, Phil Cheeseman from Record Mirror wrote, "It's got a rolling beat, the odd burst of saxophone, a rap halfway through and most important of all, those crowd noises to kick it off. Another remix of 'Devotion'? Well, in a way. 'Just a Groove' is the brand new single from Nomad, who evidently figured that if a formula's good enough for one hit it'll do for two. Showing up main man Damon Rochefort's love of old disco with a cruising string backbone and a chorus that, infuriatingly, not one of us here at Record Mirror Towers can successfully trace back to the '70s disco track it was influenced by. 'Just a Groove' has enough sass to follow its predecessor. But, Sharon Dee Clarke's vocal and its catchy chart appeal notwithstanding, Nomad will, for better or worse, forever be judged on that anthem."

== Track listing ==
- 7" single, Belgium (1991)

A. "Just a Groove" – 3:50
B. "I Don't Wanna Be the Last" – 3:55

- 7", UK (1991)

A. "Just a Groove" – 3:50
B. "I Don't Wanna Be the Last" – 3:55

- 12", UK (1991)

A. "Just a Groove (Monday Club Remix)
B1. "Just a Groove (DJ's Rule the Mix - Part One)
B2. "Just a Groove (DJ's Rule the Mix - Part Two)

- CD single, Japan (1991)
1. "Just a Groove" (Club Mix) – 6:19
2. "Just a Groove" (7" Edit) – 3:59
3. "Just a Groove" (Vocal Attack) – 6:12
4. "Just a Groove" (Rave Mix) – 5:36
5. "Just a Groove" (Monday Club Remix) – 5:35
6. "Just a Groove" (DJ's Rule the Mix - Part 1) – 5:51
7. "Just a Groove" (DJ's Rule the Mix - Part 2) – 5:32
- CD single, UK (1991)
1. "Just a Groove" (7" Edit) – 4:02
2. "Just a Groove" (Club Mix) – 6:21
3. "Just a Groove" (Vocal Attack) – 6:10
- CD maxi-single, Belgium (1991)
1. "Just a Groove" – 3:50
2. "Just a Groove" (12" Mix) – 6:08
3. "Just a Groove" (Vocal Attack) – 6:04
- CD maxi-single, Remixes, Germany (1991)
1. "Just a Groove" (Monday Club Remix) – 5:35
2. "Just a Groove" (DJ's Rule the Mix - Part 1) – 5:50
3. "Just a Groove" (DJ's Rule the Mix - Part 2) – 5:31
- Cassette single, UK (1991)

A1. "Just a Groove"
A2. "I Don't Wanna Be the Last"
B1. "Just a Groove"
B2. "I Don't Wanna Be the Last"

== Charts ==
=== Weekly charts ===
Chart (1991)	Peak position
Australia (ARIA)	76
Austria (Ö3 Austria Top 40)	29
Belgium (Ultratop 50 Flanders)	10
Europe (Eurochart Hot 100)	25
Germany (GfK)	32
Greece (IFPI)	5
Ireland (IRMA)	12
Israel (Israeli Singles Chart)	16
Netherlands (Dutch Top 40)	4
Netherlands (Single Top 100)	6
Sweden (Sverigetopplistan)	40
Switzerland (Schweizer Hitparade)	10
UK Singles (OCC)	16
UK Airplay (Music Week)	23
UK Dance (Music Week)	6
UK Club Chart (Record Mirror)	4

=== Year-end charts ===
Chart (1991)	Position
UK Club Chart (Record Mirror)	13
