= Once (musical) =

2011 musical

- Broadway promotional poster
- Music: Glen Hansard; Markéta Irglová
- Lyrics: Glen Hansard; Markéta Irglová
- Book: Enda Walsh
- Setting: Dublin
- Basis: Once by John Carney
- Premiere: 2011: New York Theatre Workshop
- Productions: 2011 Off-Broadway; 2012 Broadway; 2013 West End; 2013 US Tour; 2016 US Tour; 2019 UK Tour; 2019 Buenos Aires; 2019 US Tour; 2023 São Paulo
- Awards: Tony Award for Best Musical; Tony Award for Best Book of a Musical; Laurence Olivier Award for Outstanding Achievement in Music

Once is a musical based on the 2007 film of the same name by John Carney. Like the film, music and lyrics were by Glen Hansard and Markéta Irglová, including the Academy Award-winning "Falling Slowly". The book for the musical was written by Enda Walsh. The musical premiered at the New York Theatre Workshop in 2011, before transferring to Broadway in 2012.

The production received eleven 2012 Tony Award nominations, and won eight including Best Musical, Best Actor and Best Book. The musical also won the 2012 Drama Desk Award for Outstanding Musical and the 2013 Grammy Award for Best Musical Theater Album. In 2013, it opened a London production and began a North American Tour.

In the musical, the cast also serves as the orchestra. A minimalist set is used, including a bar in center stage with chairs lining stage left and right. Exiting cast members simply step to the side of the stage and sit down. They serve as the orchestra from these chairs. The bar is used before the show and at intermission as a working bar for theater patrons.

== Productions ==
=== Off-Broadway (2011–2012) ===
Once premiered in a workshop at the American Repertory Theatre in Cambridge, MA, in April 2011. It transfed to New York Theatre Workshop where it began previews on 15 November 2011. Following previews, the production made its Off-Broadway debut on 6 December 2011 and closed 15 January 2012. Under the direction of John Tiffany, the original cast was led by Steve Kazee and Cristin Milioti as Guy and Girl, respectively. The production was nominated for Lucille Lortel Awards for Outstanding Musical, Outstanding Director, Outstanding Choreographer, Outstanding Scenic Design (Bob Crowley), Outstanding Lighting Design (Natasha Katz), Outstanding Sound Design (Clive Goodwin), and Outstanding Lead Actress. The production won the New York Drama Critics' Circle Award for Best Musical.

=== Broadway (2012–2015) ===
The musical then began previews on Broadway at the Bernard B. Jacobs Theatre from 28 February 2012 and officially opening on 18 March. Kazee and Milioti reprised their roles from the Off-Broadway cast. John Tiffany directed the production. The show was produced by Barbara Broccoli, John N. Hart Jr., Patrick Milling-Smith, Frederick Zollo, Brian Carmody, Michael G. Wilson, and Orin Wolf. The production received eleven Tony Award nominations, winning eight, including Best Musical. It also won the Drama League Award for Distinguished Production of a Musical for 2011–12. On 7 October 2014, it was announced that the musical would close 4 January 2015. The production played 1,167 regular performances and 22 previews by closing time.

=== Dublin/West End (2013–2015) ===
Following a limited engagement at Dublin's Gaiety Theatre from 22 February until 9 March 2013, starring Declan Bennett (Guy) and Zrinka Cvitešić (Girl), the show made its West End debut at the Phoenix Theatre, London. Previews began 16 March, which was followed by a 9 April opening night. Bennett and Cvitešić reprise their roles from the Dublin run. Bennett and Cvitešić made an appearance on BBC's The Graham Norton Show for the televised show on 31 May 2013. Prior to an interview, they performed "Falling Slowly". On 15 January 2014, the show was extended to 4 July 2015. Arthur Darvill replaced Bennett as Guy on 17 March 2014, reprising the role after an acclaimed run on Broadway, and continued in the role until 10 May 2014. Cvitešić also left her role as Girl on 10 May. David Hunter and Jill Winternitz then played Guy and Girl, respectively. Ronan Keating took over the lead role from 17 November 2014 to 21 March 2015, when the production closed.

=== U.S. national tours ===
==== First national tour (2013–2015) ====
On 1 October 2013 the first North American national tour launched in Providence, Rhode Island at the Providence Performing Arts Center. Stuart Ward and Dani de Waal played Guy and Girl, respectively. The tour ran through December 2015.

==== Second national tour (2016–2017) ====
A non-Equity North American national tour started in January 2016 in Utica, New York. It ran through April 2017, starring Sam Cieri and Mackenzie Lesser-Roy, who would go on to reprise the role of Girl in SpeakEasy Stage Company's 2019 production in Boston.

==== Third national tour (2019) ====
On 7 July 2019, it was announced that the show would once again tour the US beginning on 22 August in Ft. Myers, Florida, and continuing into 2020. Jack Gerhard played Guy opposite Mariah Lotz as Girl. Original Broadway and Off-Broadway cast member, J. Michael Zygo, was the production's director and musical director. The tour closed early on 23 December 2019, and all subsequent tour dates were cancelled.

=== Melbourne (2014–2015) ===
The first Australian production premiered at the Princess Theatre in Melbourne on 26 September 2014, and ran through 1 February 2015. Tom Parsons and Madeleine Jones played Guy and Girl. It was presented in association with the Melbourne Theatre Company.

=== Seoul (2014–2015) ===
The first non-English production was presented by Seensee Company and premiered on 14 December 2014, scheduled to run through 29 March 2015. Yoon Do-hyun and Lee Chang-hee played Guy, and Jeon Mi-do and Park Ji-yeon played Girl.

=== Toronto (2015) ===
A Canadian production opened 10 February and played through 28 June 2015 at the Ed Mirvish Theatre. The production starred Ian Lake as Guy and Trish Lindström as Girl. It garnered seven Dora Mavor Moore Award nominations in the Musical Theatre Division and won three, for Outstanding Production, Outstanding Ensemble and Outstanding Performance – Female for Lindström.

=== Dublin (2015–2017) ===
In March 2015, it was announced that Once would return to Dublin. It was scheduled to play a limited run from 4 July to 22 August at the Olympia Theatre. The cast included Tom Parsons as Guy and Megan Riordan as Girl. On 28 July, it was then announced that Once had been extended and would run until 12 September. On 4 December 2015 it was announced that Once would return to Dublin and would play at the Olympia Theatre from 2 July – 27 August 2016. In 2017, the musical returned again to the Olympia Theatre from 30 June – 26 August.

=== Seoul (2015) ===
After the success of the previous Korean production, cast members comprised from the Dublin, London, Australian and Canadian Once companies played on The Charlotte Theatre from 22 September to 1 November 2015.

=== Sydney (2019/2021) ===
The Darlinghurst Theatre Company production was opened to critical acclaim at the Eternity Playhouse in Sydney from 26 June to 23 July, where it sold out its entire season as well as its return season from 30 July to 4 August. It also played at the Illawarra Performing Arts Centre from 24 to 28 July. The show was directed by Richard Carroll and starred Toby Francis as Guy, Stefanie Caccamo as Girl and Victoria Falconer as Reza and the musical director.

The production returned to Darlinghurst Theatre Company in June 2021, again starring Toby Francis and Stefanie Caccamo with 6 new cast members including Jay Laga'aia, with plans for a tour to regional New South Wales, Canberra, and the Comedy Theatre, Melbourne through until October.

=== Buenos Aires (2019) ===
This production (locally translated Una vez en la vida) debuted in Buenos Aires at the Metropolitan Sura Theatre on 12 April 2019 and starring Eliseo Barrionuevo and Paula Reca. The production closed on 4 August 2019.

=== UK tour (2019–2020) ===
In June 2019 it was announced that Once will embark on its first ever UK Tour featuring Daniel Healy as Guy and Emma Lucia as Girl. The tour set to open at the Ashcroft Playhouse, Fairfield Halls in December 2019. The UK Tour was prematurely cancelled as a result of the COVID-19 pandemic and as yet has not been rescheduled.

=== Barn Theatre (2023) ===
The Barn Theatre Cirencester staged Once as part of its summer season. The new staging, directed by Dominic Shaw, opened on July 3rd with Sarah Moss as Girl and Tomas Wolstenholme as Guy (also West End Cast, Seoul cast).

=== Pitlochry (2026) ===
In October 2025, it was announced by Artistic Director Alan Cumming that a revival of the original Broadway production would open at Pitlochry Festival Theatre from 23 May - 27 June 2026. This production reunited the entire original Broadway creative team, led by director John Tiffany, and starred Dylan Wood as Guy and Lydia White as Girl.

== Plot ==
Act I

A thirty-something Dublin busker (identified only as "Guy") sings a heartfelt ballad of unrequited love on a Dublin street, accompanying himself on guitar ("Leave"). He then puts his guitar in its case and turns to leave without it but a young Czech woman (identified only as "Girl"), who has been listening to him sing approaches. She asks numerous personal questions about his songs and he replies that he wrote most of them for a girlfriend who broke up with him and moved to New York City. He is giving up on his music because the memories of his failed relationship are too painful so he now works as a vacuum cleaner repairman in his father's shop. Girl responds that she has a vacuum that "does not suck" and asks him to fix it. She offers to pay for the repair by playing piano for him. Over his protests, she takes the sheet music for a new song from his jacket. Reluctantly, Guy picks up his guitar and they play the song together ("Falling Slowly"). Girl suggests that he could win his old girlfriend back by singing her that song. Guy brushes this off but Girl reminds him that he now owes her a vacuum repair so they head to his father's shop ("The North Strand"). As Guy fixes the vacuum, Girl becomes acquainted with his father, who seems to like her. Once the vacuum is repaired, Guy impulsively invites Girl to his bedroom, above the shop. They are clearly attracted to each other but when he attempts to kiss her she stops him and leaves ("The Moon"). The next day he apologises and they write, rehearse and record songs together. Girl introduces Guy to her family, including her young daughter, Ivanka ("Ej, Pada, Pada, Rosicka"). After Guy leaves, Girl plays one of his songs on the piano, substituting her own lyrics as she thinks of him ("If You Want Me"). The next morning Girl tells Guy that she has arranged a meeting with a banker ("Broken Hearted Hoover Fixer Sucker Guy"). To persuade the bank manager to approve a loan – which would enable Guy to take his music to New York – Guy plays him a song ("Say It to Me Now"). The banker is impressed with his talent, approves the loan and adds that he can play guitar as well. He plays a song for them ("Abandoned in Bandon") and though he is not a very good singer, they invite him to play in the band. The following night at a nightclub, Guy tells Girl that she has convinced him that his musical career is worth pursuing. "Good", she replies, because its open mic night at the club and she has signed him up to perform as "The Hoover Man". He is reluctant but eventually takes the stage. As he sings, it seems like he is now singing to Girl, not his ex-girlfriend ("Gold").

Act II

During band practice, one of the musicians gets into an argument with the bank manager. He opposes capitalism, he says, despite the fact that he owns the shop where they are rehearsing. Guy and Girl retreat to a hill overlooking the city where the two share a brief, tender moment. Girl tells Guy, in Czech, that she loves him but when he asks her to translate, she replies, "It looks like rain". Guy realizes that he has fallen in love with Girl and wonders how he will live without her when he moves to New York ("Sleeping"). The next day the band records a demo for a major record label ("When Your Mind's Made Up"). After receiving praise for their performance, the band members take a break. Girl remains at the piano, and thinking she is alone, plays one of her own compositions that reveals the depth of her feelings for Guy ("The Hill"). Guy, who has been listening, compliments her on her song. He suggests that she and Ivanka move to New York with him because they clearly have feelings for each other that they cannot ignore. Girl answers angrily that he cannot feel that way. Incredulous, Guy asks why and Girl replies that her husband – Ivanka's father – is trying to reconcile with her and for the sake of their daughter she must consider it ("It Cannot Be About That"). The following morning the band gathers at the hill to voice their hopes for success with the impending album ("Gold (A Cappella)"). Guy asks Girl to spend his last night in Dublin with him but she demurs, because it would only result in "hanky-panky", which is a "bad idea"; but ultimately she agrees to come to the vacuum shop. Back at the shop, Guy plays the demo for his father. Impressed and moved, he gives Guy money to help him get settled in New York. Then Guy, encouraged by Girl, calls his ex-girlfriend in New York, who is happy about his imminent arrival, and seems willing to give their relationship another try. A few days later Girl comes home to find a piano with a bright red bow on it – a gift from Guy. She sheds a few tears, then sits at the piano and sings; as Guy, in his New York apartment, sings the same song ("Falling Slowly (Reprise)").

== Principal roles and original casts ==
Character	Original Broadway Cast	Original West End Cast	Melbourne Cast	UK Tour Cast	West End Concert	Barn Theatre Cast	Pitlochry Revival Cast
Guy	Steve Kazee	Declan Bennett	Tom Parsons	Daniel Healy	Jamie Muscato	Tomas Wolstenholme	Dylan Wood
Girl	Cristin Milioti	Zrinka Cvitešić	Madeleine Jones	Emma Lucia	Carrie Hope Fletcher	Sarah Moss	Lydia White
Réza	Elizabeth A. Davis	Flora Spencer-Longhurst	Amy Lehpamer	Ellen Chivers	Kamilla Gregorovitch	Amy Bastani	Loren O'Dair
Eamon	David Abeles	Gareth O’Connor	Gerard Carroll	Matthew Burns	Phil Adèle	Theo Diedrick	Connor Going
Andrej	Will Connolly	Jos Slovick	Keegan Joyce	James William-Pattison	Jos Slovick	Harry Curley	Jos Slovick
Da	David Patrick Kelly	Michael O’Connor	Greg Stone	Peter Peverley	Alasdair Macrae	Toby Bradford	Sean McLevy
Baruska	Anne L. Nathan	Valda Aviks	Susan-Ann Walker	Susannah van den Berg	Susannah van den Berg	Fiona Bruce	Allison Harding
Svec	Lucas Papaelias	Ryan Fletcher	Brent Hill	Lloyd Gorman	Loris Scarpa	Thomas Parrish	Loris Scarpa
Bank Manager	Andy Taylor	Jez Unwin	Anton Berezin	Samuel Martin	Angus Tikka	Toby Bradford	Laurie Jamieson
Ex-Girlfriend	Erikka Walsh	Miria Parvin	Jane Patterson	Rosalind Ford	Christina Tedders	Amy Bastani	Loren O'Dair
Billy	Paul Whitty	Aidan Kelly	Colin Dean	Dan Bottomley	Seán Keany	David Schute	Charlie West
Emcee	J. Michael Zygo	Gabriel Vick	Ben Brown	David Heywood	Michael Vien	Theo Diedrick	Connor Going
Ivanka	Ripley Sobo, McKayla Twiggs	Poppy-Lily Baker, Mia-Jai Bryan, Pacha Anna Green, Nancy Ann Jeans		Lydia Prosser, Heather Warner, Robyn Elwell, Emma Freely	Tabitha Storton, Mia Raggio	Jessica Chappell, Eleanor Chappell, Isabella Reynolds, Adelaide Richardson, Eliza Richardson, Nancy Wells	

=== Notable cast replacements ===
==== Broadway ====
- Guy: Arthur Darvill, Paul Alexander Nolan
- Girl: Laura Dreyfuss, Joanna Christie
- Réza: Katrina Lenk, Claire Wellin
- Eamon: Scott Stangland
- Andrej: Carlos Valdes
- Ivanka: Laurel Griggs

==== West End ====
- Guy: Arthur Darvill, David Hunter, Ronan Keating, Daniel Healy

== Musical numbers ==
Except where indicated, all musical numbers were written by Glen Hansard and Markéta Irglová.

Act 1

- "The North Strand" – Instrumental
- "Leave" – Guy
- "Falling Slowly" – Guy & Girl
- "The Moon" – Andrej & Ensemble
- "Ej, Pada, Pada, Rosicka" – Ensemble
- "If You Want Me" – Girl, Guy, & Ensemble
- "Broken Hearted Hoover Fixer Sucker Guy" – Guy
- "Say It to Me Now" – Guy
- "Abandoned in Bandon" – Bank Manager (composed by Martin Lowe, Andy Taylor and Enda Walsh)
- "Gold" – Guy & Ensemble (composed by Fergus O'Farrell)

Act 2

- "Sleeping" – Guy
- "When Your Mind's Made Up" – Guy, Girl, and Ensemble
- "The Hill" – Girl
- "It Cannot Be About That" – Instrumental
- "Gold (A Cappella)" – Company
- "Falling Slowly (Reprise)" – Guy, Girl, and Ensemble

"Once", the titular song from the film, was cut from the musical, but was performed by the cast of the Broadway production during special curtain calls, such as at Cristin Milioti, Elizabeth A. Davis, and Will Connolly's final performance, and when Markéta Irglová visited.

== Reception ==
=== Critical response ===
Ben Brantley, in his review of the New York Theatre Workshop production in The New York Times, wrote:

"In translating Once into three dimensions, the playwright Enda Walsh and the director John Tiffany haven’t steered clear of what were probably inevitable excesses. The script is now steeped in wise and folksy observations about committing to love and taking chances, most of which are given solemn and thickly accented utterance by Girl (played by Cristin Milioti), who is Czech. Guy, played by Steve Kazee, has been transformed from a shaggy nerd into a figure of leading-man handsomeness, while Girl has turned into a full-fledged version of what she only threatened to be in the film: a kooky, life-affirming waif who is meant to be irresistible ... But a merciful reversal occurs when Once breaks into music, which is often. Characters become less adorably overwrought and more genuinely conflicted, with distinctive personalities instead of standard-issue ones. The songs (written by Mr. Hansard and Ms. Irglová) soar with rough-edged, sweet-and-sad ambivalence that is seldom visited in contemporary American musicals."

Brantley later reviewed the Broadway production, also in The New York Times, writing:

"When I first saw the musical Once at the New York Theater Workshop last December, it registered as a little too twee, too conventionally sentimental, for the East Village. Yet on Broadway – at the Bernard B. Jacobs Theater to be exact, where Once opened on Sunday night – what is essentially the same production feels as vital and surprising as the early spring that has crept up on Manhattan. And what was always wonderful about Once, its songs and its staging, has been magnified. In the meantime its appealing stars, Steve Kazee and Cristin Milioti, have only grown in presence and dimensionality."

In reviewing the West End production for London Theatre Guide Peter Brown describes the show's key to success as lying in the songs of Hansard and Irglová:

"what makes this musical really special and puts it in a different league to other offerings is the captivating, magical quality of the songs. Almost from the first note, you realise you are listening to music that is extraordinarily distinctive, powerfully emotional and hugely affecting – in a word... stunning."

== Accolades ==
=== Original Broadway production ===
Year	Award	Category	Nominee(s)	Result
2012	Tony Award	Best Musical		Won
2012	Tony Award	Best Book of a Musical	Enda Walsh	Won
2012	Tony Award	Best Actor in a Musical	Steve Kazee	Won
2012	Tony Award	Best Actress in a Musical	Cristin Milioti	Nominated
2012	Tony Award	Best Featured Actress in a Musical	Elizabeth A. Davis	Nominated
2012	Tony Award	Best Direction of a Musical	John Tiffany	Won
2012	Tony Award	Best Choreography	Steven Hoggett	Nominated
2012	Tony Award	Best Orchestrations	Martin Lowe	Won
2012	Tony Award	Best Scenic Design	Bob Crowley	Won
2012	Tony Award	Best Lighting Design	Natasha Katz	Won
2012	Tony Award	Best Sound Design	Clive Goodwin	Won
2012	Drama Desk Award	Outstanding Musical		Won
2012	Drama Desk Award	Outstanding Director of a Musical	John Tiffany	Won
2012	Drama Desk Award	Outstanding Music	Glen Hansard and Markéta Irglová	Nominated
2012	Drama Desk Award	Outstanding Lyrics	Glen Hansard and Markéta Irglová	Won
2012	Drama Desk Award	Outstanding Sound Design	Clive Goodwin	Nominated
2012	Drama Desk Award	Outstanding Orchestrations	Martin Lowe	Won
2012	New York Drama Critics' Circle Award	Best Musical	Enda Walsh, Glen Hansard and Markéta Irglová	Won
2013	Grammy Award	Best Musical Theater Album	Steve Kazee & Cristin Milioti, principal soloists; Steven Epstein & Martin Lowe, producers (Glen Hansard & Marketa Irglova, composers/lyricists)	Won

=== London production ===
Year	Award	Category	Nominee	Result	Ref
2014	Laurence Olivier Award	Best New Musical		Nominated	
2014	Laurence Olivier Award	Best Actress in a Musical	Zrinka Cvitešić	Won	
2014	Laurence Olivier Award	Best Set Design	Bob Crowley	Nominated	
2014	Laurence Olivier Award	Best Theatre Choreographer	Steven Hoggett	Nominated	
2014	Laurence Olivier Award	Best Sound Design	Clive Goodwin	Nominated	
2014	Laurence Olivier Award	Outstanding Achievement in Music	Martin Lowe, Glen Hansard and Markéta Irglová	Won	

=== Toronto production ===
The production was nominated in the Musical Theatre Division of the Dora Mavor Moore Awards

Year	Award	Category	Nominee(s)	Result
2015	Dora Mavor Moore Awards	Outstanding Production		Won
2015	Dora Mavor Moore Awards	Outstanding Performance – Male	Ian Lake	Nominated
2015	Dora Mavor Moore Awards	Outstanding Performance – Female	Trish Lindström	Won
2015	Dora Mavor Moore Awards	Outstanding Performance – Ensemble		Won
2015	Dora Mavor Moore Awards	Outstanding Direction	John Tiffany	Nominated
2015	Dora Mavor Moore Awards	Outstanding Choreography	Steven Hoggett	Nominated
2015	Dora Mavor Moore Awards	Outstanding Musical Direction	Martin Lowe	Nominated
