= Ellis (TV series) =

British television series

- Also known as: Inspector Ellis
- Genre: Crime drama Detective; Mystery
- Created by: Paul Logue; Siân Ejiwunmi-Le Berre
- Written by: Paul Logue; Siân Ejiwunmi-Le Berre
- Starring: Sharon D. Clarke; Andrew Gower
- Country of origin: United Kingdom
- Original language: English
- No. of series: 2
- No. of episodes: 7

Production
- Executive producers: Catherine Mackin; Bea Tammer; Michele Buck; Lucy Raffety; Siân Ejiwunmi-Le Berre
- Producer: Chris Martin
- Running time: 47-92 minutes
- Production companies: Company Pictures; Northern Ireland Screen

Original release
- Network: Channel 5
- Release: 31 October 2024 – present

Ellis (also titled Inspector Ellis) is a British crime drama television series for Channel 5 starring Sharon D. Clarke as Detective Chief Inspector Ellis. It premiered in the United Kingdom on 31 October 2024 on Channel 5 with a three-part series.

A second series, consisting of four episodes, debuted on 10 March 2026.

== Premise ==
Detective chief inspector (DCI) Ellis and her assistant, Detective sergeant (DS) Harper, are sent to help struggling police investigations at different local police stations.

== Cast ==
=== Main ===
- Sharon D. Clarke as DCI Ellis (series 1–present)
- Andrew Gower as DS Chet Harper (series 1–present)

=== Recurring ===
- Allison Harding as Assistant chief constable (ACC) Leighton
- Charlotte McCurry as Detective Constable (DC) Kate Trent

=== Episodic ===
Episode 1: Hanmore

- Wayne Fosket as Michael Edwards
- Tom McKay as Eric Mercer
- Barry O'Connor as Peter Kelly
- Chris Reilly as DCI Jim Belmont
- Catherine Walker as Louise Edwards
- Michael Wildman as Stephen Mason
- Kaye Wragg as Linda Bradley
- Noa Baurain as Rain Bradley
- Tallulah Evans as Carrie Booth
- Beau Gadsdon as Amy Mercer
- Freya Hannan-Mills as Maggie Bradley
- Brian Markey as Charles Braine
- Conor Sánchez as Aaron Kelly
- Daire Scully as Rowan Edwards

Episode 2: Callorwell

- Orla Charlton as Carla Duffy
- Tim Dutton as DCI Hain
- Jonathan Harden as Adam Reid
- Stephanie Levi-John as Naomi McKeith
- Paul Mallon as Tim Jones
- Sam Marks as DI Jamie Morrison
- Kirsten Foster as CSI Christine Bennett
- Jenny Kavanagh as Jenny Rawler
- Aoibheann McCann as DC Leah Thompson
- Michael McCloskey-Ooi as Mark Reid
- Fionn Ó Loingsigh as Curtis Keogh
- William Travis as Sergeant Frank Landry

Episode 3: Brindleton

- Josh Bolt as DS Archie Dent
- Amanda Drew as DCI Cotton
- Rina Mahoney as Lydia Green
- Charlie De Melo as Leo Braxton
- Michael Simkins as Gerry Rees-Mortimer
- Charley Webb as Abbie Summerfield
- Mark Field as Kane Harrison
- Harry Marcus as Rory Summerfield
- Tama Matheson as Oz Hoffman
- Jade Matthew as Rachel Hoffman
- Shanaya Rafaat as Soraya Mansoori
- Richard Sherwood as Alex Scanlan
- David Sterne as Foster Lang

Episodes 4 & 5: Ashenham

- John Hollingworth as Malcolm Oliver
- Sasha Desouza-Willock as PC Suravi Kareem
- Joel Morris as Joseph Ward
- Niamh Blackshaw as Jade Bell
- Cariad Lloyd as Pippa Ellerson
- Keir Charles as Chris Ellerson
- Sonny Walker as Kelvin Jones

Episodes 6 & 7: Elmsly

- Mark Addy as Elliot Quinn
- Matilda Freeman as Mackenzie Quinn
- Stephen Tompkinson as DCI Chalmers
- Judy Flynn as Wendy Pyke
- Caroline O'Neill as Rosie Watts
- Jack Bandeira as Tim Selby
- Sophie Stanton as Tina Marshall

== Production ==
The series is written by Paul Logue and Siân Ejiwunmi-Le Berre and produced by Company Pictures. The three-part series consisting of two-hour episodes is executive produced by Catherine Mackin, Bea Tammer, Michele Buck and Lucy Raffety. Chris Martin is series producer.

Filming took place in Northern Ireland in the spring of 2024. Filming locations included Dromore in County Down, Gracehill in County Antrim near Ballymena,

The series was renewed for a second series with filming scheduled for June 2025.

== Broadcast ==
The series was broadcast on Channel 5 in the UK on 31 October 2024. It was launched internationally shortly after on Acorn TV under the title 'Inspector Ellis'.

The season launched with 'Hanmore' as the pilot and brought in 1.3 million viewers.

It started showing in the Netherlands on BBC NL on 17 July 2026.

== Episodes ==
=== Series 1 (2024) ===
No. overall	No. in series	Title	Directed by	Written by	Original release date
1	1	"Hanmore"	Nick Hurran	Siân Ejiwunmi-Le Berre with Paul Logue	31 October 2024
A car with the son of an ex-MP, Rowan Edwards, is found in a lake in the Peak District National Park and his girlfriend, Maggie Bradley, has been missing for more than two days. The former MP doubts the abilities of the local police, so DCI Ellis is asked to investigate by ACC Leighton. The local force, almost entirely made up of white men, are upset by the perceived political interference of Ellis, an outsider and Black woman, taking over the investigation. Her liaison, DS Harper, is tasked with bringing her up to speed while also keeping an eye on her.
2	2	"Callorwell"	Ryan Tohill	Siân Ejiwunmi-Le Berre and Jessica Ruston	7 November 2024
DS Jenny Rawler goes missing on the same day drug baron Carla Duffy is arrested. ACC Leighton asks Ellis to investigate. Rawler's husband is convinced that her fellow officers are responsible for her disappearance. Rawler was about to file charges of bullying against her DCI. Soon, Rawler is found dead.
3	3	"Brindleton"	Andy Tohill	Maria Ward	14 November 2024
Oz and Rachel Hoffman disappear near a notorious river beauty (and danger) spot, the Swelt (from the Old English: "to cause to die"), three days after their wedding. The local police force are overwhelmed with "citizen journalists" who post on social media. Rachel's body is found downstream. Her father believes Oz killed Rachel. Soon Oz's body is also found.

=== Series 2 (2026) ===
No. overall	No. in series	Title	Directed by	Written by	Original release date
4	1	"Ashenham: Part One"	Edward Bazalgette	Siân Ejiwunmi-Le Berre	10 March 2026
5	2	"Ashenham: Part Two"	Edward Bazalgette	Siân Ejiwunmi-Le Berre	11 March 2026
6	3	"Elmsly: Part One"	Max Myers	Oliver Frampton	17 March 2026
7	4	"Elmsly: Part Two"	Max Myers	Oliver Frampton	18 March 2026

== Reception ==
Writing in the Radio Times, Morgan Cormack said the show was "really rather good" and far from the cosy-crime genre that some viewers may have expected, and that it had some "very topical, gritty subject matter that has some eerie real-world similarities". Cormack also states that “Ellis certainly isn't the first enigmatic detective to grace our screens” but felt that scriptwriter Ejiwunmi-Le Berre successfully created a character "that doesn't fall into the stereotypical tropes".
