= Siân Ejiwunmi-Le Berre =

British actress, screenwriter and songwriter

Siân Ejiwunmi-Le Berre (also credited as Siân Martin) is a British actress, screenwriter and songwriter.

== Life and career ==
Ejiwunmi-Le Berre was raised in Wales and North London. She is of Kalabari, Yoruba, French and Saint Lucian descent.

As an actress, she has appeared in projects such as EastEnders, Trial & Retribution, About a Boy, Holby City, Doctors and Silent Witness.

In late 2023, Ejiwunmi-Le Berre made her television screenwriting debut with Murder is Easy, a two-part BBC drama adapted from Agatha Christie's 1939 novel. The plot saw some updates, notably emphasising the setting of post-colonial Britain and re-working the protagonist into a Nigerian immigrant partially inspired by Ejiwunmi-Le Berre's own father and grandfather.

With Paul Logue, Ejiwunmi-Le Berre co-created, writes and executive-produced the Channel 5 crime drama Ellis starring Sharon D. Clarke as a detective chief inspector who tackles investigations in different local areas and deals with the white and male oriented world of British policing. The first series premiered in 2024, with a second following in 2026.

Ejiwunmi-Le Berre has worked in the writers room for series such as Little Disasters and Rivals, and has two projects, Misplaced and Touchline in development.

She has written scripts for BBC Radio 4. These include When Fanny Met Germaine, about the meeting of Germaine de Stael and Fanny Burney, a dramatisation of Dangerous Liaisons starring Nicola Coughlan, and The Medici, regarding the House of Medici.
