= Nomad (British band) =

British house music duo

- Origin: United Kingdom
- Genres: House music
- Past members: Damon Rochefort; Steve McCutcheon; Sharon D. Clarke

Nomad was a house music duo from the United Kingdom who had several hits on the US Hot Dance Club Play chart as well as successes on the UK Singles Chart. Group members were Damon Rochefort (Nomad is Damon spelled backwards, thus the group's name), Steve McCutcheon and Sharon D. Clarke.

In 1991, they hit number 1 on the US Dance chart and number 2 in the UK with the song "(I Wanna Give You) Devotion", billed as Nomad featuring MC Mikee Freedom. Their follow-up single, "Just a Groove", reached number 16 on the UK Singles Chart.

Another single was "Something Special", also from the album Changing Cabins. Then followed "Your Love Is Lifting Me" and "24 Hours a Day". A second album, titled Different Drum, was discussed, but it never materialised.

== Discography ==
=== Album ===
List of albums, with selected chart positions
Title	Album details	Peak chart positions
Title	Album details	AUS
Changing Cabins	Released: 1991; Format: CD, cassette; Label: Rumour Records	105

=== Singles ===
Year	Title	Peak positions										Album
Year	Title	UK	AUS	AUT	BEL (FL)	GER	IRE	NED	SWE	SWI	US Dance	Album
1989	"The Raggamuffin Number" (featuring Daddae Harvey)	—	—	—	—	—	—	—	—	—	—	Changing Cabins
1990	"(I Wanna Give You) Devotion" (featuring MC Mikee Freedom)	2	37	10	8	13	10	5	11	6	1	Changing Cabins
1991	"Just a Groove"	16	76	29	10	32	12	6	40	10	—	Changing Cabins
1991	"Something Special"	73	146	—	43	—	—	15	—	—	37	Changing Cabins
1992	"Your Love Is Lifting Me"	60	149	—	39	—	—	31	—	—	—	Non-album singles
1992	"24 Hours a Day"	61	—	—	—	—	—	—	—	—	—	Non-album singles
1995	"(I Wanna Give You) Devotion (Remixes)"	42	—	—	—	—	—	—	—	—	—	Non-album singles
2003	"(I Wanna Give You) Devotion" (Spike vs. Nomad)	179	—	—	—	—	—	—	—	—	—	Non-album singles
"—" denotes releases that did not chart or were not released.

== See also ==
- List of number-one dance hits (United States)
- List of artists who reached number one on the US Dance chart
