= Murder Is Easy =

1939 mystery novel by Agatha Christie

- Dust-jacket illustration of the first UK edition
- Author: Agatha Christie
- Language: English
- Series: Superintendent Battle
- Genre: Crime novel
- Publisher: Collins Crime Club
- Publication date: 5 June 1939
- Publication place: United Kingdom
- Media type: Print (hardback & paperback)
- Pages: 256 (first edition, hardback)
- ISBN: 978-0-00-713682-7
- Preceded by: Hercule Poirot's Christmas
- Followed by: And Then There Were None

Murder Is Easy is a detective fiction novel by Agatha Christie first published in the UK by the Collins Crime Club in June 1939, and in the US by Dodd, Mead and Company in September the same year under the title Easy to Kill. Christie's Superintendent Battle has a cameo appearance at the end, but plays no part in either the solution of the mystery or the apprehension of the criminal. The UK edition retailed at seven shillings and sixpence (7/6), and the US edition at $2.

The novel concerns the efforts of a retired police officer, Luke Fitzwilliam, to discover the identity of a serial killer active in the village of Wychwood under Ashe. He learns that the series of deaths were mistaken for accidents by the locals, while the nobleman Lord Whitfield mysteriously attributes most of them to divine justice.

== Plot summary ==
Upon his return to England after his overseas job in the police, Luke Fitzwilliam shares a London-bound train carriage with Lavinia Pinkerton. She talks to him about her reason for travelling to Scotland Yard: she plans to report a serial killer in her village and tells him who was killed and who will next be killed – Amy Gibbs, Tommy Pierce, and Harry Carter have been killed; Dr John Humbleby will be the next victim. This woman reminds him of a favourite aunt, so he replies politely and recalls what she said.

Luke reads of Miss Pinkerton's death the next day, and then of the death of Dr Humbleby, who has died of septicaemia. Luke will not let this rest, and he travels to the village, Wychwood under Ashe, where his good friend connects him to his cousin Bridget Conway.

Luke poses as an author researching material for a book on beliefs in witchcraft and superstition, as he investigates. He stays at the home of Gordon Ragg aka Lord Whitfield (Easterfield in the US edition), claiming to be a cousin of Bridget Conway, Whitfield's secretary and fiancée. He and Conway receive the assistance of Honoria Waynflete, a woman who, they believe, may know the person behind the deaths. He talks with villagers to learn the stories of the recent murders, including Mr Abbot, the solicitor who fired Tommy Pierce from his service; the Reverend Mr Wake, local rector; Mr Ellsworthy, an antique shop owner who appears to be mentally unstable; and Dr Thomas, Humbleby's younger partner.

Most people in the village view the series of deaths as accidents, not murders.

Luke believes Ellsworthy to be the killer because of his mental instability. Seeing Ellsworthy return home with blood on his hands at the summer solstice adds to this image. Later, Luke and Miss Waynflete witness Whitfield arguing with his chauffeur, Rivers, who had taken Whitfield's Rolls-Royce for a joyride.

Luke and Bridget realise that they are in love with each other, then they find Rivers dead, killed by a blow to the head. After dinner in Gordon's home, Luke listens to Gordon tell the story of how anyone who insults or disrespects him is avenged. He lists all the murdered locals and their offence: Mrs Horton had argued with him, Tommy Pierce did mocking impressions of him, Harry Carter shouted at him while drunk, Amy Gibbs was impertinent to him, Humbleby disagreed with him on the village water supply, and Rivers used his car without permission and then spoke disrespectfully to him. All of them died soon afterwards. He believes this is divine justice.

Luke and Bridget decide to leave Gordon's house. Luke goes off to meet with Superintendent Battle down from London to resolve this case, leaving Bridget. They will tell Gordon of their decision when Luke returns.

Bridget does not wait; she tells Gordon of her decision to break off her engagement with him while Luke is out.

Luke decides that Gordon is directly responsible for the deaths. Miss Waynflete confirms his suspicions. She tells him of how when they were younger, she had been engaged to marry Gordon. One evening, Whitfield killed her pet bird, with the appearance that he enjoyed doing it. She says she ended their engagement.

Bridget decides to stay at Honoria Waynflete's house, after asking Luke to tell her exactly what Miss Pinkerton told him. Bridget does not drink the tea that Miss Waynflete brings her, as she does not like tea in general.

Bridget and Honoria take a walk in the woods. Honoria reveals herself to be the murderer, as she holds a knife to add Bridget to her list of victims. As will be revelead later, it was she who killed her own pet and Gordon that ended their engagement. She had vowed revenge on Gordon after he returned as a wealthy man to the village.

Her plan was to set him up as obviously guilty for crimes he did not commit, that she commits. She encouraged him in the belief that God exacted retribution from those who disrespected him.

Honoria poisoned the tea for Lydia Horton. Honoria killed Amy by swapping the bottles around in the night and locking the door from the outside using pincers. She killed Carter by pushing him off the bridge on the day he had a row with Whitfield, and she likewise pushed Tommy Pierce out of the window while he was working in the library where she worked.

Honoria had seen that Lavinia Pinkerton realised she was the killer and that Humbleby would be her next victim. Honoria had followed Lavinia into London and then pushed her in front of a passing car. She then hoped to frame Gordon by telling a witness that she saw the registration number of his Rolls-Royce. After inviting Humbleby round to her house, she cut his hand with scissors. She then applied a dressing to the wound, a dressing with pus seeping from her cat's ear. After witnessing Rivers being sacked, Honoria hits him with a sandbag and caves his skull in with the stone pineapple.

Honoria does not know that Bridget did not drink the tea with a sleeping drug in it; Bridget pretends to be sleepy, then prods her to talk about herself, buying time and a full confession. Further, Honoria had arranged for Gordon to be seen walking alone through the area where Bridget's body will be. Instead, Bridget fights with Honoria. Bridget calls out to Luke for help and he hears her in time.

After a brief meeting with Mrs Humbleby, the doctor's widow, Luke realises that Honoria may well be the murderer and runs to rescue Bridget. Miss Pinkerton had never said man or woman, simply referred to the murderer.

Superintendent Battle tells Luke and Bridget that Honoria Waynflete has lost her mind upon being arrested. Gordon cannot accept that it was not divine justice, and settles back into his bachelor life running local newspapers.

Bridget and Luke leave the village to live together as a married couple.

== Characters ==
=== Main characters ===
- Luke Fitzwilliam – an ex-police officer in Mayang Strait
- Bridget Conway – Jimmy Lorrimer's cousin, and Luke's connection to Miss Pinkerton's village
- Lord Whitfield (Easterfield in the U.S. edition) – Gordon Ragg, a self-made millionaire, and Bridget's fiancé; he owns Ashe Manor
- Honoria Waynflete – a spinster once betrothed to Gordon Ragg

=== Suspects ===
- Mr Ellsworthy – the owner of the antique shop, who performs occult rituals
- Dr Geoffrey Thomas – the village doctor (and partner of the late Dr Humbleby)
- Major Horton – a widower who owns bulldogs
- Mr Abbot – a local solicitor who employed Tommy Pierce
- Mr Wake – the local rector

=== Supporting characters ===
- Mrs Anstruther – Bridget's aunt
- Jimmy Lorrimer – Luke's friend, Bridget's cousin
- Mrs Church – Amy Gibb's aunt
- Mrs Pierce – Tommy's mother, has a tobacco and paper shop
- Mrs Jessie Humbleby – widow of Dr Humbleby, Rose's mother
- Rose Humbleby – daughter of Dr Humbleby
- Superintendent Battle – Inspector from Scotland Yard who helps to close the case and arrest the suspect.
- Sir William Ossington – Billy Bones, Luke's friend at Scotland Yard

=== Victims ===
- Harry Carter – the landlord of the "Seven Stars" and a drunkard
- Amy Gibbs – a servant
- Mrs Lydia Horton – Major Horton's wife
- Dr Humbleby – a local doctor
- Tommy Pierce – an annoying youth
- Miss Lavinia Pinkerton – a spinster
- Mr Rivers – chauffeur to Lord Whitfield

== Literary significance and reception ==
The Times Literary Supplement of 10 June 1939 published a review of the book by Maurice Percy Ashley, together with And Death Came Too by Richard Hull which began "A week in which new novels by Mr Hull and Mrs Christie appear should be a red letter week for connoisseurs of detective fiction. One must, however, reluctantly confess that neither of them is fully up to standard."

After considering in isolation And Death Came Too, Ashley turned his attention to Murder Is Easy and started, "Mrs Christie has abandoned M. Hercule Poirot in her new novel, but it must be confessed that his understudy, Luke Fitzwilliam, a retired policeman from the Mayang States is singularly lacking in 'little grey matter.' Poirot may have recently become, with advancing years, a trifle staid, but absence makes the heart grow fonder of him." After outlining the basics of the plot and the romantic interests of the main character, Mr Ashley concluded, "He (Luke) is less effective a detective than as a lover, which is not surprising since neither he nor the reader is provided with any clear clues pointing to the fantastically successful murderer. The love interest scarcely compensates for the paucity of detection and the characters verge on caricature; nor is Fitzwilliam able to recapture vividly enough the circumstances of the earlier murders."

In The New York Times Book Review for 24 September 1939, Kay Irvin said the book was "one of Agatha Christie's best mystery novels, a story fascinating in its plot, clever and lively in its characters and brilliant in its technique." She concluded, "The story's interest is unflagging, and the end brings excitement as well as surprise."

William Blunt in The Observer of 4 June 1939 raised a question regarding Christie's abilities to write non-crime fiction, which demonstrates that her pen name identity of Mary Westmacott was not yet public knowledge: "I should hate to have to state on oath which I thought was Agatha Christie's best story, but I do think I can say that this is well up in the first six. The humour and humanity of its detail raise a question which only one person can give an answer. Agatha Christie has grown accustomed to working her embroidery on a background of black. Could she, or could she not, leave death and detection out, and embroider as well on green? I believe she is one of the few detective novelists who could. If she would let herself try, just for fun. I believe it would be very good fun for other people, too."

E.R. Punshon in The Guardian's issue of 11 July 1939 said that, "Readers may miss the almost supernatural cunning of Poirot, but then if Luke also depended on the famous 'little grey cells' he would be merely another Poirot instead of having his own blundering, straightforward, yet finally effective methods." Mr. Punshon summed up by saying that the story, "must be counted as yet another proof of Mrs Christie's inexhaustible ingenuity."

Mary Dell of the Daily Mirror, wrote on 8 June 1939, "It'll keep you guessing will this latest book from the pen of one of the best thriller writers ever."

An unnamed reviewer in the Toronto Daily Star of 2 December 1939 said, "An anemic thread of romance threatens to sever on occasion but the mystery is satisfying and full of suspense."

Robert Barnard: "Archetypal Mayhem Parva story, with all the best ingredients: Cranford-style village with 'about six women to every man'; doctors, lawyers, retired colonels and antique dealers; suspicions of black magic; and, as optional extra ingredient, a memorably awful press lord. And of course a generous allowance of sharp old spinsters. Shorter than most on detection, perhaps because the detection is, until the end, basically amateur. One of the classics."

== Publication history ==
- 1939, Collins Crime Club (London), 5 June 1939, Hardcover, 256 pp
- 1939, Dodd Mead and Company (New York), September 1939, Hardcover, 248 pp
- 1945, Pocket Books, Paperback, 152 pp (Pocket number 319)
- 1951, Pan Books, Paperback, 250 pp (Pan number 161)
- 1957, Penguin Books, Paperback, 172 pp
- 1960, Fontana Books (Imprint of HarperCollins), Paperback, 190 pp
- 1966, Ulverscroft Large-print Edition, Hardcover, 219 pp

The book was first serialised in the US in The Saturday Evening Post in seven parts from 19 November (Volume 211, Number 21) to 31 December 1938 (Volume 211, Number 27) under the title Easy to Kill with illustrations by Henry Raleigh. The UK serialisation was in twenty-three parts in the Daily Express from Tuesday, 10 January, to Friday, 3 February 1939, as Easy to Kill. All the instalments carried an illustration by "Prescott". This version did not contain any chapter divisions.

== Film, TV, theatrical or radio adaptations ==
=== 1982 ===
Adapted into a television film in the United States in 1982 with Bill Bixby (Luke), Lesley-Anne Down (Bridget), Olivia de Havilland (Honoria) and Helen Hayes (Lavinia). In this adaptation, Luke is not a retired policeman but a professor from MIT on vacation.

=== 1993 ===
Adapted for stage by Clive Exton, directed by Wyn Jones, and performed at the Duke of York's Theatre, London (23 February – 10 April 1993), starring Charlotte Attenborough, Peter Capaldi, Nigel Davenport, Irene Sutcliffe and Ian Thompson.

=== 2009 ===
A 2009 adaptation, with the inclusion of Miss Marple (played by Julia McKenzie), was included in the fourth series of Agatha Christie's Marple; it deviated significantly from the novel by removing some of the characters in it, while adding new ones and changing those left in. New subplots were introduced, along with darker themes including rape, incest and abortion, and the murderer's motive was changed:

- Miss Marple, not Luke, meets Lavinia Pinkerton on the train and learns from her of her suspicions about the village deaths and her plans to go to Scotland Yard.
- Pinkerton is killed in a fall down a London station escalator (about which Marple reads in the papers) rather than a hit-and-run, while en route to Scotland Yard.
- The first two victims – the village's vicar, and an elderly woman who made home remedies – die differently, the vicar being killed by the murderer's tampering with his beekeeper's mask, causing him to inhale deadly fumes when spraying, and the woman dying after consuming poisonous mushrooms slipped surreptitiously into the pot of stew simmering on her hob.
- Miss Marple meets Luke Fitzwilliam (played by Benedict Cumberbatch) in the village. He is not retired, but an active police detective, and is dealing with a deceased relative's property. Both recognise one another's investigative inclinations and work together to solve the murders.
- Gordon Whitfield and Giles Ellsworthy do not appear. As a result, Honoria was said to have been once engaged to Hugh Horton instead of Lord Whitfield.
- Two new subplots surround the murders, one involving a political campaign in the village, in which one of the candidates knew about the death of Honoria's brother and was blackmailed about it, while the other focuses on Bridget. Bridget is an American who arrives in the village in order to learn about the curious circumstances of her birth (she was found near the village in a basket set adrift on the river). In the novel, Bridget was already well established in the village and was actually engaged to Lord Easterfield/Whitfield, while Luke is the newest arrival to the village and arranges to come and investigate the mysterious deaths on the pretext of being Bridget's cousin.
- Amy Gibbs is made a relative of one of the victims (someone who in the episode is known as Florrie Gibbs), and lives with Honoria.
- Honoria Waynflete (played by Shirley Henderson) is shown as an equally disturbed but younger woman with a motive different from that given her in the original story. Her new motive for the murders is revealed to be a need to conceal the truth behind an incident between herself and her developmentally-disabled brother, who raped her after being given his first drink of whisky and taught 'the facts of life'. Honoria confesses to having abandoned her daughter to fate, setting her adrift in a basket on the same river into which, some months earlier, she pushed her brother to his death. When her long-lost child Bridget returns seeking answers, Honoria finds herself compelled to kill all those who know the truth about her actions.

=== 2013 ===
A BBC Radio 4 adaptation in three parts by Joy Wilkinson and directed by Mary Peate, with Patrick Baladi as Luke Fitzwilliam, Lydia Leonard as Bridget Conway, Michael Cochrane as Lord Whitfield, Marcia Warren as Honoria Waynflete, Marlene Sidaway as Miss Pinkerton and Patrick Brennan as Billy Bones/Rivers.

=== 2015 ===
The novel was adapted as a 2015 episode of the French television series Les Petits Meurtres d'Agatha Christie.

=== 2023 ===
In 2023 it was announced that a new BBC adaptation was to be made. The cast includes David Jonsson as Luke Obiako Fitzwilliam (in this version, a Nigerian attaché) along with Morfydd Clark, Penelope Wilton, Sinead Matthews, Tom Riley, Douglas Henshall, Mathew Baynton and Mark Bonnar. It aired in two episodes on 27 and 28 December 2023.
