= (I Wanna Give You) Devotion =

1990 single by Nomad

Single by Nomad featuring MC Mikee Freedom

from the album Changing Cabins
- Released: 1990
- Genre: Hip house
- Length: 4:09; 6:46
- Label: Rumour
- Songwriters: Damon Rochefort; Steve McCutcheon; MC Mikee Freedom
- Producer: Damon Rochefort

Nomad singles chronology
"The Raggamuffin Number" (1990)	"(I Wanna Give You) Devotion" (1990)	"Just a Groove" (1991)

"(I Wanna Give You) Devotion" is a song by English electronic group Nomad, released in 1990 by Rumour Records. It was the second single from their only album, Changing Cabins, released later in 1991. It was written by the producer, Damon Rochefort, with Steve Mac and MC Mikee Freedom. The song was a number-one hit in Greece and a top-five hit in the UK, where it reached number two. In the US, it peaked at number one on the Billboard Dance Club Play chart in June 1991. Its accompanying music video was directed by Jerome Redfarn. MTV Dance ranked the song number 32 in their list of "The 100 Biggest 90s Dance Anthems of All Time" in November 2011.

== Background and release ==
The track was produced by Damon Rochefort, who also shares writing credits with fellow Nomad member Steve McCutcheon and rapper MC Mikee Freedom. It also quotes from the earlier club hit "Devotion" by Ten City. Although Freedom and singer Sharon Dee Clarke were the featured artists on this track when it was released in the United Kingdom and other territories (even though Freedom was the only one to get his name credited), they were listed as uncredited in the US single version up until the act's full-length CD, Changing Cabins, was released Stateside in the autumn of 1991.

The song is notable for being the first song that Steve Mac ever wrote. When asked about the track and its success in an April 2010 interview, Mac said:

It was a real accident. I just remember struggling to get the drums right - I didn’t really know how to work the sequencer properly. I didn’t have that much knowledge of what I was doing, and I think if I had then it wouldn’t have been as good a track. I love the naiveté of what I was doing back then, and I miss that a little bit now.

In addition to the rap version, there is also a Soul Mix version that features Clarke's vocal performance without the rap. Both versions along with the Italo house version are included on the Changing Cabins CD.

== Critical reception ==
AllMusic editor Stewart Mason named the song a "terrific dance club staple", complimenting singer Sharon Dee Clarke's "soulful, expressive voice", and writer/programmer Damon Rochefort, that gives the whole thing a "perky, bouncy feel". David Taylor-Wilson from Bay Area Reporter felt it's "extremely enticing", praising Clarke's vocals as "superb". American magazine Billboard stated that the song had recently topped dance charts "thanks to Sharon Dee Clark's belting vocals and Damon Rochefort's savvy beat and melody construction." Billboard editor Larry Flick complimented its "contagious melody, a slammin' groove, and a well-timed trade-off between rapid male rapping and diva-styled femme singing."

Zane from Melody Maker stated, "The song's irritatingly catchy sax samples and the ubiquitous female soul vocals made it a deserved, if obvious, Top Five hit." James Hamilton from Music Week's RM Dance Update deemed it a "catchily honking political lurcher" in his weekly dance column. Phil Cheeseman from Record Mirror wrote, "If you went out clubbing on New Year's Eve, one record you'll almost certainly have heard is Nomad's 'Devotion'. Its crowd chants, stabbing saxophone, lazy strings and catchy chorus conspired to make it the Christmas period's most guaranteed floor filler." Johnny Dee from Smash Hits declared the track as "utterlly brill". Bob Mack from Spin named it a "great" dance cut and almost a "real song".

== Chart performance ==
"(I Wanna Give You) Devotion" peaked at number one in Greece. In the UK, it reached number two during its seventh week on the UK Singles Chart, on 17 February 1991. On the UK Dance Singles Chart, it reached number one, as well as on the Record Mirror Club Chart. The song entered the top 10 in Austria, Belgium, Ireland, Luxembourg, the Netherlands, Spain and Switzerland, as well as on the Eurochart Hot 100, where it peaked at number six in March 1991. Additionally, the song was a top-20 hit in Germany and Sweden. Outside Europe, it peaked at number one on the US Billboard Dance Club Play chart, number three on the Canadian RPM Dance chart and number 37 in Australia. In West Asia, the song became a top-10 hit also in Israel, peaking at number three in its sixth week on the chart, on 24 March 1991. It spent eight weeks inside the Israeli top 30. "(I Wanna Give You) Devotion" earned a silver record in the UK, denoting shipments of 200,000 copies.

== Music video ==
The music video for "(I Wanna Give You) Devotion" was directed by Jerome Redfarn. It features both MC Mikee Freedom and Sharon Dee Clarke, and have them dressed in body paint while they are performing the song at a rave concert. The video received heavy rotation on MTV Europe in March 1991.

== Impact and legacy ==
MTV Dance ranked "(I Wanna Give You) Devotion" number 32 in their list of "The 100 Biggest 90s Dance Anthems of All Time" in November 2011. PopMatters included it in their list of "15 Landmark Dance Tracks of 1991" in 2020.

== Track listings ==
- 12-inch CD (UK)
1. "(I Wanna Give You) Devotion" – 6:42
2. "(I Wanna Give You) Devotion" (Instrumental Mix) – 6:42
3. "Sang - Froid" – 3:32
- 12-inch maxi CD (UK/US)
1. "(I Wanna Give You) Devotion" (7" Mix) – 4:09
2. "(I Wanna Give You) Devotion" (Original Mix) – 6:46
3. "(I Wanna Give You) Devotion" (Instrumental) – 6:37
4. "(I Wanna Give You) Devotion" (Soul Mix) – 5:00
5. "(I Wanna Give You) Devotion" (The Joey Negro Mix) – 6:48
6. "(I Wanna Give You) Devotion" (Rock Shock Mix) – 6:39
7. "(I Wanna Give You) Devotion" (Trouble's Club Mix) – 6:41
8. "(I Wanna Give You) Devotion" (Trouble's Underground Club Mix) – 6:37

== Charts ==
=== Weekly charts ===
Chart (1991)	Peak position
Australia (ARIA)	37
Austria (Ö3 Austria Top 40)	10
Belgium (Ultratop 50 Flanders)	8
Canada Dance/Urban (RPM)	3
Europe (Eurochart Hot 100)	6
Europe (European Hit Radio)	17
Germany (GfK)	13
Greece (IFPI)	1
Ireland (IRMA)	10
Israel (Israeli Singles Chart)	3
Luxembourg (Radio Luxembourg)	2
Netherlands (Dutch Top 40)	5
Netherlands (Single Top 100)	5
Quebec (ADISQ)	48
Spain (AFYVE)	5
Sweden (Sverigetopplistan)	11
Switzerland (Schweizer Hitparade)	6
UK Singles (Official Charts)	2
UK Airplay (Music Week)	22
UK Dance (Music Week)	1
UK Indie (Music Week)	1
UK Club Chart (Record Mirror)	1
US 12-inch Singles Sales (Billboard)	21
US Dance Club Play (Billboard)	1

Chart (1995)	Peak position
Scottish Singles Sales (Official Charts)	43
UK Singles (Official Charts)	42
UK Dance (Official Charts)	14

=== Year-end charts ===
Chart (1990)	Position
UK Club Chart (Record Mirror)	99

Chart (1991)	Position
Belgium (Ultratop)	45
Canada Dance/Urban (RPM)	24
Europe (Eurochart Hot 100)	36
Germany (Media Control)	71
Netherlands (Dutch Top 40)	35
Netherlands (Single Top 100)	41
Sweden (Topplistan)	68
UK Singles (OCC)	23
UK Club Chart (Record Mirror)	2
US Dance Club Play (Billboard)	23

== Certifications ==
Region	Certification	Certified units/sales
United Kingdom (BPI)	Silver	200,000^{^}
^{^} Shipments figures based on certification alone.

== Release history ==
Region	Date	Format(s)	Label(s)	Ref(s).
United Kingdom	1990	—N/a	Rumour	
United Kingdom (re-release)	21 January 1991	7-inch vinyl; 12-inch vinyl; CD	Rumour	
Australia	25 March 1991	7-inch vinyl; 12-inch vinyl; cassette	Possum	
Japan	21 June 1991	Mini-CD; mini maxi-CD	Alfa International	
Australia	24 June 1991	CD	Possum	
Japan	21 July 1991	Maxi-CD	Alfa International	
