= Rags (musical) =

1986 musical by Charles Strouse and Stephen Schwartz

- Studio Recording
- Music: Charles Strouse
- Lyrics: Stephen Schwartz
- Book: Joseph Stein; David Thompson (revisions)
- Productions: 1986 Broadway; 1999 New Jersey; 2017 Connecticut; 2019 Manchester; 2020 London

Rags is a musical with a book by Joseph Stein (with revisions by David Thompson), lyrics by Stephen Schwartz, and music by Charles Strouse.

== Production history ==
The Broadway production opened on August 21, 1986, at the Mark Hellinger Theatre with little advance sale and to mostly indifferent reviews, and it closed after only four performances (and 18 previews). Directed by Gene Saks and choreographed by Ron Field, the cast included Teresa Stratas as Rebecca Hershkowitz, Larry Kert as Nathan Hershkowitz, Lonny Price as Ben, Judy Kuhn as Bella Cohen, Dick Latessa as Avram Cohen, Marcia Lewis as Rachel Halpern, and Terrence Mann as Saul, a trade union organizer. Despite its failure, it garnered a good deal of attention during the awards season, receiving Tony Award nominations for Best Musical, among others.

In 1991, Sony released a studio recording of the score. It featured most of the original cast joined by Julia Migenes replacing Stratas.

=== Revised versions ===
The creators reunited to present a dramatically rewritten and severely streamlined production at The American Jewish Theatre, New York City, which opened on December 2, 1991, directed by Richard Sabellico. This version had 9 actors playing all of the roles, featuring Ann Crumb as Rebecca and Crista Moore as Bella, and a reduced set, with two pushcarts on stage and imaginary windows, with the actors describing the exterior activity. The young immigrant mother has a best friend of almost equal importance, and the story is now told by David, the heroine's young son.

The Colony Theatre Company, Los Angeles, California presented Rags in 1993.

They reworked the show again, staging it first at Florida's Coconut Grove Playhouse (February 1999) and then the Paper Mill Playhouse in New Jersey in November 1999. The revised version cut the cast to 15, from the original Broadway cast of 30. According to Strouse, "We tried to do too much. And now it's tightened, more focused. People got lost in it... The diffuse, scattered story now centers on Rebecca Hershkowitz, a young immigrant mother who escapes to the Lower East Side after a pogrom, and her love affair with Saul, an American labor organizer trying to unionize the sweatshop where she works... The [original] score was influenced by Middle Eastern, Irish, Scottish, English folk, American honky-tonk, obviously jazz and ragtime and klezmer – even Greek music of that day, and Broadway, too... It is now 'more impressionistic'."

In 2006, Schwartz, Stein and Strouse collaborated on the World AIDS Day Concert version of the musical, celebrating the 20th Anniversary of the show's Broadway opening. The concert was at Times Square's Nokia Theatre and featured Carolee Carmello, Gregg Edelman, Eden Espinosa, Lainie Kazan and Michael Rupert.

The Goodspeed Opera House presented an extensive revisal of the show in 2017, which started previews on October 6, opened on October 25, and closed on December 10. The musical has a new book by David Thompson, several new songs by Schwartz and Strouse, and starred Samantha Massell as Rebecca Hershkowitz. Entirely reimagined, this new Rags has a new plot and new characters and is directed by Rob Ruggiero. The broadwayworld.com reviewer wrote: "They [Goodspeed] have taken a show that many had written off as, simply, one of those shows that just didn't work, and they pulled it apart and put it back together as a fresh, vibrant, timely and important story. I fully expect that this will become the definitive telling of this story, and it should."

=== Hope Mill Theatre ===
The UK premiere of the revised version of Rags was produced at Manchester's Hope Mill Theatre, playing from March 2 to April 6, 2019. The production was directed by Bronagh Lagan and starred Rebecca Trehearn as Rebecca, Valda Aviks as Rachel, Gavin James as Bonfman, Sam Peggs as Ben, Jane Quinn as Anna, Michael S. Siegel as Avram, Robert Tripolino as Sal, Tim Walton as Jack, Lydia White as Bella. James Dangerfield, Emma Fraser, James Hastings and Hanna Khogali were members of the ensemble as well as being an on-stage band. The role of David was shared between George Varley and Lochlan White. This production at the Hope Mill Theatre was Co-produced by Hope Mill Theatre and Aria Entertainment with association of Knockhardy Productions. The London transfer of this production opened at the Park Theatre, London on January 9, 2020.

== Plot ==
The following synopsis applies to the rewritten production (not the most recent Goodspeed version) and not the show that originally appeared on Broadway. As such, some musical numbers and subplots are not accounted for.

=== Act One ===
As a ship bearing hopeful immigrants steams toward Ellis Island, a lone passenger reflects on the life he has left behind ("I Remember"). Rebecca Hershkowitz, a Jewish woman, has fled Russia with her young son David, hoping to find her husband, Nathan, who left for America years before and never wrote back to his family. Rebecca has made friends with Bella Cohen, a teenager emigrating to America with her father Avram ("If We Never Meet Again"); her brother Herschel remains behind in Russia. Bella has fallen in love with Ben, another passenger, but Avram does not approve.

On Ellis Island, the unfeeling immigration officials treat the immigrants like animals ("Greenhorns"). With no male relative to claim them, Rebecca and David are in danger of immediate deportation until Bella begs Avram to rescue her friend. Avram pretends that Rebecca is his niece, and persuades his brother, who lives in a tenement on the Lower East Side of Manhattan to let Rebecca and David stay for the night. Bella, Rebecca and David marvel at the strange new sights in the streets below ("Brand New World"). Rebecca still feels lonely, and wishes that she can give her son a real home ("Children of The Wind").

Rebecca searches for her husband and takes a job sewing in a sweatshop, while David helps Rachel, a widow, selling trinkets out of her market stall. Bella works at home as a seamstress; confined to the tenement, she pines for Ben. Ben pretended that he had a wealthy uncle who would provide for him, but in reality, he has no uncle and works in a cigar factory. Avram, though an educated man in "the old country," hawks goods as a street vendor. Even so, the new immigrants remain upbeat ("Penny A Tune"). However, the business owners in the neighborhood are preyed upon by Mr. Rosen, a greedy man who demands they pay him for protection from his thugs.

Saul, a union supporter, confronts Rebecca, urging her to open her eyes to her poor treatment and unfair wages; he suggests that she better herself through education. Saul teaches Rebecca and David how to speak English, and tries to instill American values in them ("Easy For You"). To broaden their horizons, he takes them to see Hamlet as performed by a Jewish theatre troupe ("Hard To Be A Prince"). Rebecca realizes that she is falling in love with Saul ("Blame It On The Summer Night").

Ben comes to visit Bella, and admits he is only a factory worker. He has a new plan, to sell gramophones, and demonstrates one for her ("For My Mary"). As they dance, Avram returns and throws Ben out, forbidding Bella from ever seeing the boy again. Bella flies into a rage and accuses her father of not allowing her to achieve her own American dream ("Rags").

Meanwhile, Nathan, Rebecca's husband, is contemplating his position in the ranks of Tammany Hall, where he is promised great things if he manages to secure the Jewish vote for an anti-union Democratic candidate ("What's Wrong With That?"). He believes his wife is still in Russia until he discovers that she has placed an ad in the paper seeking him.

At the street market, Mr. Rosen comes to collect his bribes from the shopkeepers. Emboldened by the Socialist doctrine Saul has taught him, David stands up for Rachel and is beaten by Rosen's thugs. Rebecca blames Saul for corrupting her son and vows that she won't be fooled by any more idealistic notions of America. Nathan suddenly arrives to collect his wife and son ("Nothing Will Hurt Us Again").

=== Act Two ===
Nathan explains to Rebecca and David how he has managed to climb up from the ghetto of the lower East side to a better life ("Yankee Boy"). Rebecca is unsettled that her husband has given himself the American name "Nat Harris" and distances himself from the Jewish community; however, she also likes the idea of having a better life for her son ("Uptown"). She also longs for Saul, though they both realize their love can never be ("Wanting").

Avram and Rachel have fallen in love, enabling Avram to move out of his brother's house and provide Bella with a more stable family life ("Three Sunny Rooms"). Bella and David help Ben sell his "Magic Music Machine" to excited customers ("The Sound Of Love"). The three are natural salesmen, and Bella is delighted to think that soon they will have enough money to marry. To help out, she goes against her father's wishes and takes a job at the Triangle Shirtwaist Factory ("Rags" reprise).

Rebecca accompanies Nathan to a costume party and feels unhappy with her husband, who acts ashamed of her. When David interrupts the party to tell Rebecca of a fire at Bella's shop, Nathan forbids her to leave. Knowing Bella is in danger, she goes anyway, but it is too late. Bella has jumped to her death from the burning building. Avram is destroyed by the death of his daughter, and Rebecca is confused and guilty ("Kaddish").

Rebecca leads the sweatshop workers in a strike protesting the unsafe conditions that led to the deaths of the girls at the Triangle Shirtwaist Factory ("Bread and Freedom"). As the demonstration reaches near-riot levels, Nathan shows up to try to persuade his wife to come home with him. Rebecca sees Saul in the crowd and knows she must follow her heart and stand up for what is right ("Dancing With The Fools"). She refuses Nathan.

Avram is still grieving for Bella and is planning to return to Russia and the son, Herschel, he left behind when Ben comes to pay his respects. He tells Avram that leaving America would mean Bella died for nothing and gives him the gramophone, which plays a recording of Bella's voice. While Rebecca sings of her new life with Saul and David, Rachel and Avram welcome Herschel off the boat as a new wave of immigrants arrives ("Children of The Wind reprise/Finale").

== Song list ==
=== Original production ===
Act I

- Overture/I Remember - Homesick Immigrant
- Greenhorns - Americans and New Immigrants
- Brand New World - Rebecca and David
- Children of the Wind - Rebecca, Avram, and David
- Penny a Tune - Rachel, Klezmorim, Peddlers, and Workers
- Easy for You - Saul, Rebecca, and David
- Hard To Be a Prince - Hamlet and Company
- Blame It on the Summer Night - Rebecca
- For My Mary - Irish Tenor and Ben
- Rags - Bella and Avram
- What's Wrong with That? - Frankie, Mike, "Big Tim", and Nathan
- On the Fourth Day of July*^ - Picnickers and Band
- In America*^ - Rebecca and Nathan
Act II
- Entr'acte
- Yankee Boy** - Nathan and Neighbors
- Uptown - Nathan and Rebecca
- Wanting - Rebecca and Saul
- Three Sunny Rooms - Rachel and Avram
- The Sound of Love - Ben, David, and Shoppers
- For My Mary (Reprise) - Bella and Ben
- Democratic Club Dance* - Rebecca, "Big Tim", Nathan, Mike, Mrs. Sullivan, Democrats, and Band
- Kaddish - Avram, Rebecca, and Men
- Bread and Freedom - Rosa, Rebecca, Esther, and Sam
- Dancing With the Fools - Rebecca, Nathan, and Strikers
- Finale - Rebecca, David, Americans, and New Immigrants

Songs marked with an (*) are not included on the Cast Recording. Songs marked with a (^) are not consistently included in later versions of the musical.

**This song was originally scripted to be sung by Ben almost immediately after "If We Never Meet Again" (and still remains so in some publications), however it was changed for the original Broadway production.

=== Hope Mill Theatre production ===
Act I
- Prologue - Company
- If We Never Meet Again - Rebecca and Bella
- Greenhorns - Americans
- Brand New World - Rebecca, David, Avram, and Bella
- Edge of a Knife - Rebecca
- Fabric of America - Jack, Ben, Bella, Rebecca, and Anna
- Penny a Tune - Musicians
- Greenhorns (Reprise) - Americans
- Bella's Song (A Pretty Girl) - Ben
- Meet an Italian - Sal
- Shabbos/Latin Mass - Company
- If We Never Meet Again/Edge of a Knife (Reprise) - Rebecca
- Bella's Song (Reprise) - Ben
- Little Lady - Bronfman and Rebecca
- It's Hard to be a Prince - Hamlet and Company
- Citizens Awake - Americans
- Blame It on the Summer Night - Rebecca and Sal
- For My Mary - Irish Tenor and Ben
- Take Our Country Back - Americans
- Rags - Rebecca and Bella
Act II
- Entr' Acte
- On the Fourth Day of July - Americans
- Yankee Boy - Ben and Company
- Uptown - Bronfman and Rebecca
- Bread and Freedom - Rebecca and Company
- Wanting - Rebecca and Sal
- Bella's Song (Reprise) - Ben
- Rags (Reprise) - Rebecca
- Three Sunny Rooms - Rachel, Avram, Bella, and Ben
- Shabbos (Reprise) - Company
- Kaddish - Avram, Rebecca, and Company
- Bella's Song (Reprise) - Ben
- If We Never Meet Again (Reprise) - Rebecca
- Bread and Freedom (Reprise) - Company
- Children of the Wind - Rebecca
- Finale - Company

== Characters ==
Character	Original Broadway (1986)	Paper Mill Playhouse (1999)	American Jewish Theatre (2001)	Goodspeed (2017)	Hope Mill Theatre (2019)	Park Theatre (2020)	Classic Stage Company (2026)
Rebecca Hershkowitz	Teresa Stratas	Marilyn Caskey	Ann Crumb	Samantha Massell	Rebecca Trehearn	Carolyn Maitland	Julie Benko
David Hershkowitz	Josh Blake	Jonathan Andrew Bleicher	Jonathan C. Kaplan	Christian Michael Camporin	George Varley Lochlan White	Samuel Jones Jude Muir	Reece Boyle
Nathan Hershkowitz	Larry Kert	Wayne LeGette	David Pevzner				
Saul (Changed to Sal Russo)	Terrence Mann	Raymond McLeod		Sean MacLaughlin	Robert Tripolino	Alex Gibson-Giorgio	Rodd Cyrus
Bella Cohen	Judy Kuhn	Kathryn Quinlan	Crista Moore	Sara Kapner	Lydia White	Martha Kirby	Jenna Lea Rosen
Avram Cohen	Dick Latessa	Christopher Bishop	Phillip Hoffman	Adam Heller	Michael S. Siegel	Dave Willetts	Steven Skybell
Ben Levitowitz	Lonny Price	Caesar Samayoa	Alec Timmerman	Nathan Salstone	Sam Peggs	Oisin Nolan-Power	Nicholas Barasch
Rachel Brodsky	Marcia Lewis		Jan Neuberger	Lori Wilner	Valda Aviks	Rachel Izen	Judy Kuhn
Anna Blumberg	Evelyn Baron		Rachel Black	Emily Zacharias	Jane Quinn	Debbie Chazen	Jill Abramovitz
Jack Blumberg	Mordecai Lawner			Mitch Greenberg	Tim Walton	Jeremy Rose	Adam Heller
Max Bronfman				David Harris	Gavin James	Sam Attwater	Michael McCorry Rose

== Awards and nominations ==
=== Original Broadway production ===
Year	Award	Category	Nominee	Result
1987	Tony Award	Best Musical		Nominated
1987	Tony Award	Best Book of a Musical	Joseph Stein	Nominated
1987	Tony Award	Best Original Score	Charles Strouse and Stephen Schwartz	Nominated
1987	Tony Award	Best Performance by a Leading Actress in a Musical	Teresa Stratas	Nominated
1987	Tony Award	Best Choreography	Ron Field	Nominated
1987	Drama Desk Award	Outstanding Actress in a Musical	Teresa Stratas	Won
1987	Drama Desk Award	Outstanding Featured Actress in a Musical	Judy Kuhn	Nominated
1987	Drama Desk Award	Outstanding Featured Actress in a Musical	Marcia Lewis	Nominated
1987	Drama Desk Award	Outstanding Orchestrations	Michael Starobin	Nominated
1987	Drama Desk Award	Outstanding Music	Charles Strouse	Nominated
