= Tom Parsons (actor) =

Tom Parsons is a British stage actor and singer-songwriter. He did his acting training at Mountview Academy of Theatre Arts in London.

== Stage performances ==
Parsons is most noted for performing the roles of Trekkie Monster, Nicky and one of the Bad Idea Bears in Avenue Q in London's West End, from late 2009 until the show's closure in 2010. He performed in productions of Avenue Q at the Noël Coward Theatre, the Gielgud Theatre and the Wyndhams.

Previously he performed the role of Eddie and understudy of Sky in Mamma Mia! at the Prince of Wales Theatre.

In 2012, Parsons played Peter in Jesus Christ Superstar (Arena World Tour, including the UK and Australia) and was an original cast member in the 1st Arena Tour.

He played Mark in Monkee Business, directed by David Taylor at the Manchester Opera House.

For the Tony-award-winning musical Once, Parsons played the lead role of Guy at the Princess Theatre in Melbourne, and again in 2015 at the Olympia Theatre in Dublin.
