= Lydia White (actress) =

Actress and singer

- Born: Lydia Suzanne White; 1997 (age 28–29)
- Education: Royal Conservatoire of Scotland
- Years active: 2018–present
- Website: www.lydiawhitesinging.com

Lydia Suzanne White (born 1997) is an English actress, singer, and vocal coach. She is known for her work in musical theatre.

== Early life ==
White was born in the East London Borough of Waltham Forest and grew up in Saffron Walden, Essex. Her grandmother was a Czech Jewish Kindertransport refugee born in Brno. White attended Saffron Walden County High School and then completed her A Levels at Hills Road Sixth Form College in Cambridge. She also took a weekend West End Masterclass. In 2015, White was a finalist in the Stephen Sondheim Society Student Performer of the Year competition. She earned an Andrew Lloyd Webber Foundation scholarship to study at the Royal Conservatoire of Scotland, graduating in 2018 with a Bachelor of Arts in Musical Theatre.

== Career ==
White made her television debut in an episode of the BBC Three series Clique in 2018. This was followed by her professional stage debut in 2019 as Bella in the UK premiere of the musical Rags at the Hope Mill Theatre in Manchester, working with Bronagh Lagan. She also appeared in CinderELLA at the Nuffield Theatre, Southampton. She was then an understudy for Molly Lynch's Cathy in The Last Five Years at Southwark Playhouse in early 2020.

In 2021, White starred as Jo March in the UK premiere of the Little Women musical adaptation at the Park Theatre in London, reuniting with Bronagh Lagan alongside Hana Ichijo, Anastasia Martin, and Mary Moore as the other March sisters. In 2022, she appeared in Whistle Down the Wind at the Watermill Theatre and A Christmas Carol at the Old Vic. In 2023, she joined the West End cast of Matilda the Musical at the Cambridge Theatre as Miss Honey.

== Filmography ==
Year	Title	Role	Notes
2018	Clique	Jen	1 episode
2022	Falklands: Island of Secrets		Documentary

== Stage ==
Year	Title	Role	Notes
2019	Rags	Bella	Hope Mill Theatre, Manchester
2019	CinderELLA	Cinders	Nuffield Theatre, Southampton
2020	The Last Five Years	Cathy (understudy)	Southwark Playhouse, London
2021	Little Women	Jo March	Park Theatre, London
2022	Whistle Down the Wind	Swallow	Watermill Theatre, Newbury
2022	A Christmas Carol	Belle	Old Vic, London
2023	Matilda the Musical	Miss Honey	Cambridge Theatre, London
2025	Girl from the North Country	Katherine Draper	Old Vic, London
2026	Once	Girl	Pitlochry Festival Theatre, Pitlochry
