= Saffron Walden County High School =

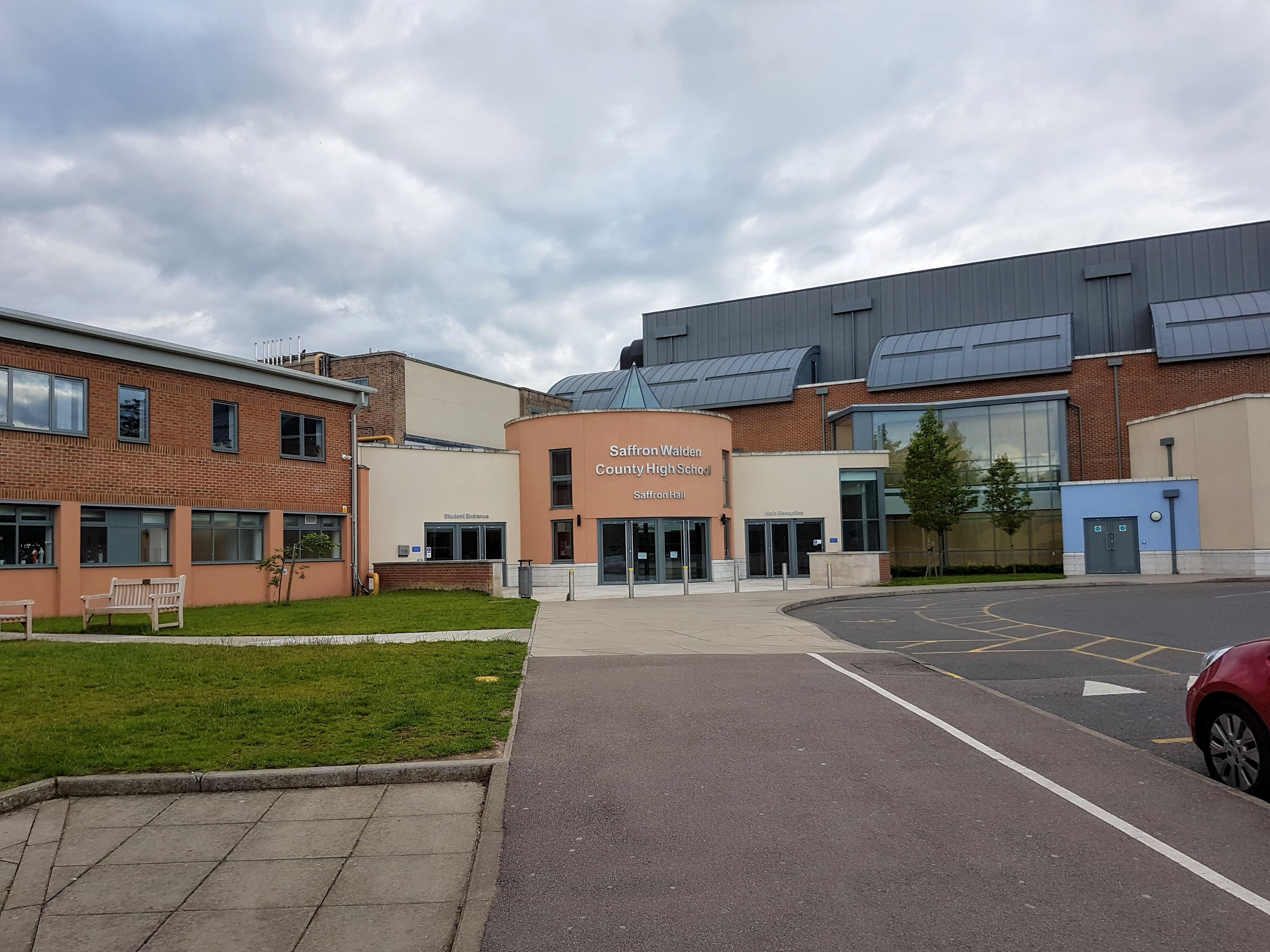

Location
- Audley End Road; Saffron Walden, Essex, CB11 4UH; England; 52°01′02″N 0°13′55″E

Information
- Type: Academy
- Motto: A local school of exceptional quality
- Established: 1950; 76 years ago (As Saffron Walden Technical and Modern)
- Local authority: Essex
- Trust: Saffron Academy Trust
- Department for Education URN: 136776 Tables
- Ofsted: Reports
- Head teacher: Polly Lankester (2020-present)
- Staff: c. 350
- Gender: Co-educational
- Age: 11 (Year 7) to 18 (Year 13)
- Enrolment: c. 2300
- Houses: Saffron and Walden (2004-present); Scott, Shaw, Elgar and Baird (1964-2004)
- Colour
- Publication: Switch On
- Website: http://www.swchs.net/

Saffron Walden County High School (SWCHS) is a coeducational academy school for ages 11–18 in Saffron Walden, Essex, England. The school is also an accredited training school, and was formerly a specialist Technology College. The current executive headteacher is Caroline Derbyshire (following the departure of John Hartley) and the associate headteacher is Polly Lankester.

The 2018 Sunday Times School Guide ranked the school as the best non-selective state school in East Anglia.

== History ==
The school was formed in 1950 as the Saffron Walden Technical and Modern School, a bilateral school. In the 1960s, there were two nearby grammar schools, the Friends' School, Saffron Walden, for boys, and The Hertfordshire and Essex High School, for girls.

Wallace Heyes, the headteacher from 1951, in 1963 wanted to change the school to the current name. The school name changed in September 1964. In early June 1966 the West Essex Education Executive decided that the local area would go comprehensive. The town had struggled for enough grammar school places for some years. It was planned to make the school into an all female 8-form comprehensive school.

On Tuesday 4 April 1967 Essex County Council approved the change to become a co-educational comprehensive in September 1967.

== Facilities ==
=== Halls ===
In November 2013, the school opened a new "world-class" concert hall dubbed Saffron Hall. The £10m auditorium was funded by the Yellow Car Charitable Trust and replaced the previous main school hall. Saffron Hall won the Project of the Year award at the Royal Institution of Chartered Surveyors East of England Awards 2014.

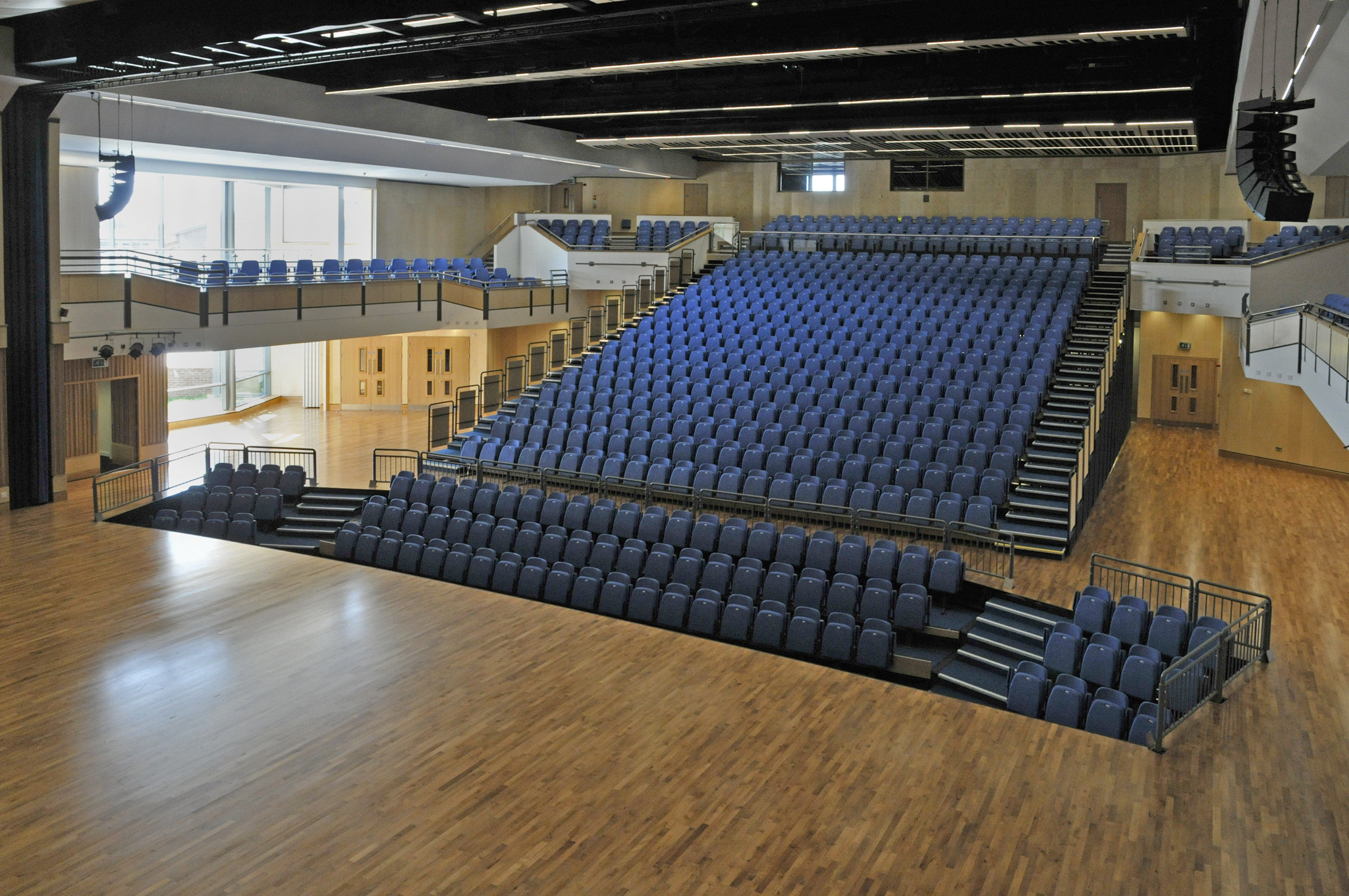
Saffron Hall concert hall

The only cinema in Saffron Walden has operated within the school since 2006. It is a not-for-profit cinema run by volunteer projectionists using both digital projectors and 35mm film. Both Saffron Screen and Saffron Hall are open to the public outside of school hours and used by the school otherwise.

== Notable alumni ==
- Ben Maher, show jumper
- Iain Dale, Broadcaster
- Lydia White, actress and singer
