= Murder Is Easy (TV series) =

2023 British television drama

- Genre: Mystery; Drama; Thriller
- Based on: Murder Is Easy by Agatha Christie
- Written by: Siân Ejiwunmi-Le Berre
- Directed by: Meenu Gaur
- Starring: David Jonsson; Penelope Wilton; Morfydd Clark
- Music by: Segun Akinola
- Country of origin: United Kingdom
- Original language: English
- No. of episodes: 2

Production
- Executive producers: Sian Ejiwunmi-Le Berre; James Prichard; James Gandhi; Damien Timmer; Danielle Scott-Haughton; Reemah Sakaan; Stephen Nye
- Producer: Karen Kelly
- Production companies: Agatha Christie Limited; Mammoth Screen

Original release
- Network: BBC One; BritBox International
- Release: 27 December – 28 December 2023

Murder Is Easy is a British two-part mystery thriller television serial. It is based on the 1939 Agatha Christie novel of the same name. It is adapted by Siân Ejiwunmi-Le Berre and directed by Meenu Gaur. It premiered on BBC One and BBC iPlayer on 27 December 2023.

== Premise ==
In 1954, Luke Obiako Fitzwilliam (Jonsson) is a Nigerian attaché on his way to Whitehall when he meets the mysterious Miss Lavinia Pinkerton (Wilton) on a train to London. Pinkerton discusses with him a series of deaths in the village of Wychwood-Under-Ashe which are not accidental and there's a killer on the loose. Later, Miss Pinkerton is killed in a hit-and-run, and Fitzwilliam steels himself to discover the murderer.

== Cast ==
- David Jonsson as Luke Obiako Fitzwilliam
- Morfydd Clark as Bridget Conway
- Penelope Wilton as Miss Lavinia Pinkerton
- Sinead Matthews as Miss Honoria Waynflete
- Tom Riley as Lord Whitfield
- Douglas Henshall as Major Horton
- Mathew Baynton as Dr Thomas
- Mark Bonnar as Reverend Arthur Humbleby
- Nimra Bucha as Mrs Humbleby
- Tamzin Outhwaite as Mrs Pierce
- Jon Pointing as Rivers
- Phoebe Licorish as Rose Humbleby
- Joe Fagan as the Butler
- Holly Howden Gilchrist as Amy Gibbs

== Episodes ==
No.	Episode	Directed by	Written by	Original release date	UK viewers (millions)
1	Episode 1	Meenu Gaur	Siân Ejiwunmi-Le Berre	27 December 2023	6.82
2	Episode 2	Meenu Gaur	Siân Ejiwunmi-Le Berre	28 December 2023	5.68

== Production ==
Produced by Mammoth Screen and Agatha Christie Limited, it was a co-commission between the BBC and BritBox International. The Agatha Christie novel of the same name is adapted by Siân Ejiwunmi-Le Berre and directed by Meenu Gaur. It was produced by Karen Kelly. Executive producers are Ejiwunmi-Le Berre, James Prichard for Agatha Christie Limited, James Gandhi and Damien Timmer for Mammoth Screen, Danielle Scott-Haughton for the BBC and Reemah Sakaan and Stephen Nye for BritBox International.

=== Locations ===
Murder Is Easy was filmed on location in Scotland in the summer of 2023 on the two-part drama series. First-look images from the production were released in November 2023.

Filming took place in Tyninghame (and especially the village hall and the Tyninghame Smithy cafe), Preston Mill in East Linton, Stirlingshire, Forbes Place in Paisley, Sorn Castle in Ayrshire, and Birkhill Station on the Bo’ness and Kinneil Railway.

Waterloo Station in London can be seen briefly as the train carrying Miss Lavinia Pinkerton and Luke Fitzwilliam approaches and enters Waterloo Station.

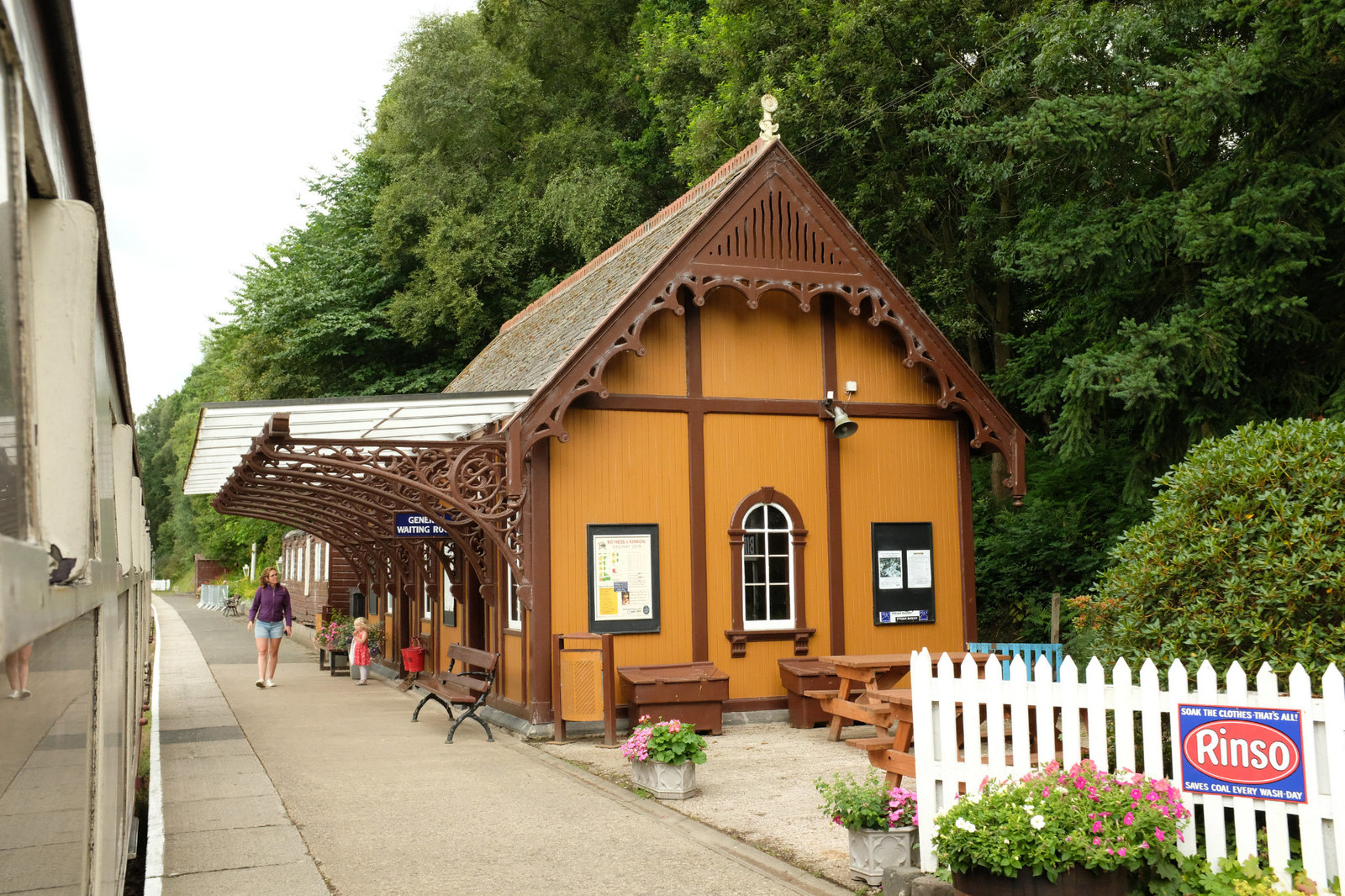
Birkhill Station

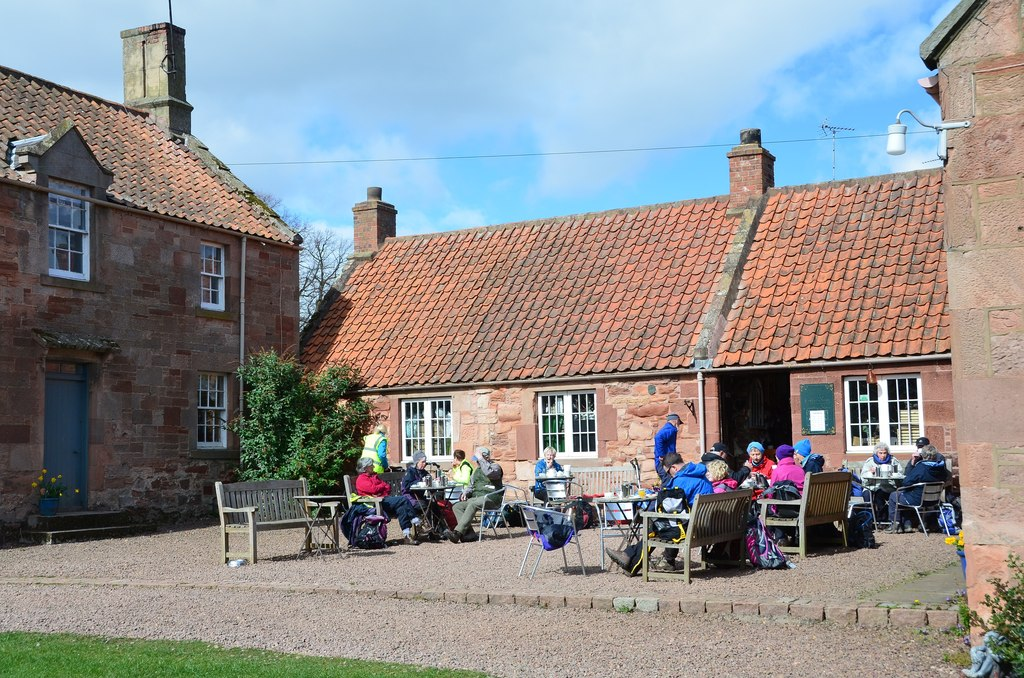
Tyninghame Smithy cafe

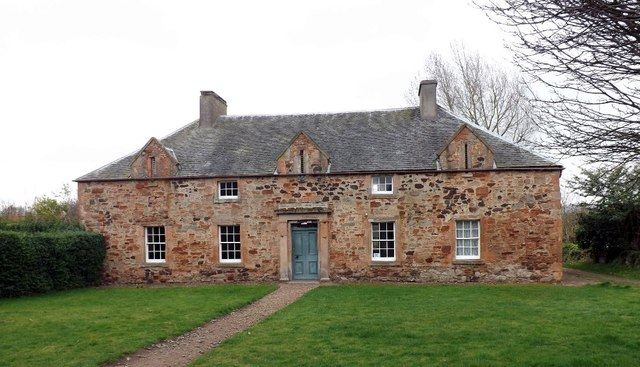
Tyninghame village hall

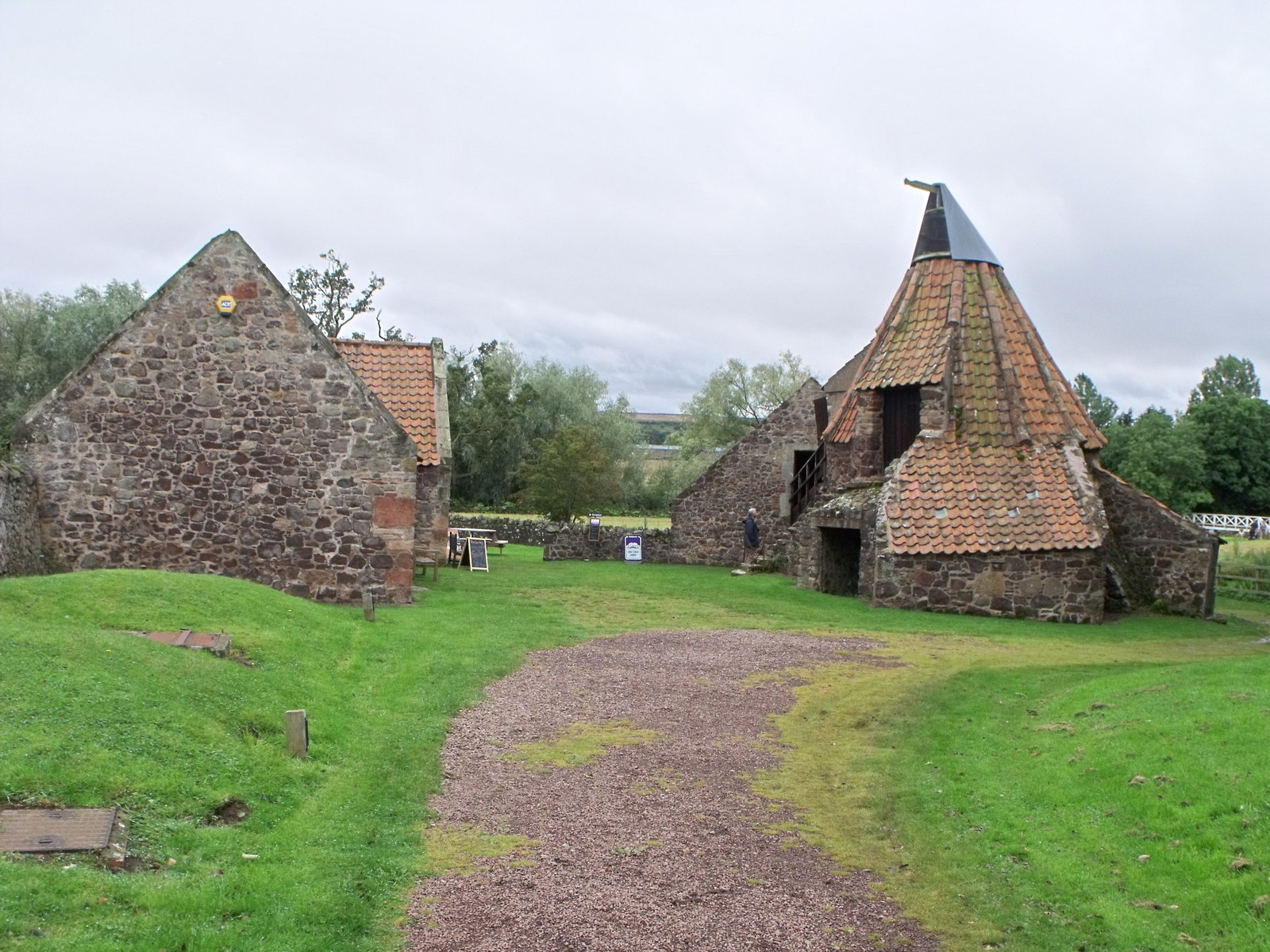
Preston Mill

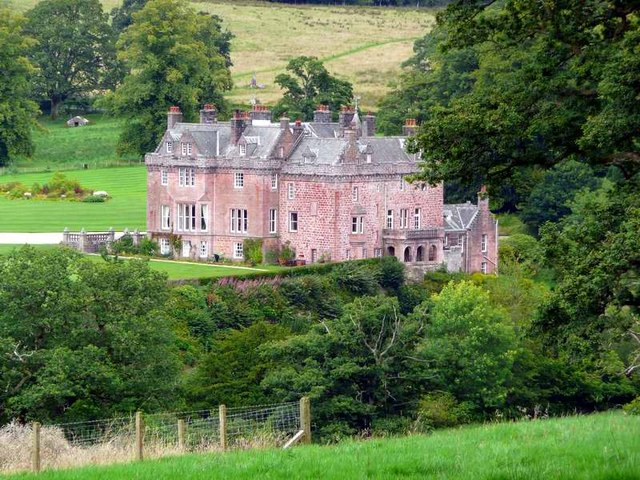
Sorn Castle

== Broadcast ==
The show aired on BBC One and BBC iPlayer in the UK on 27 December 2023 and will be broadcast on BritBox International in the US, Canada and South Africa.

== Reception ==
Rebecca Nicholson in The Guardian awarded it three out of five stars, praising its promising reworkings but finding the second episode unfocused, and that it "both overexplains and underexplains what is going on". Nick Hilton in The Independent awarded it two out of five stars.
