= Lola Griffin =

- Holby City character
- Sharon D. Clarke as Lola Griffin
- First appearance: "Patience"; 7 June 2005
- Last appearance: "The Burden of Proof"; 15 January 2019
- Portrayed by: Sharon D. Clarke
- Spinoff(s): HolbyBlue (2008)

In-universe information
- Occupation: Clinical Lead; Post Operative Care Consultant; (prev. Cardiothoracic Registrar)
- Family: Leo Griffin (step-son); Jess Griffin (step-daughter)
- Spouse: Ric Griffin
- Children: Cleo Griffin (daughter)

Lola Griffin (also Williams) is a fictional character from the BBC medical drama Holby City, played by actress Sharon D. Clarke. She first appeared in the series seven episode "Patience", broadcast on 7 June 2005. Lola is characterised as a "tough" female and "wisecracking earth mother". She was introduced into the series as the ex-wife of established character Ric Griffin (Hugh Quarshie). Clarke has praised the character's inclusion because she is a black woman with power, which she believed was a diverse and positive depiction. When the actress left the show in 2008, writers produced a standalone episode built around her exit. When Lola learns she is being made redundant, she takes a job at another hospital. Lola left in the episode titled "Mad World", which was broadcast on 14 October 2008. In December 2018, it was announced that Clarke had agreed to reprise the role and Lola appears for one episode in January 2019.

== Development ==
=== Characterisation ===
Lola's warm but tough, friendly but judgmental, a sensual yet wisecracking earth mother and one of the guys. Lola doesn’t mince her words, she wouldn’t know how. Underneath the Mother Hen exterior is a complicated mixture of steely resolve and massive soft-heartedness.

— An excerpt from Lola's profile on the official Holby City website.

Lola arrives at Holby City hospital to take the role of a new consultant. She is the ex-wife of established character Ric Griffin (Hugh Quarshie). BBC Online describes the pair as having "banter and competitiveness" formed from "years of familiarity and former intimacy". They added "get on the wrong side of her and you'll know about it." She is also characterised as a "feisty" woman who is "controlling yet compassionate".

As Holby City is a medical show, the actress had to learn much of the terminology spoken in the profession. Clarke wanted to understand most of it to make Lola appear authentic. She told a reporter from Metro that "if i'm saying quickly, in passing, I’ll just learn it phonetically, parrot fashion, and try to make it trip off the tongue like I’ve always said it." She also learned how to correctly perform a tension pneumothorax to aid her performance.

When she first arrives at the hospital Ric is annoyed at the prospect of working with her. He becomes stressed and decides to leave to work in Ghana. Quarshie told Graham Kibble-White from the Western Mail that his "larger-than-life ex-wife Lola has just rolled up in Holby and I think her appearance is the last straw for him, so he decides to take a job in Ghana."

Lola becomes involved in various storylines with Ric's family. When Ric's daughter Jess Griffin (Verona Joseph) objects to his engagement to Thandie Abebe-Griffin (Ginny Holder), she tries to involve Lola in the feud. This leads to Lola and Ric clashing, with him warning her to stay out of his personal life. The argument takes its toll on Lola and when she discusses hospital business with Lord Byrne (Ronald Pickup) she clutches her chest and collapses from a major heart attack. Her fellow colleagues then battle to save her life.

Another main story for Lola begins when a patient dies and Lola believes her baby daughter Leanne needs caring for. Lola incorrectly believes her father Steve Spence (Karl Haynes) is a drug addict. She takes Leanne home with her which gets her into trouble with Ric. Lola develops a bond with Leanne and she over invests in her care. Lola is later forced to let Leanne go and live with Steve. She later becomes concerned for Leanne's welfare and visits her home alongside Consultant Dan Clifford (Peter Wingfield). They hear Leanne crying and decide to break into the property where they find Steve unconscious. Steve dies and Lola is offered care of Leanne. She decides she cannot look after a child full time and have a career and lets Leanne go.

Producer's later began a rivalry between Lola and consultant Linden Cullen (Duncan Pow). Linden arrives to reshape the hospital's Acute Assessment Unit ward, which Lola had been running temporarily. A Daily Express writer observed that the pair end up "in a battle for supremacy" with nursing consultant Mark Williams (Robert Powell) caught in the middle of their feud.

In 2008, Lola and registrar Joseph Byrne (Luke Roberts) appear in the show's spin-off series HolbyBlue, they appear as witnesses after a patient is stabbed and Jac Naylor (Rosie Marcel) is arrested.

=== Departure ===
Clarke announced her departure during a live television interview on 22 May 2008. Lola was written out of the series later that year, departing in the episode titled "Mad World", which was broadcast on 14 October 2008. The show devised it as an entire standalone episode around the character's exit. Lola learns that she is going to be made redundant and takes a job at a private psychiatric hospital. Clarke told a reporter from the Birmingham Mail that her character would not leave "without getting her due". She receives a large payout and reveals she has secretly applied for another job with more power. She added "there's a company car, she's got her own office and there are massive grounds." In the episode Lola discovers her former colleague Abra Durant (Ade Edmondson) is a patient at the hospital. She investigates his case and convinces him to leave and regain control of his life. The job soon proves to be not what Lola had expected. She makes a decision to leave the area for good. Clarke concluded that "she's already been told she's there to dish out pills and not get involved. Lola's always been hands-on and, after an incident, she's reminded of what she loves."

Clarke was happy with her achievements on Holby City and being part of a diverse cast. She was particularly content with her character holding such power. She told Roz Laws (Birmingham Mail) that "When I started out in my acting career, I found I was always cast as a nurse. I was finally able to break out of that in Holby City, when I played Dr Lola Griffin and finally had some power. It was boundary-breaking, not casting black actors to push up quotas or push trolleys." She later reflected "I'm very proud to have had people come up to me and say that their daughter became a doctor because of Holby. I remember being on set one day and looking around and seeing six black women in the scene. Where else on screen was that going to happen?" She later described playing the character as one of her career highlights. The actress stated that she got a "positive reaction" from viewers and added that Lola was special because of "her strength as a black woman with authority".

=== Return ===
On 11 December 2018, it was announced that Clarke had reprised the role of Lola for one episode scheduled to air in January 2019. Lola's return coincides with the show's twentieth anniversary and Lola will interact with Ric. Of her return Clarke stated "I was very proud to bring her to life and be a part of the Holby family. I’m so excited to be treading the wards again, and seeing what Lola will be getting up to for Holby’s 20th Anniversary. Hey, Ric, Lola’s back in town!" Executive producer Simon Harper said that it was "a great coup for the show" to have Clarke back. He added "we couldn't let the anniversary pass without the appearance of one of Ric's many ex-wives to ruffle his feathers."

== Reception ==
For her portrayal of Lola, Clarke won the "Female Performance in TV" accolade at the 2007 Screen Nation Film and Television Awards. Mark Lawson from The Guardian branded the character "a powerful woman". Jane Simon from the Daily Mirror included Lola's exit episode in her "pick of the day" feature. She added that the episode gave Clarke a chance to showcase her singing skills. Simon later branded her "nice, grandmother-quoting Lola". An Inside Soap writer described Lola as a "much-loved" character and a Birmingham Mail writer branded her a "big-hearted medic".

Jon Wise from The People criticised Lola's heart attack story. He jibed "over at Holby City it's gone from emergency to panto in one flick of the surgeon's knife. Lola's heart attack was like something out of Prisoner Cell Block H - and Lola, left, looks like she's come from there as well. She looked more like she had indigestion from eating too many pies than cardiac problems." Sue Haasler writing for Metro branded Lola a "fabulous" character who she wished would return to the show permanently. She added that "there's something magical about Lola. Everybody loves her, and she has the ability to soothe even the most annoying patient."
