= Marcia Lewis =

American actress (1938 - 2010)

- Born: August 18, 1938; Melrose, Massachusetts, U.S.
- Died: December 21, 2010 (aged 72); Brentwood, Tennessee, U.S.
- Occupations: Nurse, actress, singer
- Years active: 1964–2006
- Spouse: Fred D. Bryan (2001–2010; her death)

Marcia Lewis (August 18, 1938 – December 21, 2010) was an American character actress and singer. She was nominated twice for the Tony Award as Best Featured Actress in a Musical (Chicago and Grease) and twice for the Drama Desk Award for Outstanding Featured Actress in a Musical (Chicago and Rags).

== Life and career ==
Lewis was born in Melrose, Massachusetts, and raised in Cincinnati, Ohio. She earned her RN from Jewish Hospital School of Nursing in Cincinnati in 1959 and worked as a registered nurse at the University of Cincinnati Hospital (Ohio) and Mount Sinai Hospital (NYC).

=== Stage and television ===
Lewis made her Broadway debut in the original production of Hello, Dolly!, taking over the role of Ernestina. Additional theater credits include The Time of Your Life (1969), Annie, taking over the role of Miss Hannigan in April 1981, Rags (1986) (nominee, Drama Desk Award, Outstanding Featured Actress in a Musical), Roza (1987), Orpheus Descending with Vanessa Redgrave (1989), and the 1990 revival of Fiddler on the Roof as Golde. Lewis appeared in the 1994 revival of Grease as Miss Lynch, and was nominated for the Tony Award, Best Featured Actress in a Musical. She appeared as the Matron in the 1996 revival of Chicago. For her work, she received nominations for the Tony Award, Best Featured Actress in a Musical and Drama Desk Award, Outstanding Featured Actress in a Musical.

She appeared at the Off-Broadway Theatre of the Zanies in An Impudent Wolf (1965), the Players Theatre in Who's Who Baby? (1968), and Playwrights Horizons in Romance Language in 1984 and When She Danced in 1990.

Lewis toured in Cabaret as Fraulein Schneider and appeared in Chicago at the Mandalay Bay hotel in Las Vegas, Nevada, for three months. Her television credits include guest appearances on The Bob Newhart Show (1975), Baretta (1975), The Bionic Woman (1976), Happy Days (1977, 1979), the TV movie When She Was Bad (1979) and Kate and Allie (1988).

=== Performing and personal life ===
As a singer, Lewis performed in most of the leading cabarets and supper clubs in Manhattan, including Rainbow & Stars, Upstairs at the Duplex, Upstairs at the Downstairs, Grande Finale, Reno Sweeney's, Freddy's Eighty-Eights, Town Hall, The Village Gate, and the Russian Tea Room. Lewis also appeared in concert at Carnegie Hall. Lewis' solo album Nowadays (1998), a collection of showtunes and standards recorded with the Mark Hummel Quartet, is available on the Original Cast Records label.

Lewis married her second husband, Fred D. Bryan, a Nashville financial adviser, on June 24, 2001. Lewis died on December 21, 2010, at her home in Brentwood, Tennessee, of cancer, aged 72. Bryan survived her.

== Stage ==
Year	Title	Role	Venue	Ref.
1965	An Impudent Wolf	Grandma	Off-Broadway, Theatre of the Zanies	
1966	Hello, Dolly!	Ernestina	Broadway, St. James Theatre	
1968	Who's Who Baby?	Performer	Off-Broadway, Players' Theatre	
1969	The Time of Your Life	Lorene	Broadway, Vivian Beaumont Theatre	
1981	Annie	Miss Hannigan	Broadway, Alvin Theatre	
1984	Romance Language	Emma Stebbins, Ellen Emerson, and a Dancehall Girl	Off-Broadway, Playwrights Horizons	
1986	Rags	Rachel Halpern	Broadway, Mark Hellinger Theatre	
1987	Roza	Madame Katz	Broadway, Royale Theatre	
1989	Orpheus Descending	Nurse Porter	Broadway, Neil Simon Theatre	
1990	Fiddler on the Roof	Golde	Broadway, Gershwin Theatre	
1990	When She Danced	Mary	Off-Broadway, Playwrights Horizons	
1994	Grease	Miss Lynch	Broadway, Eugene O'Neill Theatre	
1995	Big City Rhythm	Performer	Off-Broadway, Triad Theatre	
1996	Chicago	Matron 'Mama' Morton	Off-Broadway, New York City Center	
1996	Chicago	Matron 'Mama' Morton	Broadway, Richard Rodgers Theatre	
1997	Chicago	Matron 'Mama' Morton	U.S. National Tour	
2004	Annie	Miss Hannigan	U.S. National Tour	

== Awards and nominations ==
Award	Year	Category	Work	Result	Ref.
Tony Awards	1994	Best Featured Actress in a Musical	Grease	Nominated	
Tony Awards	1997	Best Featured Actress in a Musical	Chicago	Nominated	
Outer Critics Circle Awards	1997	Best Featured Actress in a Musical	Chicago	Nominated	
Drama Desk Awards	1987	Outstanding Featured Actress in a Musical	Rags	Nominated	
Drama Desk Awards	1997	Outstanding Featured Actress in a Musical	Chicago	Nominated	
