= Damon Rochefort =

Welsh musician, scriptwriter, and producer (born 1965)

Damon Alexis-Rochefort né Damon Rochefort (born 1965 in Cardiff, Wales) is a Welsh scriptwriter, songwriter and producer.

== Career ==
He has had success in music in the 1990s with his group Nomad, with the international hit "(I Wanna Give You) Devotion" and others as well as writing and producing hits for Kim Wilde, Bad Boys Inc, Michelle Gayle and La Toya Jackson. Prior to enjoying success with Nomad, Rochefort recorded "Don't Believe the Hype" under the name Mista E, an acid house single featuring a pre-fame Steve Coogan doing impersonations of Prince Charles and Alastair Burnet.

He switched to script-writing in 1995, completing a script-writing course led by Laurence Marks and Maurice Gran (who created Birds of a Feather) and subsequently starting his writing career with several episodes of Birds of a Feather. Since 2004, he has written around 200 episodes of Coronation Street, including landmark episodes such as Deirdre Barlow's funeral and the aftermath of the 50th anniversary's live tram crash. He has also written several episodes of ITV's Britannia High, and wrote the Coronation Street stage musical Street of Dreams which opened in May 2012.

Rochefort starred in and was executive producer of Corrie Goes To Kenya on ITV 1 in August 2012, a documentary series in which Rochefort took four members of the Coronation Street cast to Mombasa to work with SAFE, a Kenyan-based charity which Rochefort is attached to, spreading HIV awareness through drama.

Rochefort is also a script consultant on BBC 4's award-winning comedy Getting On starring Jo Brand, Vicky Pepperdine and Jo Scanlan, as well as the more recent Puppy Love also starring Scanlan and Pepperdine.

In the 1990s, Rochefort also wrote and presented his own chat show for BBC Wales, the BAFTA Cymru-nominated Damon Rochefort Tonight. He lives in London and Somerset.

== Personal life ==
In October 2016, Rochefort married Daniel Alexis at a ceremony on the Balearic Island of Ibiza. Coronation Street scriptwriter Jonathan Harvey was Rochefort's best man.
