= Sharon D. Clarke =

British actress and singer

Sharon D. Clarke MBE
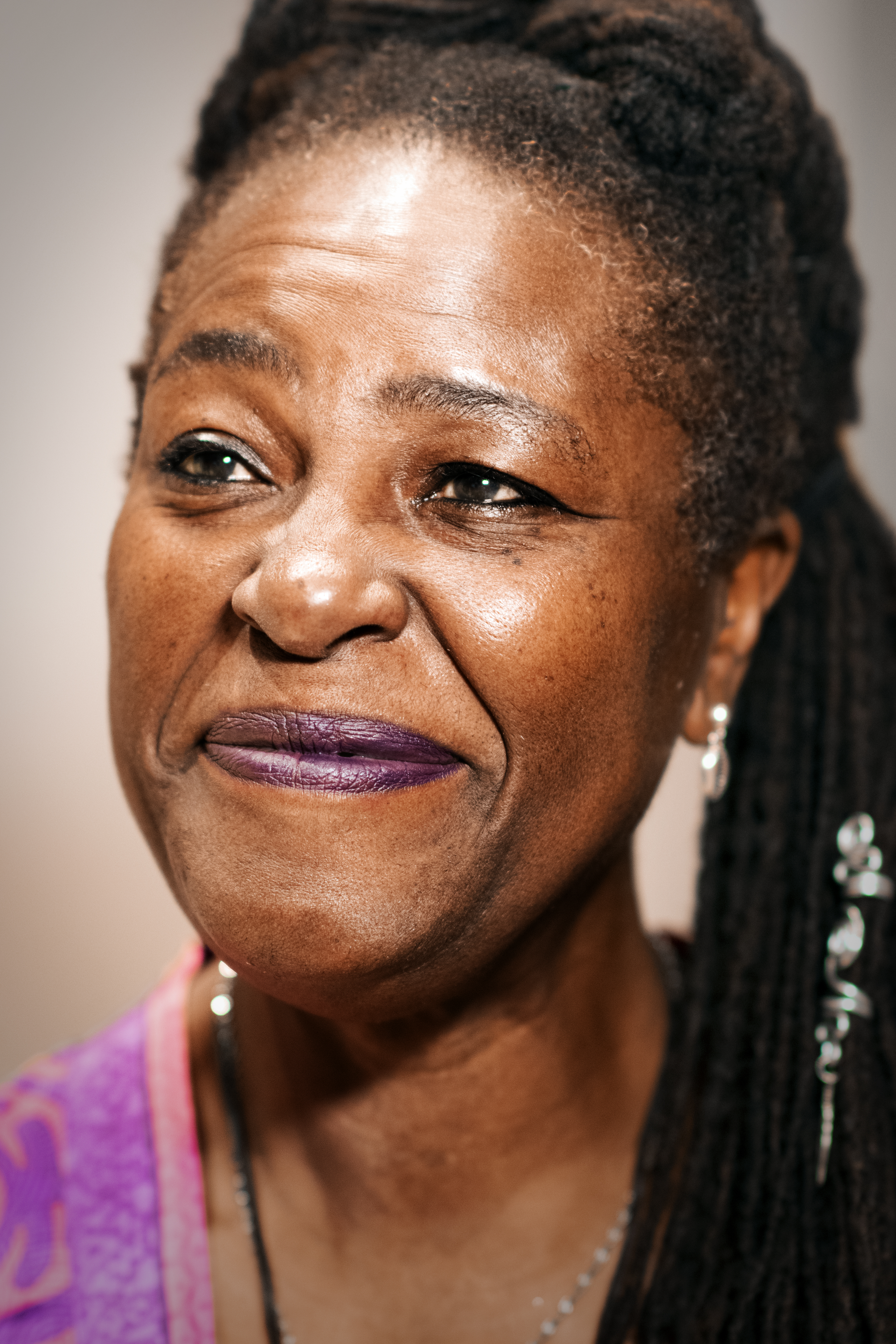
- Clarke in 2022
- Born: Sharon Delores Clarke; Enfield, London, England
- Occupations: Actress, singer
- Years active: 1984–present
- Known for: Holby City; Doctor Who; Caroline, or Change; Death of a Salesman; Ellis
- Spouse: Susie McKenna
- Awards: Laurence Olivier Award for Best Actress in a Supporting Role (2014); Laurence Olivier Award for Best Actress in a Musical (2019); Laurence Olivier Award for Best Actress (2020)
- Honours: Member of the Order of the British Empire (2017)

Sharon Delores Clarke is an English actress and singer. She is a three-time Olivier Award winner, and is best known for her television roles as Lola Griffin in the medical drama Holby City, and as Grace O'Brien in Doctor Who. Clarke has also appeared in numerous West End productions, originating the roles of Killer Queen in We Will Rock You and Oda Mae Brown in Ghost the Musical.

Clarke won the 2014 Laurence Olivier Award for Best Actress in a Supporting Role for her role in James Baldwin's The Amen Corner. She won her second Olivier for Best Actress in a Musical, for her role as Caroline Thibodeaux in the 2018 West End production of Caroline, or Change. She reprised the role on Broadway in 2021, receiving a Tony Award nomination, while the Broadway cast recording received a Grammy Award nomination. In 2020, she won her third Olivier for her performance in Death of a Salesman at London's Young Vic.

In addition to her acting career, Clarke provided lead vocals for the house music acts FPI Project and Nomad.

== Career ==
=== Early career (1984–2004) ===
Clarke's first professional role was in Southside, at Battersea Arts Centre in 1984, directed by Jude Kelly, who also issued her Actor's Equity Card. Her early television appearances included a role as a night nurse in The Singing Detective. Clarke also played Susie in the BBC television film Past Caring, broadcast in 1986. She went on to play Dolores Hope in the 1988 Talawa Theatre Company production of O Babylon! The Musical. The musical follows the Trench Town community's struggle for survival against the encroachment of Babylon, in the form of a new luxury hotel. She then appeared as Mrs Richardson in Children's Ward (1990) and a cook in Between the Lines (1993). She subsequently appeared as a receptionist in Soldier Soldier (1995) and played Flora in the television film Broken Glass (1996).

In 1996, Clarke played General Cartwright in a production of Guys and Dolls at the Royal National Theatre. She later played Joanne Jefferson in Rent at the Shaftesbury Theatre in 1998, followed by Miss Sherman in Fame in 1999. She also played Rafiki in The Lion King in the early 2000s at the Lyceum Theatre and in 2004 played the character of Matron Mama Morton in Chicago. Clarke also played Glinda in Flymonkey's production of The Wiz at the Hackney Empire.

Clarke originated the role of Killer Queen in We Will Rock You, the Queen jukebox musical written by Ben Elton, at the Dominion Theatre in 2002. In November that year, she performed "Another One Bites the Dust" with the cast of We Will Rock You during the BBC's Children in Need fundraiser. For her performance in We Will Rock You, Clarke was nominated for the Laurence Olivier Award for Best Performance in a Supporting Role in a Musical in 2003. Also in 2003, Clarke played Camelia Baptiste in Waking the Dead and provided narration and vocals for the CBeebies animated series Boo!. In 2004, she played the character of Gran'Ma Flossie in the CBBC show The Crust.

=== Career development (2005–2013) ===
Clarke played Lola Griffin in the BBC medical drama Holby City from 2005 until her departure in 2008. After her departure in 2008, Clarke made her pantomime début playing Charity in Mother Goose at the Hackney Empire. Clarke also performed a rendition of Aretha Franklin's "Respect" alongside her Holby City co-stars Nadine Lewington, Rakie Ayola and Phoebe Thomas during BBC Children in Need in November 2007. Apart from acting roles, Clarke has also appeared in various other capacities on television. She sat alongside Russell Watson as a judge on the BBC talent show Last Choir Standing in 2008. In the same year, she appeared as a guest on Ready Steady Cook, hosted by Ainsley Harriott, representing Holby City, and also appeared as a guest on The Paul O'Grady Show.

In 2009, she reprised her role as Asaka in Once on This Island, having previously appeared in the original 1994 production. The revival played at Birmingham Repertory Theatre, Nottingham Playhouse and the Hackney Empire. Earlier that year, she was also announced as part of the cast of The Vagina Monologues at the Hackney Empire. Clarke joined the West End production of the musical Hairspray in October 2009, playing Motormouth Maybelle alongside Phill Jupitus as Edna Turnblad. The production closed on 28 March 2010, with Brian Conley having returned to the role of Edna for its final weeks at the Shaftesbury Theatre. Clarke also voiced Carmina the Camel in the Hackney Empire's 2009 pantomime production of Aladdin.

In July 2010, she appeared in a one-off performance at the Hackney Empire called Sounds Like Hackney, alongside Clive Rowe. On 10 August 2010, Clarke made a guest appearance in The Bill in the episode "Death Knock". Clarke also performed at the Apollo Victoria Theatre's 80th anniversary gala on 10 October 2010, alongside performers from the musical Wicked and other West End Productions.

On 24 January 2011, Clarke appeared in EastEnders, as Connor Stanley's mother Kendra. She went on to play Oda Mae Brown in a musical adaptation of the film Ghost in 2011. The production premiered in March at the Manchester Opera House before transferring to London's Piccadilly Theatre in June. In May 2011, Clarke starred in the BBC drama The Shadow Line as Mrs. Dixon, appearing in episodes 2 and 3. In October 2011, she appeared in a concert of the new musical Soho Cinders at the Queen's Theatre in London.

=== Critical recognition (2012–2018) ===
Clarke was nominated in 2012 for the Laurence Olivier Award for Best Performance in a Supporting Role in a Musical in 2012 for her performance in Ghost the Musical. Also in 2012, Clarke was announced as a performer in the cabaret season at the St James Theatre in London. Clarke also provided the voice of Treetog in the CBeebies animated series Tree Fu Tom, which began airing in 2012.

Clarke appeared in James Baldwin's The Amen Corner at the Royal National Theatre in 2013, for which she won the Laurence Olivier Award for Best Actress in a Supporting Role in 2014. In summer 2014, she played the supporting role of Mariah in the Regent's Park Open Air Theatre production of Porgy and Bess. In March 2015, Clarke played the Nurse in Romeo and Juliet at the Rose Theatre, Kingston. Later that year, she was the voice of Davina the Diva Harp in Jack and the Beanstalk at the Hackney Empire.

In February 2016, Clarke played the title role in a revival of August Wilson's Ma Rainey's Black Bottom at the Lyttelton Theatre. Reviewing the production for The Observer, Susannah Clapp praised Clarke's singing, while Andrzej Lukowski of Time Out commended her portrayal of the blues singer. Dominic Cavendish of The Daily Telegraph also praised Clarke's commanding portrayal of Ma Rainey, while Mark Shenton of The Stage highlighted the power of her performance.

In 2017, she also played the role of Sonja in Cy Coleman's musical The Life at Southwark Playhouse and Caroline Thibodeaux in Caroline, or Change at the Chichester Festival Theatre. In October 2017, the BBC announced that Clarke had been cast as Grace O'Brien in the eleventh series of Doctor Who, appearing in the episodes "The Woman Who Fell To Earth", "Arachnids in the UK" and "It Takes You Away". In December 2017, Clarke made a guest appearance voicing Fire Chief Cass McCready in "Inferno", a second-series episode of Thunderbirds Are Go. The episode was not broadcast on ITV in the UK but was made available through Amazon Video.

Clarke reprised her role in Caroline, or Change when the production transferred to the Playhouse Theatre in the West End in 2018. Clarke played DCI Rose Asante in the 2018 BBC crime drama Informer.

=== Subsequent work (2019–present) ===
Clarke briefly returned to Holby City in January 2019, reprising her role as Lola Griffin for one episode in 2019. She also voiced the character One Hundred in the CBeebies animated series Numberblocks that year. At the 2019 Laurence Olivier Awards, Clarke won the Laurence Olivier Award for Best Actress in a Musical for her performance in Caroline, or Change.

In 2019, Clarke played the role of Linda Loman in Arthur Miller's play Death of a Salesman at the Young Vic, alongside Wendell Pierce as Willy Loman. The production transferred to the Piccadilly Theatre in the West End in October that year. Clarke reprised the role when the production moved to Broadway's Hudson Theatre in September 2022. In July 2019, Clarke played the role of The Lady in Sheldon Epps’s Blues In The Night at the Kiln Theatre, London.

Clarke reprised her role as Grace O'Brien in two further episodes of Doctor Who: the twelfth series episode "Can You Hear Me?" in 2020, and the 2021 festive special "Revolution of the Daleks". A Broadway revival of Caroline, or Change opened at Roundabout Theatre Company's Studio 54 in October 2021, following a postponement caused by the COVID-19 pandemic. Clarke reprised her role, making her Broadway debut, and received positive reviews for her performance. The limited run ended on 9 January 2022.

In 2024, Clarke began starring as DCI Ellis in the Channel 5 and Acorn TV crime drama Ellis alongside Andrew Gower. She also voiced Dulcibear in the musical fantasy film Wicked (2024) and its sequel, Wicked: For Good (2025). Also in 2025, Clarke voiced Dame Gwendolyn Lestrade in the audio drama podcast Sherlock & Co. Clarke was subsequently cast in the title role of William Shakespeare's Othello at the Swan Theatre in Stratford-Upon-Avon, originally scheduled for 2027. The production was postponed in August 2026.

== Personal life ==
Clarke is married to writer and director Susie McKenna. The couple married on the Hackney Empire stage around 2008. In a 2018 interview with the Evening Standard, Clarke discussed her bisexuality and said that her relationships were based on the person rather than their sex. In August 2026, Clarke announced that she was undergoing treatment for cancer, which caused the Royal Shakespeare Company to postpone its production of Othello, in which she was due to play the title role.

== Acting credits ==
=== Film ===
Year	Title	Role	Ref.
1999	Beautiful People	Nurse Tina	
2000	Secret Society	Typhoon	
2007	Sugarhouse	Crystal	
2016	The Works (Short film)	Macbeth	
2016	The Darkest Universe	Megan	
2018	Tau	Queenpin	
2019	Rocketman	Counsellor	
2019	Rocks	Anita	
2022	The Bower (Short film)	Terri (2021)	
2023	Red, White & Royal Blue	British Prime Minister	
2024	Wicked	Dulcibear (voice)	
2025	Wicked: For Good	Dulcibear (voice)	

=== Television ===
Year	Title	Role	Notes	Ref.
1986	Past Caring	Susie	Television film	
1986	The Singing Detective	Night Nurse	3 episodes	
1988	Tumbledown	1st Night Nurse	Television film	
1993	Between the Lines	Cook	Episode: "Some Must Watch"	
1995	Soldier Soldier	Receptionist	Episode: "For Better, for Worse"	
1996	Broken Glass	Flora	Television film	
2003, 2005–08, 2019	Holby City	June Singleton, Lola Griffin	112 episodes	
2003	Waking the Dead	Camelia Baptiste	2 episodes	
2003, 2006	Boo!	Narrator, singer (voices)	11 episodes	
2005	The Crust	Grandma Flossie	4 episodes	
2005	Casualty@Holby City / Casualty	Lola Griffin	3 episodes / Episode: "Deny Thy Father: Part 1"	
2008	HolbyBlue	Lola Griffin	Episode: "Episode #2.1"	
2010	The Bill	Denise Jones	Episode: "Death Knock"	
2011	The Shadow Line	Mrs. Dixon	2 episodes	
2011	EastEnders	Kendra Stanley	1 episode	
2012	Tree Fu Tom	Treetog (voice)	8 episodes	
2013	Psychobitches	Nina Simone, Bessie Smith	2 episodes	
2013	New Tricks	Sarah Kaye	2 episodes	
2015	Death in Paradise	Zeta Akande	Episode: "Stab in the Dark"	
2015	You, Me & Them	Nola	Episode: "The Gift"	
2017	Unforgotten	Agency Manager	Episode: "Episode #2.5"	
2017, 2019	Thunderbirds Are Go	Cass McCready (voice)	2 episodes	
2018	Kiri	Bimpe	Episode: "Episode #1.2"	
2018	Informer	DCI Rose Asante	6 episodes	
2018	Doctors	Nyaqa Dale Setshwane	Episode: "Dreams Are Made On"	
2018	Silent Witness	Senior Special Agent Kim Price	2 episodes	
2018	Flowers	Dr. Malone	Episode: "Episode #2.5"	
2018–2021	Doctor Who	Grace O'Brien, Solitract	5 episodes	
2019–2021	Numberblocks	Various characters	6 episodes	
2019–2020	Waffle the Wonder Dog	Gram	2 episodes	
2020	Tiny Wonders	Narrator	10 episodes	
2021	La Fortuna	Maggie	3 episodes	
2021	Showtrial	Virginia Hoult	5 episodes	
2023–2025	Castlevania: Nocturne	Cécile Fatiman (voice role)	4 episodes	
2024	Lost Boys and Fairies	Claire (foster carer)	2 episodes	
2024	Mr Loverman	Carmel Walker	8 episodes	
2024–2026	Ellis	DCI Ellis	2 series	

=== Theatre ===
Year	Production	Role	Venue	Ref.
1984	Southside	Ensemble cast member	Battersea Arts Centre	
1988	O Babylon! The Musical	Dolores Hope	Riverside Studios	
1994	Once on This Island	Asaka	Birmingham Repertory Theatre; Peacock Theatre	
1996	Guys and Dolls	General Cartwright	Royal National Theatre	
1998	Rent	Joanne Jefferson	Shaftesbury Theatre	
1999	Fame	Miss Sherman	Oslo Spektrum; Swedish tour	
2002	We Will Rock You	Killer Queen	Dominion Theatre	
2004	Chicago	Matron Mama Morton	Adelphi Theatre	
2008	Mother Goose	Charity	Hackney Empire	
2009	Once on This Island	Asaka	Birmingham Repertory Theatre; Nottingham Playhouse; Hackney Empire	
2011	Ghost the Musical	Oda Mae Brown	Manchester Opera House; Piccadilly Theatre	
2013	The Amen Corner	Odessa	Royal National Theatre (Olivier Theatre)	
2014	Porgy and Bess	Mariah	Regent's Park Open Air Theatre	
2015	Romeo and Juliet	Nurse	Rose Theatre Kingston	
2015	Jack and the Beanstalk	Davina the Diva Harp (voice)	Hackney Empire	
2016	Ma Rainey's Black Bottom	Ma Rainey	Royal National Theatre (Lyttelton Theatre)	
2017	The Life	Sonja	Southwark Playhouse	
2017	Caroline, or Change	Caroline Thibodeaux	Minerva Theatre	
2018	Caroline, or Change	Caroline Thibodeaux	Hampstead Theatre; Playhouse Theatre	
2019	Death of a Salesman	Linda Loman	Young Vic; Piccadilly Theatre	
2019	Blues in the Night	The Lady	Kiln Theatre	
2021	Caroline, or Change	Caroline Thibodeaux	Studio 54	
2022	Death of a Salesman	Linda Loman	Hudson Theatre	
2024	The Importance of Being Earnest	Lady Bracknell	National Theatre, Lyttelton Theatre	

== Discography ==
=== Singles and collaborations ===
Year	Title	Artist	UK Singles Chart peak	Ref.
1989	Going Back to My Roots	FPI Project featuring Sharon D. Clarke	9	
1990	(I Wanna Give You) Devotion	Nomad	2	
1991	Just a Groove	Nomad	16	
1991	Something Special	Nomad	73	
2000	Only the Women Know	Six Chix	72	

=== Cast recordings and albums ===
Year	Album	Credit	Ref.
1997	Once on This Island	Original London cast	
1998	Stepping Out: The Musical	Original London cast	
2002	We Will Rock You	Original London cast	
2009	Only You Can Save Mankind	Studio recording participant	
2011	Ghost the Musical	Original London cast	

== Awards, nominations and honours ==
Year	Award	Work	Result	Ref.
1995	Laurence Olivier Award for Best Performance in a Supporting Role in a Musical	Once on This Island	Nominated	
2003	Laurence Olivier Award for Best Performance in a Supporting Role in a Musical	We Will Rock You	Nominated	
2012	Laurence Olivier Award for Best Performance in a Supporting Role in a Musical	Ghost	Nominated	
2014	Laurence Olivier Award for Best Actress in a Supporting Role	The Amen Corner	Won	
2017	Member of the Order of the British Empire (MBE)	Services to drama	Appointed	
	Offie for Supporting Female in a Musical	The Life	Won	
2018	Evening Standard Theatre Award for Best Musical Performance	Caroline, or Change	Nominated	
2019	Laurence Olivier Award for Best Actress in a Musical	Caroline, or Change	Won	
2019	Black British Theatre Awards for Best Female Actor in a Musical	Caroline, or Change	Won	
2019	Critics' Circle Theatre Award for Best Actress	Death of a Salesman	Won	
2020	Laurence Olivier Award for Best Actress	Death of a Salesman	Won	
2022	Tony Award for Best Actress in a Musical	Caroline, or Change	Nominated	
2022	Drama Desk Award for Outstanding Actress in a Musical	Caroline, or Change	Nominated	
2022	Outer Critics Circle Award for Outstanding Actress in a Musical	Caroline, or Change	Nominated	
2022	Drama League Award for Distinguished Performance	Caroline, or Change	Nominated	
2022	Theatre World Award for Outstanding Debut Performance	Caroline, or Change	Won	
2023	Grammy Award for Best Musical Theater Album	Caroline, or Change	Nominated	
2023	Drama Desk Award for Outstanding Lead Performance in a Play	Death of a Salesman	Nominated	
2023	Outer Critics Circle Award for Outstanding Featured Performer in a Broadway Play	Death of a Salesman	Nominated	
2023	Drama League Award for Distinguished Performance	Death of a Salesman	Nominated	
2025	Laurence Olivier Award for Best Actress in a Supporting Role	The Importance of Being Earnest	Nominated	
