= Allison Harding =

Northern Irish actor, musician, director

- Born: Allison Harding; 9 April 1964 (age 62); Portsmouth, England
- Occupation: Actress
- Years active: 1985–present

Allison Harding (born 9 April 1964) is a musical and drama theatre actor, professional singer, musician, and writer/director from Hastings, Northern Ireland. Allison has performed in productions in theatres in the UK.

== Early life ==
Allison Harding was born in Portsmouth, United Kingdom. She graduated from Arts Educational Schools, London, Drama (3 years; 1982–1985).

== Career ==
Harding made her theatre debut in 1985 at Birmingham Repertory Theatre in The Snow Queen as Gerda. As a member of Birningham Repertory's Young Company she played in the piece about Russian revolutionaries, Dead Men by Mike Stott, as Anna, (1985) Ken Whitmore's adaptation of the Government Inspector (N.V.Gogol) – La Bolshie Vita (1986), and The Wild Duck by Ibsen as Hedvig (1986). Harding later worked in theatrical musicals.

In the period 2002–2008 she Harding returned to the drama theatre. In Queen's Theatre, Hornchurch, she played Lady Macbeth in Macbeth (2006), Martha in Who's Afraid of Virginia Woolf? (2005), and Landlady in Two (2006). While at Queen's Theatre she was a member of the Cut to the Chase company.

== Filmography ==
=== Films ===
Year	Film	Character
2018	Mamma Mia! 2 "Here We Go Again"	Ensemble
2017	Beauty and the Beast (Walt Disney; 2017)	Head Washerwoman

=== Television ===
Year(s)	Series	Character	Notes
2000	The Bill	Mrs. Wakefield	Episode: "All fall down"
2000	London's Burning	Jean	
2010	Moses Jones	Fish Monger	

== Theatre ==
=== Stage productions ===
- The Snow Queen, as Gerda, Birmingham Repertory Theatre (Young Company) (1985)
- Dead Men by Mike Stott as Anna, Birmingham Repertory Theatre (Young Company) (1985)
- The Wild Duck, as Hedvig, Birmingham Repertory Theatre (Young Company) by Ibsen as Hedvig (1986)
- La Bolshie Vita by Ken Whitmore (1986)
- Piaf, as Toine, Torch Theatre (Wales) (1986)
- Jack and the Beanstalk Pantomime, as Jill, Gateway Theatre (Chester)
- The Cherry Orchard, as Dunyasha Bristol Old Vic (1988)
- Cabaret, as Sally Bowles, Century Theatre Keswick (1988)
- Return to the Forbidden Planet, as Miranda (Original West End Cast), Pola Jones Ltd (1989)
- From a Jack to a King, as Queenie, Ambassadors Theatre (London), (1992)
- In the Midnight Hour, as Duffy, Queen's Theatre, Hornchurch, (1994)
- A Chorus of Disapproval as Bridgit Baines, Queen's Theatre, Hornchurch (1995)
- Out With a Bang, as Dr Reade, Crucible Theatre Sheffield, South Yorkshire, (1996)
- Return to the Forbidden Planet, as Science Officer, Queen's Theatre, Hornchurch National Tour (1996)
- Oliver, as Nancy, Lyric Theatre, (1997)
- From a Jack to a King, as Queenie, Theatre Royal, Bath, (1997)
- The Adventures of Robyn Hood, as Sheriff of Nottingham, Drill Hall, London, (1998)
- Her Aching Heart, as Harriett, Drill Hall, London (1999)
- The Beggars Opera, as Lucy Lockit, Queen's Theatre, Hornchurch, (1995)
- Romeo and Juliet, as Lord Montague, Pola Jones Ltd (2000) Leicester Haymarket Theatre
- Crazy Lady as Claudia, RADA Studios (formerly The Drill Hall), (2000)
- Todd! the Demon Barber of Fleet Street as Mrs Lovett, Kabosh Theatre, (2002)
- April in Paris as Bet, Queen's Theatre, Hornchurch, (2002)
- Middle-age Spread as Elizabeth, Queen's Theatre, Hornchurch, (2003)
- In the Parlour with the Ladies: A Victorian Parlour Evening in 1893 as Arabella, RADA Studios (formerly The Drill Hall), (2003)
- In the Bunker with the Ladies – A Wartime Bunker Evening in 1943 as Babe, RADA Studios (formerly The Drill Hall), (2003)
- Nunsense as Sister Mary Hubert, Eastbourne Theatres, (2004)
- Sleeping Beauty – The Rock 'n' Roll Panto as Fairy Morgana Clwyd Theatr Cymru, (2004)
- Who's Afraid of Virginia Woolf as Martha, Queen's Theatre, Hornchurch, (2005)
- Cinderella as Fairy Godmother, Queen's Theatre, Hornchurch, (2005)
- Curses! as mrs Knight, Queen's Theatre, Hornchurch, (2005)
- The Marriage Bed – an Uncivil Partnership as Val, RADA Studios (formerly The Drill Hall), (2006)
- Room at the Top as Eslpeth, Queen's Theatre, Hornchurch, (2006)
- Macbeth as Lady Macbeth, Queen's Theatre, Hornchurch, (2006)

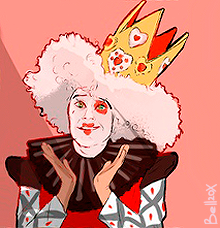
Allison Harding as Quinn of Hearts, Alice the Musical by Paul Boyd, Lyric Belfast, 2019

- Two as Landlady, Queen's Theatre, Hornchurch, (2006)
- It's a Fine Life as Mrs Begleiter, Queen's Theatre, Hornchurch, (2006)
- Smilin' Through as Nelson Eddy Birmingham Repertory Theatre, (2007)
- Blonde Bombshells of 1943 as Betty, TEG Productions, (2008)
- Honk! the Ugly Duckling as Grace, Dot, and Lowbutt, The Watermill Theatre, (2007)
- Sister Act (original cast) Ensemble/Cover and played Sister Mary Lazurus, Whoopi Goldberg/Stage Entertainment Ltd. London Palladium, (2010)
- Pick Yourself Up as Tallulah, Queen's Theatre, Hornchurch, (2011)
- Once as Baruska, Phoenix Theatre, London, (2014)
- The Girls Cover: Chris/Cora/Marie/Miss Wilson, David Pugh Productions (2014)
- Sister Act (original cast) Sister Mary Teresa/First cover Mother Superior, Jamie Wilson Productions UK TOUR, (2017)
- Dick Whittington & his cat as Fairy Bow Bells, Devonshire Park Theatre, Eastbourne, (2017)
- "Alice" the Musical as Queen of Hearts, Lyric Theatre, (2018)
- Peter Pan as Captain Jess Hook, Lyric Theatre, (2019)
- Kiss Me Kate as Ralph, Northern Ireland Opera, (2020)
