= Dodie discography =

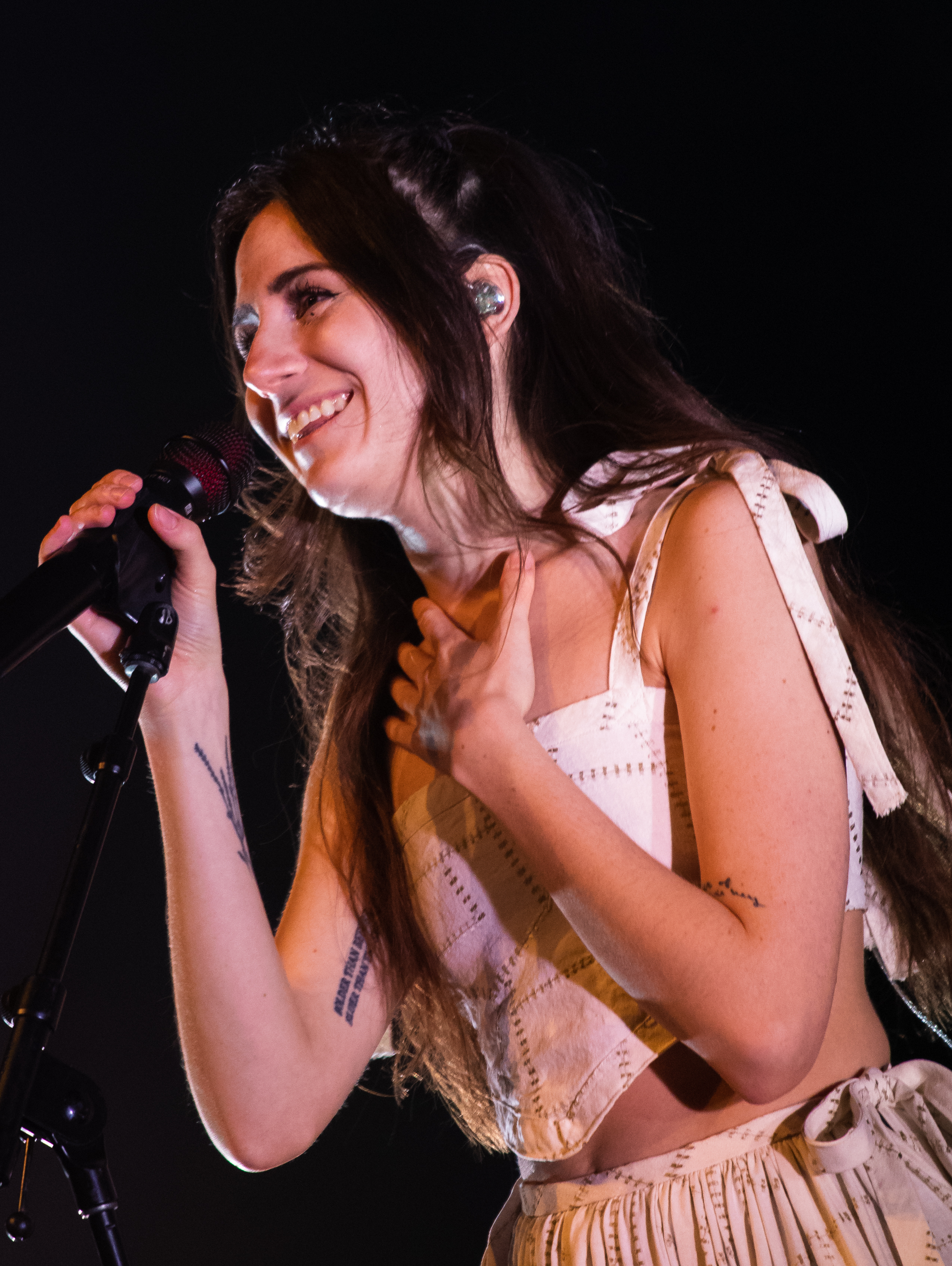
- Studio albums: 2
- EPs: 7
- Singles: 15
- Music videos: 40

The discography of British singer-songwriter and YouTuber Dodie consists of two studio albums, seven extended plays, 15 singles, and 40 music videos. She has also uploaded multiple original songs and covers to her YouTube channels doddleoddle and doddlevloggle.

== Studio albums ==
Title	Album details	Peak chart positions			
Title	Album details	UK	US	US Folk	US Indie
Build a Problem	Released: 7 May 2021; Label: Doddleoddle, The Orchard; Formats: CD, vinyl, cassette, digital download, streaming	3	115	4	13
Not for Lack of Trying	Released: 3 October 2025; Label: Doddleoddle, Decca, Universal Music Group; Formats: CD, vinyl, cassette, digital download, streaming	42	—	—	—

== Extended plays ==
List of EPs, with selected chart positions
Title	Album details	Peak chart positions								
Title	Album details	UK	AUS	CAN	IRE	US	US Alt	US Folk	US Indie	US Rock
Intertwined	Released: 10 November 2016; Label: Doddleoddle; Formats: CD, digital download, streaming	35	—	—	33	153	13	5	10	25
You	Released: 11 August 2017; Label: Doddleoddle; Formats: CD, digital download, 10" vinyl, streaming	6	17	34	5	55	—	3	2	—
Human	Released: 18 January 2019; Label: Doddleoddle, The Orchard; Formats: CD, digital download, LP, streaming	5	50	60	13	82	—	2	4	–
Deezer Sessions (Women's Voices)	Released: 23 March 2021; Label: Doddleoddle; Formats: streaming	―	―	―	―	―	―	―	—	—
Hot Mess	Released: 30 September 2022; Label: Doddleoddle; Formats: Digital download, streaming, vinyl	― (Note: Hot Mess did not enter the UK Singles Chart but peaked at number 64 on the Singles Sales Chart.)	―	―	―	―	―	―	—	—
Live at Metropolis	Released: December 2022; Label: Doddleoddle; Formats: vinyl	―	―	―	―	―	―	―	—	—
Dodie (Live at NPR's Tiny Desk)	Released: 5 May 2023; Label: Doddleoddle, The Orchard; Formats: Digital download, streaming	―	―	―	―	―	―	―	—	—
"—" denotes releases that did not chart or were not released in that region.

== Singles ==
=== As lead artist ===
Title	Year	Peak chart positions	Album
Title	Year	SCO	Album
"Sick of Losing Soulmates"	2016	—	Intertwined
"Intertwined"	2017	—	Intertwined
"6/10"	2017	—	You
"You"	2017	—	You
"Party Tattoos"	2018	—	Non-album single
"Human" (featuring Tom Walker)	2018	—	Human
"If I'm Being Honest"	2018	—	Human
"Monster"	2019	—	Human
"Guiltless"	2019	—	Build a Problem
"Boys Like You"	2019	99	Build a Problem
"Cool Girl"	2020	—	Build a Problem
"Rainbow"	2020	—	Build a Problem
"Hate Myself"	2021	—	Build a Problem
"I Kissed Someone (It Wasn't You)"	2021	—	Build a Problem
"Love to Keep Me Warm" (featuring Laufey)	2021	—	Non-album single
"Got Weird"	2022	—	Hot Mess
"Hot Mess"	2022	—	Hot Mess
"Lonely Bones"	2022	—	Hot Mess
"I'm Fine!"	2025	—	Not for Lack of Trying
"I Feel Bad for You, Dave"	2025	—	Not for Lack of Trying
"Darling, Angel, Baby" (featuring Greta Isaac)	2025	—	Not for Lack of Trying
"Mean to Me"	2026	—	TBA
"Call When You Can"	2026	—	TBA
"Fruit in the Sun"	2026	—	TBA

=== As featured artist ===
Title	Year	Album
"All I Do Is Dream of You" (Faultline featuring Dodie)	2018	Non-album single
"Breakup Mashup" (Pomplamoose featuring Dodie)	2019	Pomplamoose: Best of 2019
"Shotgun" (Pomplamoose featuring Dodie)	2019	Non-album single
"Here Comes the Sun" (Jacob Collier featuring Dodie)	2019	Djesse Vol. 2
"Monster" (Pomplamoose featuring Dodie)	2020	Non-album single
"I Eat Boys (Remix)" Chloe Moriondo featuring Dodie)	2021	Blood Bunny
"Nobody" (Half Alive featuring Dodie)	2023	Non-album single
"Call Me Wild" (Cory Wong featuring Dodie)	2023	The Lucky One
"Mean to Me" (Jeff Goldblum & The Mildred Snitzer Orchestra featuring Dodie)	2026	Night Blooms

== Guest appearances ==
Title	Year	Other artist(s)	Album
"More or Less"	2016	Frank Hamilton	Songs to Make Life Slightly Less Awkward
"Ready Now"	2019	—N/a	MOOMINVALLEY (Official Soundtrack)

== YouTube songs ==
All original songs and covers uploaded on Dodie's YouTube channels.

=== Original songs ===
Title	Year	Album
"Rain"	2011	—N/a
"A Song About a Song"	2011	—N/a
"The Ill Ukulele Song"	2012	—N/a
"You're Just A Dream"	2012	—N/a
"The YouTube Song"	2012	—N/a
"Fickle"	2012	—N/a
"Stuck The Way We Are"	2012	—N/a
"From Braces to Lipstick"	2012	—N/a
"A Permanent Hug From You"	2012	—N/a
"Absolutely Smitten"	2013	Intertwined
"Paint"	2013	—N/a
"Little Mosquito"	2013	—N/a
"There's A Storm Coming Tonight"	2013	—N/a
"Christmas Time"	2013	—N/a
"Social Dance"	2014	—N/a
"Adored By Him"	2014	—N/a
"She"	2014	Human
"Little Room"	2015	—N/a
"Pas De Deux"	2015	—N/a
"Faces Going Places" (featuring Lucy Moon)	2015	—N/a
"All We Do" (featuring Lucy Moon)	2015	—N/a
"An Awkward Duet" (featuring Jon Cozart)	2015	—N/a
"One For the Road"	2015	—N/a
"The Flat's a Mess" (featuring Evan Edinger)	2015	—N/a
"Down"	2015	—N/a
"The Slowest Man Alive"	2015	—N/a
"Sick of Losing Soulmates"	2015	Intertwined
"Freckles and Constellations"	2015	—N/a
"Gold Star For Me" (featuring Carrie Hope Fletcher)	2016	—N/a
"Gold Star For Me" (featuring. Bethan Leadley; for CokeTV)	2016	—N/a
"My Face"	2016	—N/a
"Intertwined"	2016	Intertwined
"I've Been Busy"	2016	—N/a
"This Is For Me"	2016	—N/a
"I Won't Be Done"	2016	—N/a
"Tell Me A Story" (featuring Evan Edinger)	2016	—N/a
"Human" (featuring Jon Cozart)	2016	Human
"Would You Be So Kind?"	2016	You
"When"	2016	Intertwined & Build a Problem
"Dear Happy" (featuring Thomas Sanders)	2016	—N/a
"Secret For the Mad"	2016	You
"I Knew You Once"	2017	—N/a
"You"	2017	You
"Instrumental"	2017	You
"No Words"	2017	—N/a
"I'm Bisexual (a coming out song)"	2017	—N/a
"Party Tattoos"	2017	—N/a
"6/10"	2017	You
"In the Middle (acoustic)"	2017	You
"Burned Out"	2017	Human
"Not What I Meant (Bitter Content)" (featuring Dom Fera)	2018	Human
"Far Away"	2018	—N/a
"Rainbow"	2018	Build a Problem
"Why The Rainbow Is Ours!"	2018	—N/a
"Air So Sweet" (demo)	2018	Build a Problem
"Human" (acoustic version in my bedroom!)	2018	Human
"Party"	2018	—N/a
"Ready Now"	2019	MOOMINVALLEY (Official Soundtrack)
"Guiltless (Lyric Video)"	2019	Build a Problem
"Think Too Hard"	2019	—N/a
"Red and Green"	2019	—N/a
"Just Fine" (lo fi break up song)	2020	—N/a
"Bored Like Me (Please Listen Closely)" (Demo)	2020	Build a Problem
"Let Go" (Demo)	2020	Build a Problem
"Bite Back" (Demo)	2020	Build a Problem
"Cool Girl" (Demo)	2020	Build a Problem
"Me writing a song to wash ur hands to"	2020	—N/a
"One Last Time, Please" (Demo)	2020	Build a Problem
"All My Daughters" (Demo)	2020	Build a Problem
"A song I wrote about Twitter"	2020	—N/a
"Anything"	2020	Build a Problem
"In the Bed (Drawing The Blinds)"	2020	Build a Problem
"Don't Quite Belong"	2020	Build a Problem
"I Cried at The Simpsons"	2020	—N/a
"Cool Girl" (Lyric Video)	2020	Build a Problem
"Party 2.0"	2020	—N/a
"A whole damn set cause why not" ("Anything", "In the Bed", "Cool Girl", "Hate Myself")	2021	Build a Problem
"Build a Problem: A Live Performance"	2021	Build a Problem
"BBQ Suck"	2021	—N/a
"Four Tequilas Down"	2021	Build a Problem
"Bored Like Me" (with Adam Melchor)	2021	Build a Problem
"Hot Mess"	2022	Hot Mess
"These Things"	2022	—N/a
"A Friday in the Life of Richard and Betty"	2022	—N/a
"Unhinged"	2022	—N/a
"Parasocial Promise"	2022	—N/a
"Don't Wanna Know"	2022	—N/a
"Tall Kids"	2022	Not For Lack of Trying
"Help Myself"	2022	-

=== Covers ===
Title	Original Artist	Year
"The Break Up Song"	Rhett & Link	2011
"Us"	Regina Spektor	2011
"Fairytale of New York"	The Pogues ft. Kirsty MacColl	2011
"Turning Tables"	Adele	2012
"Sherlocked"	Dodie's Mother	2012
"Nobody's Perfect"	Jessie J	2012
"Somebody that I Used to Know"	Gotye	2012
"Build Me Up Buttercup"	The Foundations	2012
"The Ground"	Orla Gartland	2012
"Your Song"	Elton John	2012
"Devil on My Shoulder"	Orla Gartland	2012
"Daydreamer"	Adele	2012
"I'm a Believer" (featuring Bry)	Neil Diamond	2012
"Somewhere Over the Rainbow"	Judy Garland	2012
"I Want to Hold Your Hand" (featuring Tom Law)	The Beatles	2013
"Kiss You"	One Direction	2013
"Ukulele summer mashup!" (Walking on Sunshine, Twist and Shout, Five Years Time, Year 3000)	Katrina and the Waves, The Beatles, Noah and the Whale, Busted	2013
"Cups"	Anna Kendrick	2013
"Roar"	Katy Perry	2013
"Zip-a-Dee-Doo-Dah" (featuring GaryC)	Song of the South	2014
"Hey There Delilah"	Plain White T's	2014
"La Vie en Rose"	Edith Piaf	2014
"Broken Record" (featuring Tessa Violet)	Tessa Violet	2014
"Toothpaste Kisses"	The Maccabees	2014
"Shake It Off"	Taylor Swift	2014
"Daisy, Daisy"	Harry Dacre	2014
"Dream a Little Dream of Me" (featuring Hazel Hayes)	Ozzie Nelson	2014
"On My Own"	Les Misérables	2014
"The Chain" (featuring Orla Gartland & Lauren Aquilina)	Ingrid Michaelson	2014
"All About That Bass" (featuring Bry)	Meghan Trainor	2014
"Blank Space (song)"	Taylor Swift	2014
"The Christmas Song"	Nat King Cole	2014
"Thinking Out Loud" (featuring Bry)	Ed Sheeran	2015
"Facing West"	The Staves	2015
"Novels" (featuring Rusty Clanton)	Rusty Clanton	2015
"Pop Party Mashup" (Rude, Boom Clap, This Is How We Do, Chandelier, Sing, All About That Bass)	MAGIC!, Charli XCX, Katy Perry, Sia, Ed Sheeran, Meghan Trainor	2015
"Riptide"	Vance Joy	2015
"FourFiveSeconds" (featuring Jack Howard)	Rihanna, Kanye West, & Paul McCartney	2015
"I Wish I Was a Punk Rocker (With Flowers in My Hair)"	Sandi Thom	2015
"All About You" (featuring Bry)	McFly	2015
"The Moon Song" (with Sammy Paul)	Karen O	2015
"A Song About Acne" (featuring Charlie McDonnell)	Charlie McDonnell	2015
"Here Comes the Sun"	The Beatles	2015
"Drag Me Down"	One Direction	2015
"Goner"	Twenty One Pilots	2015
"Can't Help Falling in Love"	Elvis Presley	2015
"Miss Jackson"	Panic! at the Disco	2015
"I Feel Fine"	The Beatles	2015
"Pop Party 15 Mashup!" (Levels, One Last Time, She's Kinda Hot, Wake Up, Glitterball, Cool For the Summer, Best Summer Ever)	Nick Jonas, Ariana Grande, 5 Seconds of Summer, The Vamps, Sigma ft. Ella Henderson, Demi Lovato, Teen Beach 2	2015
"Crazy Toxic mashup" (Toxic/Crazy)	Britney Spears/Gnarles Barkley	2015
"Happy Ending" (featuring NotJustBlonde and Melanie Baker)	MIKA	2015
"What Are You Doing New Year's Eve?" (featuring Emma Blackery)	Ella Fitzgerald	2015
"YEARS YEARS BEARS" (with Tom Rosenthal)	Tom Rosenthal	2016
"Love Yourself (Swing Cover)" (featuring Andie Isalie)	Justin Bieber	2016
"Drive"	Oh Wonder	2016
"Can't Feel My Superbass" (Can't Feel My Face, Magic, Decode, Misery Business, Baby, Super Bass) (featuring Andie Isalie & Orla Gartland)	The Weeknd, Coldplay, Paramore, Justin Bieber, Nicki Minaj	2016
"Bring It All Back" (featuring Sarah Close)	S Club 7	2016
"Death of a Bachelor"	Panic! at the Disco	2016
"My Anthem"	Christina Grimmie	2016
"Into You"	Ariana Grande	2016
"Somebody Else"	The 1975	2016
"Taking Back My Heart" (featuring Tessa Violet)	Rusty Clanton	2016
"a love song/a non love song" (featuring Jon Cozart)	Jon Cozart	2016
"Baby It's Cold Outside" (featuring Lewis Watson)	Neptune's Daughter	2016
"City of Stars" (featuring Jon Cozart)	La La Land	2017
"Someone in the Crowd"	La La Land	2017
"Lollipop"	MIKA	2017
"mashup!" (Stay With Me, Pompeii, She Looks So Perfect, Budapest)	Sam Smith, Bastille, 5 Seconds of Summer, George Ezra	2017
"I Want Candy"	The Strangeloves	2017
"Come Together" (featuring Jon Cozart)	Musica Nuda	2017
"Even If It's a Lie"	Matt Maltese	2017
"New York, New York" (featuring Thomas Sanders)	Billy Joel	2017
"Raindrops Keep Falling on My Head"	BJ Thomas	2017
"Birds" (featuring Thomas Sanders)	Ultimate Storytime Musical	2017
"words ain't enough" (with Tessa Violet)	Tessa Violet	2017
"Havana" (with FLASHBACK)	Camila Cabello ft. Young Thug	2018
"God Is a Woman" (with Julia Nunes & Orla Gartland)	Ariana Grande	2018
"My Favourite Things"	The Sound of Music	2018
"Hakuna Matata"(mini-cover)	The Lion King	2018
"I Have a Dream"(mini-cover)	ABBA	2018
"Too Shy to Take a Shine"(mini-cover)	Darwin Deez	2018
"raindrops (an angel cried)" (mini-cover)	Ariana Grande	2018
"Crush" (mini-cover)	Tessa Violet	2018
"Crazy Human Psycho Crush – Mshup" (Human, I Go Crazy, Crush, Psycho) (with Orla Gartland, Tessa Violet, & Lauren Aquilina)	dodie, Orla Gartland, Tessa Violet, Lauren Aquilina	2018
"Lucy in the Sky with Diamonds"	The Beatles	2019
"Somewhere Only We Know" (with Adam Melchor)	Keane	2019
"Jewel" (with Adam Melchor)	Adam Melchor	2019
"Leave Fast"	Sam Fender	2019
"I Love You More"	Son of Cloud	2019
"Blackbird"	The Beatles	2020
"Man from the Magazine"	Haim	2020
"Make Out in My Car"	Moses Sumney/Sufjan Stevens	2020
"Spooky Scary"	Andrew Gold	2020
"Insecurity Mashup 2" (Cool Girl, Swap Places, Pretending, Games) (with Lauren Aquilina, Orla Gartland, and Tessa Violet)	dodie, Lauren Aquilina, Orla Gartland, Tessa Violet	2021
"That Funny Feeling" but my verse	Bo Burnham	2021
"Bring Him Home"	Les Misérables	2021

== Music videos ==
Title	Director	Year
"Sick of Losing Soulmates"	Sammy Paul	2016
"Intertwined"	Sammy Paul	2017
"6/10"	Sammy Paul	2017
"You"	Bertie Gilbert	2017
"In the Middle"	Tom Brennan	2017
"Secret for the Mad"	Hannah Jacobs	2018
"Human"	Hazel Hayes	2018
"If I'm Being Honest (Live Session)"	Sammy Paul	2018
"If I'm Being Honest"	Dom Fera	2018
"Monster"	PJ Liguori	2019
"Here Comes the Sun" (with Jacob Collier)	Dodie Clark & Jacob Collier	2019
"Guiltless"	Guy Larsen	2019
"Boys Like You"	Cambria Bailey-Jones	2019
"Cool Girl"	Charlie Di Placido & Dodie Clark	2020
"Cool Girl" (Live in an abandoned pool)	Richard Hutchison	2020
"Hate Myself"	Sammy Paul	2021
"Hate Myself" (Live in an abandoned school)	Richard Hutchinson	2021
"I Kissed Someone (It Wasn't You)"	Hazel Hayes	2021
"Four Tequilas Down" (Official Lyric Video)	Jack Howard	2021
"Air So Sweet" (Official Lyric Video)	Jack Howard	2021
"Rainbow" (Official Lyric Video)	Jack Howard	2021
"Special Girl" (Official Lyric Video)	Jack Howard	2021
"Before the Line" (Official Lyric Video)	Jack Howard	2021
"Hate Myself" (Official Lyric Video)	Jack Howard	2021
"Cool Girl" (Official Lyric Video)	Jack Howard	2021
"I Kissed Someone (It Wasn't You)" (Official Lyric Video)	Jack Howard	2021
"When" (Official Lyric Video)	Jack Howard	2021
"Sorry" (Official Lyric Video)	Jack Howard	2021
"?"	Jack Howard	2021
"."	Jack Howard	2021
"Hate Myself" (Live Vevo Studio Performance)	Jim Wilmot	2021
"Build a Problem full visual album"	Jim Wilmot	2021
"Hate Myself" (Late Night with Seth Meyers)	Jack Howard	2021
"Hate Myself" (Late Night with Seth Meyers)	Greta Isaac	2021
"Hot Mess" (live from the Attic)	Tash Tung	2022
"Got Weird" (live from the Attic)	Tash Tung	2022
"Lonely Bones" (live from the Attic)	Tash Tung	2022
"No Big Deal (I Love You)" (live from the Attic)	Tash Tung	2022
"I'M FINE!"	Sammy Paul / Dodie	2025

== As part of Fizz ==
=== Studio albums ===
- The Secret to Life (Released: 27 October 2023; Label: FKA Chairs, Decca Records)

=== Singles ===
- "High in Brighton" (2023)
- "Hell of a Ride" (2023)
- "Close One" (2023)
- "As Good As It Gets" (2023)
- "You, Me, Lonely" (2023)
