= Greta Isaac =

Welsh indie-pop musician (born 1995)

- Born: 10 May 1995 (age 31); Cowbridge, Wales
- Parent(s): Myfyr Isaac; Caryl Parry Jones
- Musical career
- Genres: Alternative pop; indie pop
- Instruments: Vocals; guitar
- Years active: 2012–present
- Labels: Made Records; Decca

Greta Isaac (born 10 May 1995) is a Welsh singer and songwriter known for alternative pop music. Isaac has four EPs: Pessimist (2021), I Think You’d Hate it Here (2022), Productive Pain (2025), and Dolly Zoom (2025). She was also part of the musical collective Fizz along with fellow musicians dodie, Orla Gartland, and Martin Luke Brown. Fizz released one album, The Secret to Life (2023) before the members announced in July 2024 that the group would be disbanding.

== Early life ==
Isaac grew up in Cowbridge, Wales, in a family full of musicians. Her mother is Welsh singer, actor and presenter Caryl Parry Jones, and her father Myfyr Isaac is also a musician and sound engineer. She has four siblings, including two older sisters.

== Musical career ==
=== 2012–2014: Early career ===
Isaac began her career playing in venues and festivals in Wales, including Green Man Festival in 2012 and 2014. She was also part of the lineup of the band The People The Poet between 2012-2014, including for the creation and release of their debut album The Narrator (2013). She and her sister Miriam were later featured as guest vocalists on a demo released by the band in 2020.

In the earlier years of her career, Isaac frequently appeared as a guest vocalist for long-time friend and musical collaborator Orla Gartland, supporting her during the promotion of Gartland's EP Roots in 2014 and at festivals such as Barn on the Farm 2014. The pair also collaborated on several covers, some of which were shared on social media.

Two early EPs released by Isaac are no longer available on Spotify: Down By The Water (2014) and Oh Babe (2015).

=== 2015–2018 ===
In September 2015, Isaac was one of the performers featured at BBC Radio 2 Live in Hyde Park, a live concert festival which showcases major stars on its main stage and up-and-coming artists on its Introducing stage. In 2015, she was also one of 35 artists from across Wales to be selected for the BBC Wales Launchpad fund aimed at boosting the careers of Welsh musicians.

The following year saw the release of single "Don't Tell" where Isaac's "angelic vocals have found their bite," according to Clash magazine.

In 2017, Isaac was one of the opening acts for fellow musician dodie's second EP, You (2017).

Isaac released four singles in total in 2017, including the song "You", which debuted to praise from critics, with The Line of Best Fit calling it "a complex, heart-rending indie-pop song, somehow reminiscent of a female Cage The Elephant garnished with effortless, oozing cool".

She released the single "Undone" in 2018.

=== Pessimist EP (2021) ===
Ahead of her Pessimist EP, Isaac released three of its songs as singles in 2020: "Power", "FU" and "Like Me". Another single, "Emmanuel" (2020), was not featured on the EP. "Power" was premiered by Notion magazine, which later called the EP "an explosive and personal mix of tracks." Isaac said that the song was "about how I feel being looked at as a woman and how I can feel useless without the affirmation of the male gaze," explaining that the lyrics show compliments turning sinister to play with the idea of feminine expectations being used as a weapon against women.

The EP, which was written over an 18-month period, was Isaac's first major project under an indie-pop sound, rather than her earlier music, which leaned on folk influences.

Wonderland magazine praised lead single "How to Be a Woman" for its "emotional-yet-kooky lyrics", calling it a "shining example of the punchy and exaggerated charm that laces the entirety of her EP".

=== I Think You'd Hate It Here EP (2022) ===
Isaac's second EP saw the artist expanding her sound further, pairing intricate lyrics with sonic landscapes that ranged from the stripped back "how are you not freaking out" to the anthemic chorus of "PAYRI$E".

The six-track EP "feels like Greta's arrival as an artist", according to Gigwise, which praised Isaac's evolution. God Is in the TV highlighted the punchy "PAYRI$E" as a standout song, comparing it to a Charli XCX release.

The music video for "NUH UH", the third single released ahead of the EP, following "5'1" and "Polyfilla", premiered on Paper magazine, which described the song as having "grizzly electro-pop production".

=== Fizz and solo: 2023–present ===
Isaac, with fellow artists Orla Gartland, dodie and Martin Luke Brown, formed the musical collective Fizz, which went on to release one album, The Secret to Life, in 2023.

The album was recorded by the quartet over two weeks at a rural studio called Middle Farm Studios with producer Peter Miles. It was released on 27 October 2023, and peaked at number 31 on the UK Albums Chart.

The band announced an official hiatus in July 2024 to focus on their solo careers and projects, stating that there was a possibility the project could be revived at some point.

Isaac's first solo EP to be released post-band, Productive Pain, came out on 19 February 2025. In an interview with Hunger Mag, Isaac shared that the EP stemmed from finding a chord progression on an old voice note from years prior, and that this EP, which takes a more contemplative, personal tone, was the first project she'd written with no co-writers in nearly a decade.The EP was recorded with Miles at the same studio as Fizz's album.

A second EP, Dolly Zoom, which focused on a brasher electronic sound, was released on 8 August 2025. Isaac described the alter ego of Dolly as "a way to crack open different parts of myself to unleash what lies beneath a rationalised front. [...] Confronting, sometimes hilarious in shock value – Dolly is the extremities of myself personified."

Isaac collaborated with flatmate (and former bandmate) dodie on a song about their cat, Mrs. The song, called "Darling, Angel, Baby", was released on 12 September 2025 as a single from dodie's second studio album Not for Lack of Trying.

== Other projects ==
Isaac also served as a creative director for Orla Gartland's 2024 album, Everybody Needs a Hero. She has worked on art direction for other artists including Martin Luke Brown, Violet Skies, dodie and Victoria Canal.

== Discography ==
=== EPs ===
Title	EP details
Pessimist	Released: 14 May 2021; Label: Made Records; Formats: digital download
I Think You'd Hate it Here	Released: 13 May 2022; Label: Made Records; Formats: digital download
Productive Pain	Released: 19 February 2025; Label: N/A; Formats: digital download
Dolly Zoom	Released: 8 August 2025; Label: Greta Isaac, Kartel Music Group; Formats: digital download
