= Build a Problem =

- Standard and digital edition cover

Studio album by dodie
- Released: 7 May 2021
- Recorded: 2019–2020
- Studio: RAK Studios; The Pool; Tileyard Education; Snap Studios; Pixel; Dodie's bedroom; Dodie's lounge; Pomplamoose's home studio
- Genre: Indie pop; alt-pop; folk-pop
- Length: 37:51
- Label: Doddleoddle; The Orchard
- Producer: Dodie; Joe Rubel; Pomplamoose

Dodie chronology
Human (2019)	Build a Problem (2021)	Hot Mess (2022)

Alternative cover
- Deluxe edition cover

Singles from Build a Problem
- 1. "Guiltless" Released: 24 May 2019; 2. "Boys Like You" Released: 27 September 2019; 3. "Cool Girl" Released: 19 October 2020; 4. "Rainbow" Released: 11 December 2020; 5. "Hate Myself" Released: 12 January 2021; 6. "I Kissed Someone (It Wasn't You)" Released: 16 April 2021

Build a Problem is the debut studio album by the English singer-songwriter dodie. Previously, dodie released three extended plays (EPs): Intertwined (2016), You (2017), and Human (2019). She had also been releasing songs on her YouTube channel since 2011.

The album was originally set to be released on 5 March 2021. After delaying the album's release multiple times, Build a Problem finally came out on 7 May 2021 through dodie's label Doddleoddle and The Orchard. The album's release was preceded by six singles: "Guiltless", "Boys Like You", "Cool Girl", "Rainbow", "Hate Myself", and "I Kissed Someone (It Wasn't You)".

The album received positive reviews and debuted at number three on the UK Albums Chart, dodie's third top ten and highest-charting release.

== Background and release ==
Dodie first announced that she was working on her debut studio album in a video on February 7, 2019. The songs in Build a Problem were written by dodie over the course of two years. Of the writing process she said, "I think I was going through a crisis, actually. I was very unsure of who I was and I was trying to figure it out in music. So I think it’s quite unstable of an album—but it’s definitely honest."

The standard edition of Build a Problem consists of mostly unheard material, except for "When", "Rainbow", and "Cool Girl", all of which were uploaded to her YouTube channel in 2016, 2018, and 2020, respectively. "When"'s live acoustic version also appeared on her 2016 EP Intertwined.

The deluxe edition of Build a Problem contains bonus tracks composed of song demos that were released on dodie's YouTube channel during the COVID-19 pandemic. These were from two sessions called ALOSIA (A Lot of Songs in April/August).

The album was set to be released earlier, but was pushed back to 5 March 2021 due to the aforementioned pandemic. In February 2021, the album release was further pushed back to 26 March 2021, due to the pandemic and unspecified issues regarding vinyl production caused by Brexit. She later announced that the album's release would further be delayed, postponed anew to 7 May 2021, also due to the same issues.

== Promotion ==
In the weeks leading up to the album's announcement, dodie released a number of videos to her YouTube vlog channel, "doddlevloggle", in which she knitted one letter of the album title per video.

On 26 May 2021, dodie made her American TV debut performing "Hate Myself" on Late Night with Seth Meyers. In 2022, dodie embarked on the Build A Problem Tour across North America and Europe.

=== Singles ===
"Guiltless" was released as the lead single from Build a Problem on 24 May 2019. Dodie described the song as "a difficult topic that I could never talk about publicly, so I wrote about it instead. There are those complex relationships in life where there's so much love, but so much anger, disbelief, guilt, expectation and resentment. This is a song exploring that; from a safe, vague-ish distance, I hope."

The second single, "Boys Like You", followed with its 27 September 2019 release. The song is about deconstructing gender roles in romance, "exploring how complicated control and power can be in these types of addictive, quite unhealthy relationships." "Boys Like You" became dodie's first charting single, debuting at number 99 on the Scottish Singles Chart.

"Cool Girl" was released on 19 October 2020 as the album's third single, along with the announcement of the album's title, artwork, and release date. Robin Murray of Clash called it an "imperious slice of deeply individual pop." Luke Holland of The Guardian called the song "a quietly devastating late contender for single of the year" and "so soaringly heartbreaking it makes you want to find whoever made her this sad, slap their Pret out of their hands and tell them in no uncertain terms that they're a stupid idiothead."

"Rainbow" was released as the fourth single from the album on 11 December 2020. The "powerful" LGBT anthem is "the beginning of the six songs on this album that are tied together seamlessly by [a] beautiful 13-piece string section" that dodie composed. It is a remastered version of an original song of the same name performed by Clark on her YouTube channel in 2018.

"Hate Myself" was released as the fifth single from the album on 12 January 2021. The alt pop song "depicts 'someone who seems to find themselves in relationships of any kind with people who deal with their feelings internally—unfortunately resulting in assuming the issue is with them.'" A voice memo demo was released on 26 February 2021 while a dance remix by Georgia was released on 12 March 2021.

"I Kissed Someone (It Wasn't You)" was released as the sixth single from the album on 16 April 2021.

== Critical reception ==
Professional ratings
Aggregate scores
Source	Rating
Metacritic	80/100
Review scores
Source	Rating
AllMusic	4/5 stars
Clash	8/10
DIY	3.5/5 stars
Dork	4/5 stars
Evening Standard	4/5 stars
Gigwise	8/10 stars
The Guardian	3/5 stars
The Line of Best Fit	9/10
Pitchfork	6.6/10

Upon its release, Build a Problem received a Metacritic rating of 80 out of 100 based on seven reviews, indicating "generally favorable reviews". David Smyth, writing for the Evening Standard, praised dodie for having a sound that is "still intimate, her voice small and soft, and so understated that one title is simply a full stop" while also working in intricate production. Malvika Padin of Gigwise praised the album for "spanning joy, sadness, anger with stops at every turn of dodie’s life" and gave credit to Dodie's songwriting for its "ability to balance precious moments of joy with therapeutic musicality". Dork's Phoebe De Angelis characterised the album's intimacy as "like a series of diary entries". Caleb Campbell of The Line of Best Fit heralded the album, saying that "Build A Problem indeed finds dodie at her most open and fully realised" that is appealing to both old and new fans. In a more mixed review for Pitchfork, Ashley Bardhan said that "Clark often finds herself swallowed by misery and bitter self-effacement in the lyrics" and "prioritizing lush vocal harmonies". Despite their mixed rating for the album, Tara Joshi of The Guardian nevertheless recognised that the album has an "ambition here beyond mere John Lewis ad-style twee acoustic pop" and named "Special Girl" as a standout track.

== Track listing ==
All tracks are written by Dorothy Miranda Clark (dodie). All songs produced by Joe Rubel, except track 14 (produced by Rubel and Pomplamoose). All ALOSIA songs produced by dodie, except track 6 (produced by Joe Rubel).

Standard edition
No.	Title	Length
1.	"Air So Sweet"	1:05
2.	"Hate Myself"	3:28
3.	"I Kissed Someone (It Wasn't You)"	2:30
4.	"Cool Girl"	3:19
5.	"Special Girl"	3:13
6.	"Rainbow"	2:46
7.	"?"	1:12
8.	"Four Tequilas Down"	2:22
9.	"."	1:23
10.	"Sorry"	2:45
11.	"When"	3:43
12.	"Before the Line"	3:36
13.	"Guiltless" (bonus)	3:29
14.	"Boys Like You" (bonus)	3:00
Total length:		37:51

ALOSIA deluxe edition bonus disc
No.	Title	Length
1.	"Bored Like Me" (Demo)	2:02
2.	"Let Go" (Demo)	2:41
3.	"Bite Back" (Demo)	3:00
4.	"One Last Time, Please" (Demo)	2:43
5.	"All My Daughters" (Demo)	3:10
6.	"Anything" (Demo)	2:31
7.	"In the Bed" (Demo)	2:24
8.	"Don't Quite Belong" (Demo)	3:25
Total length:		21:56

Apple Music Film Edition bonus track
No.	Title	Length
9.	"dodie on I Kissed Someone (It Wasn't You)" (video)	1:48
Total length:		23:46

Notes

- All ALOSIA songs are stylized in all lowercase
- On download and streaming editions of the album, the deluxe version is the only version, whereas the LP and CD versions of the album offer both the standard and deluxe editions. The cassette version is only available in the standard edition.

== Personnel ==
=== Musicians ===
- dodie – lead vocals, background vocals, ukulele, piano, keyboards, guitars, bass, clarinet, percussion, string arrangement
- Elena Abad – violin
- Ross Craib – drums
- Pete Daynes – bass (track 4), percussion (track 4)
- Evan Edinger – background vocals (tracks 1–2, 4–5)
- Joshua Edwards – background vocals (track 13)
- Sophie English – cello
- Matt Glasbey – drum programming (tracks 1, 3), keyboards (tracks 1, 3)
- Ethan Gruska – background vocals (track 8)
- Will Harvey – viola, violin
- Daniel J. Layton – background vocals (tracks 1–2, 5)
- Elle Mills – background vocals (track 13)
- Pomplamoose – bass (tracks 5, 14), drums (tracks 5, 14), percussion (tracks 5, 14)
- Joe Rubel – drum programming, percussion, keyboards, piano, programming, bass
- The Parallax Orchestra – strings (tracks 6–12)
  - Violins: Will Harvey, Eloise-Fleur Thom, Zara Benyounes, Guy Batton, Elena Abad, Connie Chatwin
  - Violas: Richard Jones, Elitsa Bogdanova, Caleb Sibley
  - Cellos: Sophie English, Max Ruisi, Fraser Bowles
  - Double bass: Jessica Price

=== Production ===
- dodie – engineer (tracks 1–4, 6–8, 10–12)
- Jack Conte – engineer (track 4)
- Dan Ewans – assistant engineer (tracks 1, 5, 8, 10, 12)
- Billy Foster – assistant engineer (track 4, 12)
- Matt Glasbey – engineer (tracks 1–3, 5–7, 10, 12)
- Nathaniel Graham – assistant engineer (tracks 6–12)
- Ethan Gruska – engineer (track 8)
- Alex Hollingsworth – assistant engineer (tracks 10–12)
- Cassian Irvine – mastering (all tracks)
- Ben Loveland – assistant engineer (tracks 2–3, 10, 12)
- Emma Marks – assistant engineer (tracks 6–12)
- Jamie McEvoy – engineer (tracks 3, 6–12)
- Joe Rubel – engineer (all tracks), producer (all tracks), mixing (all tracks)

== Charts ==
Chart performance for Build a Problem
Chart (2021)	Peak position
Belgian Albums (Ultratop Flanders)	177
Dutch Albums (Album Top 100)	69
Scottish Albums (OCC)	3
UK Albums (OCC)	3
US Billboard 200	115
US Americana/Folk Albums (Billboard)	4
US Independent Albums (Billboard)	13

== Release history ==
Release dates and formats for Build a Problem
Region	Date	Format	Version	Label	Ref.
Various	7 May 2021	CD; LP; cassette	Standard	Doddleoddle; The Orchard	
Various	7 May 2021	CD; LP; digital download; streaming	Deluxe	Doddleoddle; The Orchard	
Various	7 May 2021	Digital download; streaming	Apple Music Film Edition	Doddleoddle; The Orchard	
