= Songs to Make Life Slightly Less Awkward =

Album by Frank Hamilton

Studio album by Frank Hamilton
- Released: 30 September 2016
- Recorded: May–July 2015
- Genre: Indie; Pop
- Length: 37:21
- Label: Bedroom Indie
- Producer: Frank Hamilton; James Earp

Singles from Songs To Make Life Slightly Less Awkward
- 1. "Songs We Fall Asleep To" Released: 3 October 2015; 2. "Lovedrug" Released: 18 March 2016; 3. "Saturday Night" Released: 16 September 2016; 4. "More or Less [feat Dodie Clark]" Released: 10 May 2017

Songs to Make Life Slightly Less Awkward is the second album by English musician Frank Hamilton. It was released digitally on 30 September 2016 and debuted at number 19 in the Indie Breakers Chart. The physical copies were released in stores three weeks later on 21 October 2016 and featured as part of HMV's recommended listening

The album was lauded by critics including The Independent, The Mirror and BBC 6 Music.

STMLSLA featured the singles "Songs We Fall Asleep To", "Lovedrug", "Saturday Night" and "More or Less", a duet with Dodie Clark, which was released alongside a written piece for Mental Health Awareness Week.

== Track list ==
No.	Title	Length
1.	"AOTC"	2:39
2.	"Lovedrug"	2:47
3.	"10 Days"	2:42
4.	"Had Enough"	3:04
5.	"Songs We Fall Asleep To"	2:48
6.	"Saturday Night"	3:13
7.	"Recycling"	3:19
8.	"Red"	2:34
9.	"What If"	2:42
10.	"We Started a Band"	2:58
11.	"21C"	3:01
12.	"The Only Cloud"	2:47
13.	"More or Less [feat Dodie Clark]"	2:47
