= Here to Destroy =

Studio album by Split Dogs
- Released: 28 February 2025
- Genre: Rock
- Length: 21:53
- Label: Venn
- Producer: Peter Miles

Split Dogs chronology
'Split Dogs' (2023)	Here to Destroy (2025)

Singles from Here to Destroy
- 1. "Precious Stones" Released: 6 November 2024

Here to Destroy is the second studio album by British punk rock group Split Dogs, comprising Harry Atkins, Mil Martinez, Suez Boyle and Chris Hugall. It was released on 28 February 2025 via Venn Records in LP, CD and digital formats. The recording process of the album occurred over a period of three days. "Precious Stones" was released as a single on 6 November 2024, alongside a music video directed by Chris Hugall.

== Reception ==
Professional ratings
Review scores
Source	Rating
Clash	8/10
Distorted	7/10
Kerrang!	4/5

Louder Than War's Nathan Brown remarked, "The new album from Split Dogs has a punk pulse in its stripped back rock and roll and garage attack. Nathan Brown predicts we will hear more from this Bristol outfit." Katie Bird of Distorted noted Here to Destroy as "a strong album by a new and exciting name in rock music," stating that "the high energy and fast pace of the album keeps the audience engaged, and although sometimes the songs blend into each other, especially near the start."

The album received a 4/5 score from Kerrang!, whose reviewer Olly Thomas commented, "The songs on Here to Destroy pile into each other to form a non-stop blast of raucous energy, providing a parallel to their hard-gigging, no-nonsense approach to the business of being in a band." In her review for Clash with a rating of eight, Susan Hansen referred to the album as "an honest and hard-hitting, back-to-basics for rock" and "an all-consuming record that is impossible to forget, it lingers, with great intent."

== Track listing ==
All tracks are written by Mil Martinez.

Here to Destroy track listing
No.	Title	Length
1.	"Stay Tuned"	1:38
2.	"Monster Truck"	2:42
3.	"Animal"	2:15
4.	"Be a Sport"	3:16
5.	"Meg"	1:30
6.	"Lafayette"	3:01
7.	"And What?"	1:56
8.	"Precious Stones"	2:04
9.	"All In"	3:31
Total length:		21:53

== Personnel ==
Credits adapted from the album's liner notes.

=== Split Dogs ===
- Harry Martinez – vocals
- Mil Martinez – guitars, backing vocals
- Suez Boyle – bass
- Chris Hugall – drums

=== Additional contributors ===
- Peter Miles – production
- Jess Rushby – photography
- Maciek Mastalerz – photography

== Charts ==
Chart performance for Here to Destroy
Chart (2025)	Peak position
UK Independent Albums (OCC)	37
UK Rock & Metal Albums (OCC)	13
