= Soren Bryce =

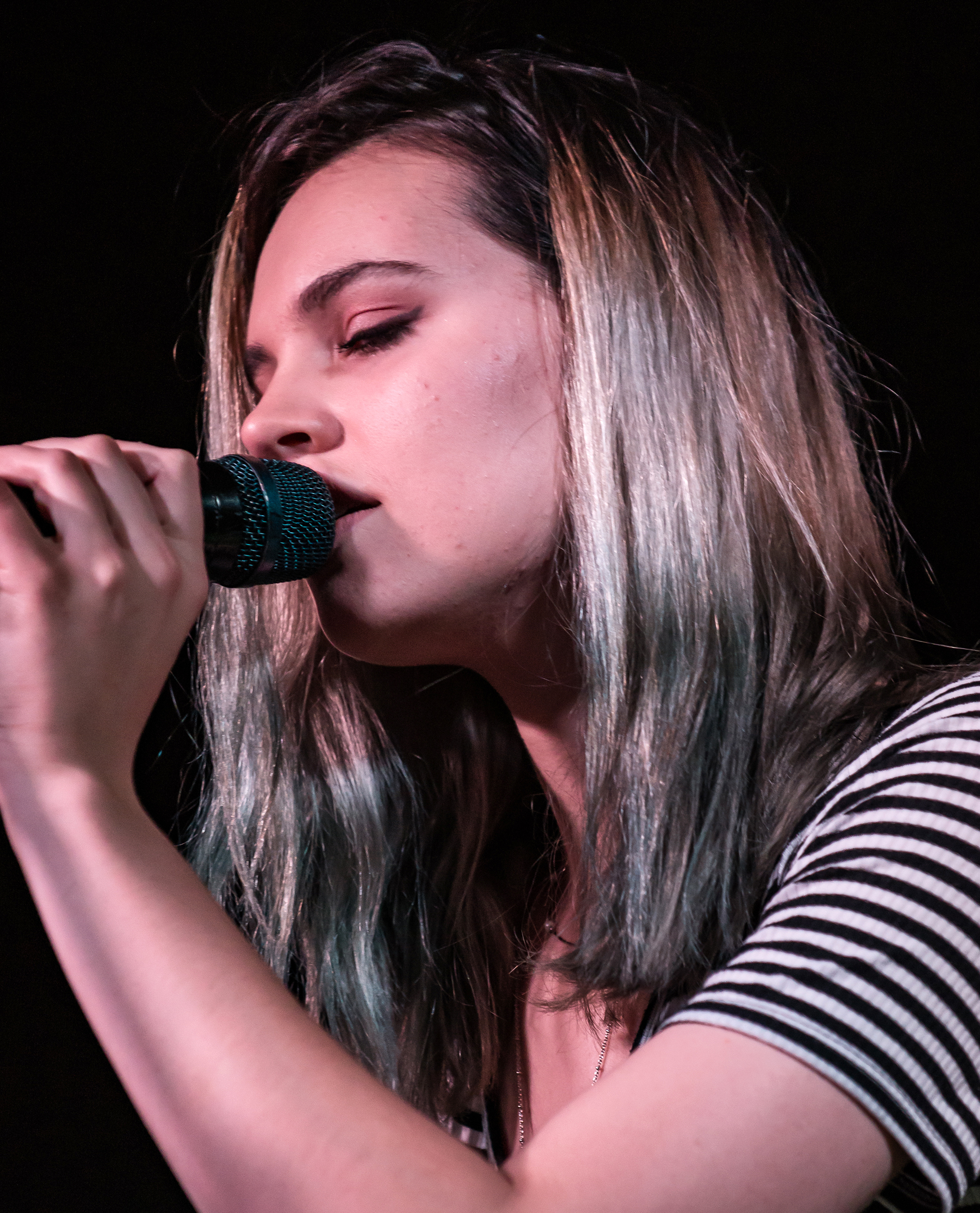
- Bryce performing live in 2017.

Background information
- Origin: Amarillo, TX
- Genres: Electronic; alternative; singer songwriter
- Occupations: Musician; multi-instrumentalist
- Instruments: Vocals; guitar; keyboards; bass
- Years active: 2015–present
- Label: Washington Square
- Website: sorenbryce.com

Soren Bryce is an American electronic indie pop musician from Amarillo, Texas. Bryce was previously signed to Washington Square records, an imprint of Razor & Tie.

== History ==
Bryce began her career by releasing her debut self-titled EP in August 2015 on Washington Square, after raising over $10,000 via PledgeMusic. The album was produced by David Kahne. Bryce released the first song from the EP via Kick Kick Snare. Bryce released the second song and lead single from the EP via NPR's All Songs Considered. Bryce released a third song from the EP via Billboard. Bryce released a fourth song from the EP via Bullett Magazine. The EP received three out of four stars by ABC News music reviewer Allan Raible.

Bryce came in third place in The Deli Magazine's "Los Angeles Readers/Fans Poll".

In 2017, Bryce released a song titled Cellophane.

On June 13, 2018 Bryce released the follow-up album to her self titled EP named Discussions With Myself. The album is composed of 11 tracks made in 2016. Also in 2018, she started the project tummyache.

In 2019, she released an EP as tummyache, Humpday.

After Bryce moved to the UK, tummyache expanded into a full band, with the addition first of bassist Linus Fenton, followed by guitarist Bianka Baranova, and drummer Arthur James.

In 2022, the first full length album by tummyache, Soak, was released.

In 2023, she contributed to the debut studio album, The Secret to Life, by the rock band Fizz, doing the lead vocals on the opening track "A New Phase Awaits You :-)", playing percussion on "Hell of a Ride", adding backing vocals to "As Good as It Gets", and playing bass on "You, Me, Lonely" (which she also co-produced).

In May of 2024, tummyache's second album, Egosystem, was released, featuring guest appearances by Joseph Carroll (of Maruja) and Clari Freeman-Taylor & Saya Barbaglia (of Mary in the Junkyard). In November of that year she released To Cherish, her first release under her own name since 2018.

In 2025 tummyache released a third album, Fake New.

The fourth tummyache album, Repeat in Reverse, is set to release in October of 2026

== Personal life ==
As of 2026, she is married to tummyache bassist Linus Fenton.

== Discography ==
=== As Soren Bryce ===
==== EPs ====
- Soren Bryce (2015, Washington Square)

==== Albums ====
- Discussions with Myself (2018, Independent)
- To Cherish (2024, Lil Chop)

=== With tummyache ===
==== EPs ====
- Humpday (2019, Independent)

==== Albums ====
- Soak (2022, Independent)
- Egosystem (2024, Independent)
- Fake New (2025, eNtiTy Records)
- Repeat in Reverse (2026, TBA)
