= Frank Hamilton (British singer) =

Songs & Silly Ideas

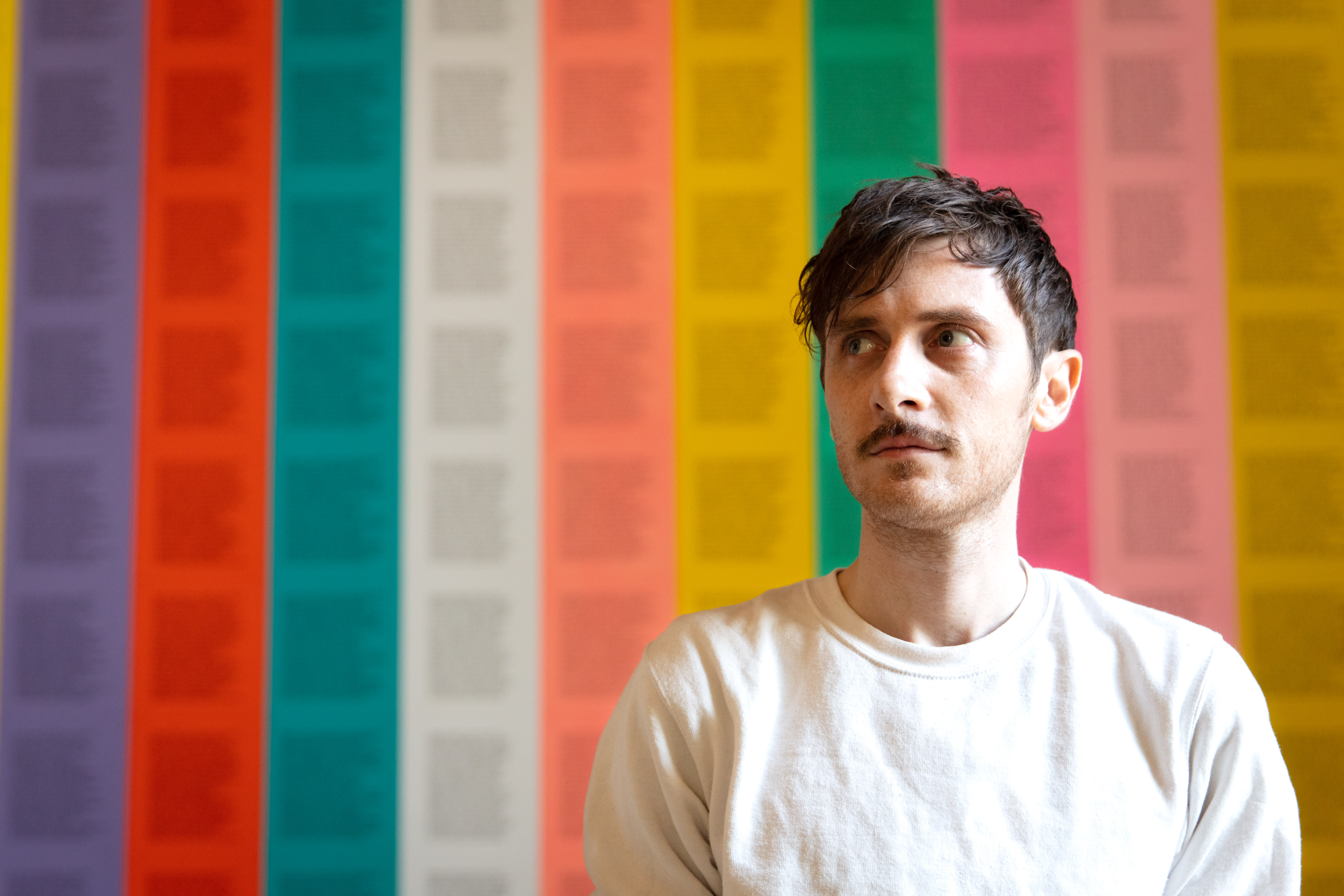

Background information
- Born: Frank Hamilton; 4 October 1985 (age 40); Huntingdon, Cambridgeshire, England
- Origin: London, England
- Genres: Indie pop, Folk, Acoustic
- Occupations: Artist, Producer
- Instruments: Vocals, guitar
- Years active: 2008–present
- Label: Bedroom Indie
- Website: frankhamilton.co.uk

Frank Hamilton (born 4 October 1985) is an English singer, songwriter and producer living in London. He is best known for pioneering the rapid-release strategy with #OneSongaWeek - a year long project in which he wrote, recorded and released a song a week. Since then he has released two studio LPs and come full circle, announcing the return of One Song a Week II in 2019.

== Early life and career beginnings ==
Frank Hamilton was born in Huntingdon, Cambridgeshire, England. He took an early interest in music, singing along to the likes of Buddy Holly, Bob Dylan and Paul Simon in the back of his parents Volvo. He attended St Ivo School and was a keen sportsman, at one point ranked No. 8 in England at table tennis. Whilst in his late teens, Hamilton turned back to music and after discovering Blink 182, bought a guitar and began writing songs.

== Musical career ==
=== You, Your Cat & Me EP ===
Hamilton released his first single "Two Kids" in 2007, quickly followed by "Friday Nights" which was chosen as Radio X's 'Christmas Record of the Week'. Next came "Waking Up @ 3", championed by Huw Stephens and Steve Lamacq on BBC R1 and BBC R2, while "You, Your Cat & Me" also made the Radio X Playlist by mistake (at the same time as "Waking Up @ 3").

Debut EP You, Your Cat & Me was released in May 2008 alongside two sold out appearances at The Great Escape festival, prompting Music Week to label Hamilton 'the Mike Skinner of folk'. In 2010, the EP's title track was used as part of the general election campaign.

=== #OneSongaWeek ===
In 2012, Hamilton embarked on a musical journey with #OneSongaWeek, which saw him write, record and release a song a week for the entire calendar year. The idea was born on 2 January with the first song, "All or Nothing", arriving on 6 January.

"I didn't really think it through too much before I started (which is probably a good thing or it might never have happened)"

The project starting out in his living room and finishing with a No. 1 album on iTunes, featuring songs written with Ed Sheeran and Newton Faulkner. The Best of #OneSongaWeek album was released on 10 December 2012 and charted at No. 1 in the Singer/Songwriter Albums Chart, No. 21 in the UK Albums Chart and No. 2 in the Official Charts Company Indie Breakers Charts, with lead single "Flaws & Ceilings" amassing over 100,000 iTunes downloads.

=== Summer and London Eye EPs ===
2013 saw the release of Summer EP, which featured the only cover of Wheatus' "Teenage Dirtbag" to feature Wheatus themselves, as well as the #LondonEyeEP, which saw Hamilton record a live EP with a string quartet in the 28 minutes it takes to travel one revolution.

=== Songs To Make Life Slightly Less Awkward ===
In 2015, Hamilton recorded his next album and performed live on BBC Radio 2's Breakfast Show as well as final series of Channel 4's TFI Friday. The album's first single, "Songs We Fall Asleep To", was released in late 2015 and the video features members of the public (both fans and strangers) lying in bed in a park and listening to the song for the first time.

Songs To Make Life Slightly Less Awkward came out on 30 September 2016, with the physical release hitting stores three weeks later on 21 October.

Second single "Lovedrug" was championed by BBC 6 Music and the third and final single, "More or Less" was premiered by The Independent alongside a piece written by Hamilton for Mental Health Awareness Week.

=== One Song a Week II ===
In October 2019, Hamilton announced his comeback with the return of #OneSongaWeek (One Song a Week II).

== Tours and festivals ==
Hamilton has embarked on several headline tours and shared stages with Ed Sheeran, Take That, The Wombats and countless others. He has also supported the likes of Scouting for Girls, Lucy Spraggan, Lewis Watson, and most recently Wheatus on their European tour.

He has performed at several festivals including: Secret Garden Party, Reading & Leeds Festival, Belladrum, Isle of Wight Festival, The Great Escape, and CarFest.

Hamilton also hosts an annual Christmas show, 'Crikey It's Christmas', which began in his living room in 2010 and was held at Scala in 2016.

== Discography ==
=== Studio albums ===
Title	Album details
Best of #OneSongaWeek	Released: 10 December 2012; Label: Self-released; Formats: Digital download, CD
Songs to Make Life Slightly Less Awkward	Released: 30 September 2016; Label: Bedroom Indie; Formats: Digital Download, CD, Vinyl, Cassette

=== Extended plays ===
Title	Details
You, Your Cat & Me	Released: 18 May 2008; Label: Fahrenheit 55 Records; Format: Digital download, CD
Songs from the Bedroom	Released: 11 November 2010; Label: Self-Release; Format: CD
Words and Nothing More	Released: 3 December 2011; Label: Self-Release; Format: CD
London Eye EP	Released: 19 June 2013; Label: Self-Release; Format: Video
Summer	Released: 8 August 2013; Label: Fork You Records; Format: Digital download, CD

=== Singles ===
Year	Title	Album
2007	"Two Kids"	-
2008	"Friday Nights"	You, Your Cat & Me EP
2008	"Waking Up @ 3"	You, Your Cat & Me EP
2009	"Christmas in London"	-
2012	"Flaws & Ceilings [feat Lauren Aqulina]"	Best of #OneSongaWeek
2012	"(I Wish This Was) A Christmas Song [feat Ebony Day]"	Best of #OneSongaWeek
2013	"Summer"	Summer EP
2015	"Songs We Fall Asleep To"	Songs To Make Life Slightly More Awkward
2016	"Lovedrug"	Songs To Make Life Slightly More Awkward
2016	"Saturday Night"	Songs To Make Life Slightly More Awkward
2017	"More or Less [feat Dodie Clark]"	Songs To Make Life Slightly More Awkward
2019	"Aliens"	One Song a Week II
2019	"Song for the Runners Up"	One Song a Week II
