= Not for Lack of Trying =

Studio album by Dodie
- Released: 3 October 2025
- Studio: Pixel: Dodie's bedroom
- Genre: Bedroom pop; folk pop
- Length: 38:13
- Label: Doddleoddle; Decca; Universal Music Group
- Producer: Dodie; Peter Miles; Joe Rubel

Dodie chronology
Hot Mess (2022)	Not for Lack of Trying (2025)

Singles from Not for Lack of Trying
- 1. "I'm Fine!" Released: 4 June 2025; 2. "I Feel Bad for You, Dave" Released: 15 August 2025; 3. "Darling, Angel, Baby" Released: 12 September 2025

Not for Lack of Trying is the second studio album by the English singer-songwriter Dodie. The album was preceded by singles "I'm Fine!", "I Feel Bad for You, Dave" and "Darling, Angel, Baby". Other than two tracks for other projects, these marked her first material as a solo artist since 2022. The album consists of new material, except for "Tall Kids" which was first published as a demo on Dodie's YouTube channel.

== Critical reception ==
Professional ratings
Review scores
Source	Rating
AllMusic	4/5 stars
Clash	8/10
DIY	3/5 stars
The Skinny	3/5 stars

Upon its release, Not for Lack of Trying received a Metacritic rating of 76 out of 100 based on 4 reviews, indicating "generally favorable reviews". Lana Williams, writing for Clash, said that the album "shows dodie at her most raw and vulnerable, and frankly, her best". In a more mixed review for DIY, Sophie Flint Vázquez said that "she's still writing her way through uncertainty" while praising the orchestral elements on several tracks. Matt Collar, writing for AllMusic, called the album "gorgeously subtle, often transfixing".

== Track listing ==
All tracks are written by Dodie; "Darling, Angel, Baby" written with Greta Isaac.

Not for Lack of Trying track listing
No.	Title	Length
1.	"I'M FINE!"	3:00
2.	"Smart Girl"	2:57
3.	"Darling, Angel, Baby" (featuring Greta Isaac)	2:36
4.	"Hold Fire"	2:56
5.	"Tall Kids"	3:37
6.	"I Feel Bad for You, Dave"	3:03
7.	"Now"	2:59
8.	"The List"	3:47
9.	"Different"	2:46
10.	"The End"	5:02
11.	"The Answer"	3:21
12.	"Not for Lack of Trying"	2:05
13.	"Maybe, Finally" (added as a bonus track on 5 December 2025)	3:05
Total length:		41:19

== Personnel ==
Credits adapted from Tidal.

=== Musicians ===
- Dodie – vocals (all tracks), guitar (tracks 1–7, 10, 12), piano (1–3, 5, 6, 8–11), background vocals (1, 3–7, 9–12), percussion (1, 2, 4, 6, 10, 11), keyboards (3, 5, 9, 12), clarinet (3, 8), drums (10)
- Joe Rubel – guitar (1–6), programming (1–5, 8–10, 12), background vocals (1, 3, 5, 11, 12), percussion (1, 2, 4, 6), keyboards (3–6, 9), bass (12)
- Matt Glasbey – programming (1–5)
- Mat Swales – drums (1–4, 6, 10)
- Katt Newlon – cello (1–3, 6–8, 10, 11)
- Phoebe Snelling – violin (1–3, 6–8, 11)
- Freya Hicks – viola (1, 3, 6, 8, 11)
- Kasia Ziminska – violin (1, 3, 6, 8, 11)
- Jordan Bergmans – viola (2, 7)
- Evie Hilyer-Ziegler – violin (2, 7)
- Bertie Gilbert – background vocals (2, 10)
- Pete Daynes – bass (3, 4)
- Greta Isaac – vocals, background vocals, guitar (3)
- Will Tuckwell – guitar, piano (6)
- Will Sharp – bass (6)
- Will Harvey – violin (8–10)
- Maya Kashif – cello (8, 9)
- Stephen Upshaw – viola (8, 9)
- James Toll – violin (8, 9)
- Peter Miles – keyboards (9); bass, percussion (11)
- Anisa Arslanargic – viola (10)
- Elena Abad – violin (10)
- Isambard Warburton – drums, guitar, percussion (11)
- Astrid Clark – background vocals (11)
- Elio Evangelou – guitar (11)

=== Technical ===
- Dodie – production (1–7, 10, 11), engineering (all tracks), additional production (8)
- Joe Rubel – production (1–9); engineering, mixing (all tracks); additional production (10, 11)
- Peter Miles – production (6, 10, 11), engineering (6, 8–11), additional production (8, 9)
- Jamie McEvoy – engineering (1, 3, 6, 8, 9, 11)
- Matt Glasbey – engineering (1–5, 7, 9–11)
- Emre Ramazanoglu – mixing
- Lewis Hopkin – mastering

== Charts ==
Chart performance for Not for Lack of Trying
Chart (2025)	Peak position
Scottish Albums (OCC)	14
UK Albums (OCC)	42
