= The Morning (Lewis Watson album) =

Studio album by Lewis Watson
- Released: 16 June 2014
- Genre: Rock
- Length: 46:02
- Label: Warner Bros.

Professional ratings
Aggregate scores
Source	Rating
Metacritic	58/100
Review scores
Source	Rating
AllMusic	3/5 stars

The Morning is the debut studio album by English musician Lewis Watson. It was released on 7 June 2014 under Warner Bros. Records. It charted at number 28 on the UK Albums Chart.

== Critical reception ==
The Morning was met with "mixed or average" reviews from critics. At Metacritic, which assigns a weighted average rating out of 100 to reviews from mainstream publications, this release received an average score of 58, based on 5 reviews.

== Track list ==
No.	Title	Length
1.	"Stones Around the Sun"	3:45
2.	"Holding On"	3:41
3.	"Into the Wild"	3:49
4.	"Outgrow"	3:52
5.	"Ghost"	4:16
6.	"Stay"	4:15
7.	"Windows"	4:03
8.	"Close"	3:28
9.	"Halo"	3:19
10.	"Sink or Swim"	3:44
11.	"Castle Street"	7:50

== Charts ==
Chart performance for The Morning
Chart (2014)	Peak position
Scottish Albums (Official Charts)	40
UK Albums (Official Charts)	28
