= Human (Dodie EP) =

EP by Dodie
- Released: 18 January 2019
- Genre: Folk-pop
- Length: 23:05
- Label: Self-released; The Orchard
- Producer: Dodie Clark; Fred Cox; David Kosten; Joe Rubel; Hugh Worskett

Dodie chronology
You (2017)	Human (2019)	Build a Problem (2021)

Singles from Human
- 1. "Human" Released: 21 September 2018; 2. "If I'm Being Honest" Released: 2 November 2018

Professional ratings
Review scores
Source	Rating
God is in the TV	7/10
The Guardian	3/5 stars

Human is the third extended play by English singer-songwriter Dodie Clark, known mononymously as dodie. The album was released by Clark's record label Doddleoddle on 18 January 2019 and distributed by The Orchard. It peaked at number 5 on the UK Official Albums Chart, Clark's highest charting album to date in her home country and her third consecutive entry in the top 40.

== Background ==
Human is composed of seven tracks, four of which had premiered on Clark's YouTube channel in the past. "She," an acoustic love song about her love for another woman, was uploaded on 27 September 2014 when Clark was 19. The title track "Human" was originally uploaded on 23 July 2016 featuring Jon Cozart. "Burned Out" was originally uploaded on 1 December 2017. "Not What I Meant" was originally uploaded as a duet with Dom Fera called "Bitter Content" on 25 January 2018. In a video uploaded on 22 January 2019 Clark revealed that throughout the past nine months she had been hiding a "secret song" in her videos by peppering her videos with spontaneous singing of one word or phrase. When all the clips are put together it reveals the album opening track "Arms Unfolding"

== Promotion ==
The album title track "Human" was released as the lead single on 21 September 2018 alongside the album pre-order and an accompanying music video directed by Hazel Hayes.

"If I'm Being Honest" was released as the second single from the album on 2 November 2018 with a live session music video directed by Sammy Paul. A full length science fiction inspired video directed by Dom Fera was released on 30 November 2018. "If I'm Being Honest" was nominated for the 2019 Independent Music Award for Best Song – Folk/Singer-Songwriter.

A music video for "Monster" directed by PJ Liguori was released on 21 January 2019.

To promote the album, Clark embarked on the Human Tour across the UK, Europe, and North America throughout 2019.

== Track listing ==
All songs written by Clark. Credits sourced from Spotify.

No.	Title	Producer(s)	Length
1.	"Arms Unfolding"	Dodie Clark	1:35
2.	"Monster"	Joe Rubel	4:05
3.	"Not What I Meant" (featuring Lewis Watson)	Hugh Worskett	2:23
4.	"Human" (featuring Tom Walker)	Rubel	3:22
5.	"She"	David Kosten	3:32
6.	"If I'm Being Honest"	Fred Cox	4:38
7.	"Burned Out"	Kosten	3:30
Total length:			23:05

== Charts ==
Chart (2019)	Peak position
Australian Albums (ARIA)	50
Belgian Albums (Ultratop Flanders)	108
Canadian Albums (Billboard)	60
Irish Albums (IRMA)	13
Lithuanian Albums (AGATA)	71
Swiss Albums (Schweizer Hitparade)	81
UK Albums (OCC)	5
US Billboard 200	82
US Independent Albums (Billboard)	4
US Americana/Folk Albums (Billboard)	2
