= Hot Mess (EP) =

EP by Dodie
- Released: 30 September 2022
- Genre: Pop
- Length: 12:37
- Label: Doddleoddle
- Producer: Dodie Clark; Philip Etherington; Peter Miles

Dodie chronology
Build a Problem (2021)	Hot Mess (2022)	Not for Lack of Trying (2025)

Singles from Hot Mess
- 1. "Got Weird" Released: 29 July 2022; 2. "Hot Mess" Released: 2 September 2022

Professional ratings
Review scores
Source	Rating
Clash	9/10
Gigwise	8/10 stars

Hot Mess is the fourth extended play by English singer-songwriter Dodie Clark, known mononymously as dodie. The album was released by Clark's record label Doddleoddle on 30 September 2022.

== Track listing ==
All songs written by Dodie Clark, except "Got Weird", written by Clark and Peter Miles.

No.	Title	Producer(s)	Length
1.	"Hot Mess"	Dodie Clark; Philip Etherington; Peter Miles	2:55
2.	"Got Weird"	Clark; Miles	3:22
3.	"Lonely Bones"	Miles	3:05
4.	"No Big Deal (I Love You)"	Clark; Miles	3:15
Total length:			12:37

== Personnel ==
- Dodie – lead vocals, background vocals, mixing engineer
- Peter Miles – background vocals, mixing engineer, mastering engineer
- Greta Isaac – background vocals

== Charts ==
Chart performance for Hot Mess
Chart (2023)	Peak position
UK Singles Sales (OCC)	64
