= The Secret to Life =

Studio album by Fizz
- Released: 27 October 2023
- Studios: Middle Farm (South Devon, England)
- Length: 38:21
- Labels: Decca; Universal Music Group
- Producers: Fizz; Peter Miles

Singles from The Secret to Life
- 1. "High in Brighton" Released: 2023; 2. "Hell of a Ride" Released: 2023; 3. "Close One" Released: 2023; 4. "As Good as It Gets" Released: 2023; 5. "You, Me, Lonely" Released: 2023

The Secret to Life is the debut studio album by the indie pop supergroup Fizz, released on 27 October 2023 by Decca Records and Universal Music Group. It was recorded over a two-week period at Middle Farm Studios in South Devon with Peter Miles.

In the production of The Secret to Life, the band bypassed many production tools commonly used in contemporary pop music and relied on real instruments and recording live takes of songs directly onto tape. This approach, as discussed in interviews, imparts a nostalgic quality reminiscent of the music of the 1960s and 1970s.

== Critical reception ==
Professional ratings
Review scores
Source	Rating
AllMusic	4/5 stars
DIY	4/5 stars
The Irish Times	4/5 stars
The Line of Best Fit	8/10

Critical reception of The Secret to Life was generally positive.

The album was praised for its distinctive sound, vocals, and emotive lyrics, but was also described as occasionally cliché.

== Track listing ==
All tracks are written by Fizz, Peter Miles and Mathew Swales, except where noted.

The Secret to Life track listing
No.	Title	Writer(s)	Lead vocals	Length
1.	"A New Phase Awaits You :-)"		N/A	1:08
2.	"The Secret to Life"		Brown, Clark, Gartland, Isaac	2:52
3.	"High in Brighton"		Gartland, Brown, Isaac, Clark	2:51
4.	"Strawberry Jam"		Gartland	4:35
5.	"Close One"		Gartland	3:55
6.	"I Just Died"		Clark	3:36
7.	"Rocket League"		Brown	0:51
8.	"Hell of a Ride"		Brown, Gartland	2:59
9.	"As Good as It Gets"		Isaac	2:44
10.	"You, Me, Lonely"	Fizz; Soren Bryce; Mathew Swales	Clark	3:40
11.	"Lights Out"		Isaac, Brown	3:46
12.	"The Grand Finale"		Brown, Clark, Gartland, Isaac	5:23
Total length:				38:21

== Personnel ==
Fizz

- Greta Isaac – lead and backing vocals; acoustic and electric guitars; percussion
- Martin Luke Brown – lead and backing vocals; acoustic guitar; piano; electric piano, organ; percussion
- Dodie – lead and backing vocals; electric guitar; clarinet; synthesizer; piano; percussion
- Orla Gartland – lead and backing vocals, acoustic and electric guitars, bass; percussion

Additional musicians

- Peter Miles – bass; electric guitar; synthesizer
- Mathew Swales – drums; percussion; tom drum
- Soren Bryce – vocals; bass; percussion
- Dan Hillman – baritone saxophone
- Simon Dobson – trumpet

Production

- Peter Miles – producer; mixing
- Fizz – producer
- Matt Huber – mixing
- Soren Bryce – assistant engineer
- Kevin Tuffy – mastering

== Charts ==
Chart performance for The Secret to Life
Chart (2023)	Peak position
Scottish Albums (Official Charts)	8
UK Albums (Official Charts)	31
