= Lewis Watson (musician) =

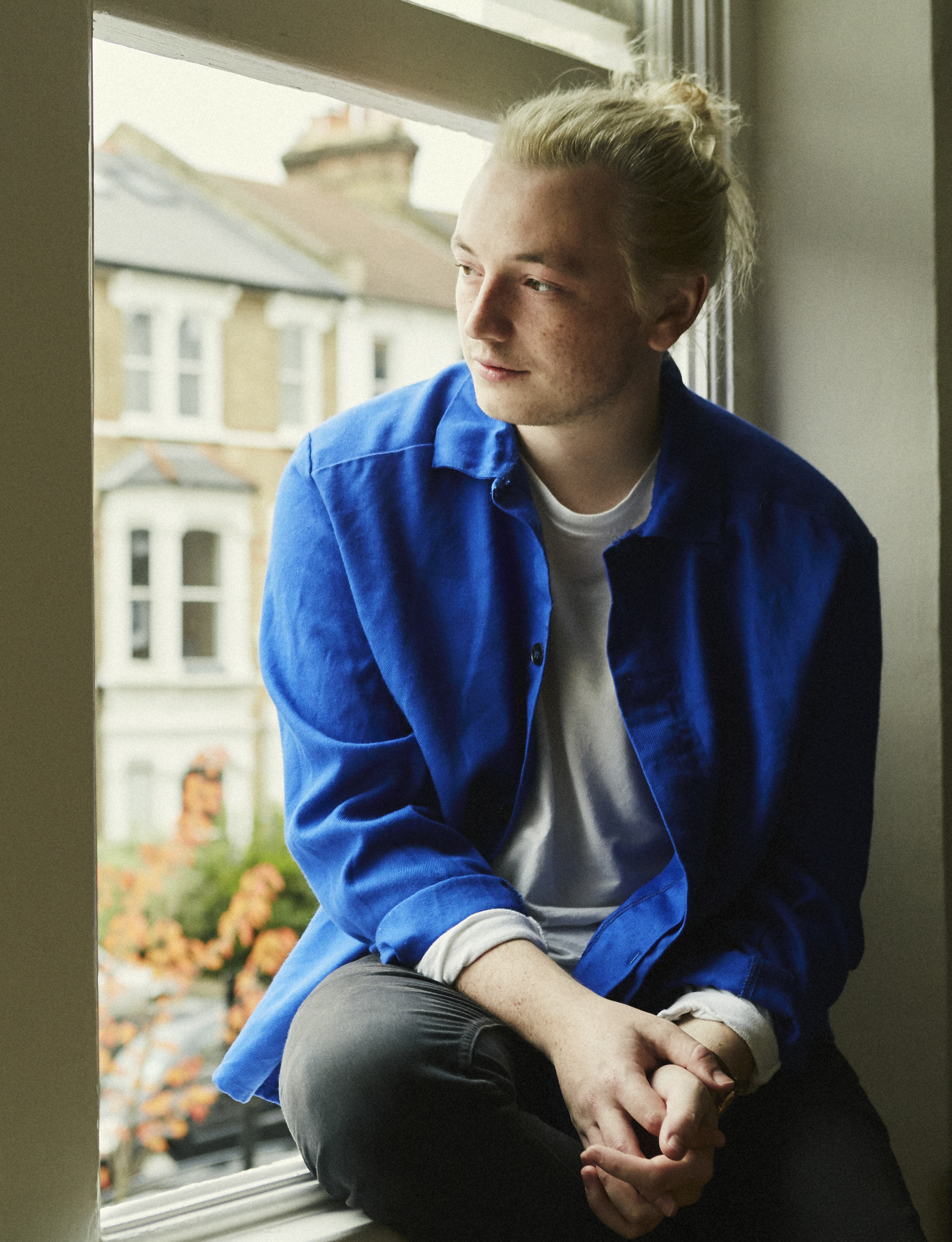

Background information
- Born: Lewis Michael Watson; 19 October 1992 (age 33); Preston, England
- Origin: Bicester, England
- Genres: Pop, folk, acoustic
- Occupations: Singer-songwriter, musician
- Instruments: Vocals, guitar
- Years active: 2011–present
- Label: Cooking Vinyl
- Website: lewiswatsonmusic.com

Lewis Watson (born 19 October 1992) is an English singer-songwriter. Watson was raised in Bicester, Oxfordshire, and currently has a YouTube channel labeled Lewis Watson. He has released multiple EPs and singles, as well as 5 full-length albums (2 of those are acoustic versions of his albums), with his latest being the love that you want and the love that you want (acoustic). He married his long-term partner, Sophie Watts, on 20 November 2021.

== Music career ==
=== 2010–2012: Career beginnings ===
Watson first started playing after receiving a guitar for his sixteenth birthday. "I've never had lessons", he admits. "I just enjoyed playing guitar so much. I'd play for hours a night, and try out new things to make sure it didn't get stale." Watson uploaded a video of himself singing a cover of Bombay Bicycle Club's "Swansea" on YouTube in 2010 (using the name "HolyLoowis" to avoid the attention from his friends). He continued recording various pop covers and originals over the following years, and the number of people subscribed to him on his YouTube channel increased rapidly.

=== 2012: It's Got Four Sad Songs on It BTW and record deal ===
After three years of uploading videos to his YouTube channel, he decided to release his first EP. Watson recorded his first EP It's Got Four Sad Songs on It BTW 'in 2012 with a college tutor. This record includes the four tracks "What About Today?", "Nothing", "Bones", "Windows". "I set the songs on that EP out like a story, he explains. "'What About Today' was about quite a rubbish situation where I was being used, and that was the tale of the end of a relationship; 'Windows' was looking back after the relationship ended; 'Bones' is about meeting someone new; and 'Nothing' is about being happy with that person." Within days of the EP's release, Watson had attracted the attention of various record labels and soon signed a deal with Warner Bros. Records. Part of the appeal, he says, was the label's long-running success with male solo artists as diverse as David Gray, Damien Rice, and Neil Young. Later that year Watson's second EP Another Four Sad Songs was released. It included a cover of "Lamplight", a song originally by Bombay Bicycle Club.

=== 2013: The Wild, Four More Songs, and Some Songs With Some Friends ===
In early 2013, Watson toured Australia supporting Birdy, and he also played a few surprise gigs in various locations. In addition, he performed at various festivals and tours, including supporting Benjamin Francis Leftwich on his May tour. In July 2013, Watson released his fourth EP Four More Songs, featuring a cover of Guillemots "Made up lovesong No. 43" and a demo version of a new song, "Close". In November 2013, he released his fifth EP Some Songs With Some Friends, which included three covers, featuring a different artist for each track, namely Gabrielle Aplin, Hudson Taylor, and Jaya Beach-Robertson. The EP also included a reworked version of "Even If" as the lead single.

=== 2014: The Morning ===
In February 2014, Watson announced his upcoming debut album The Morning, due for release in June. His extensive writing sessions yielded the majority of the material that features on the album. Some were written at the last possible moment, while others have been released before in sketch form, the oldest being "windows", which originally featured on his debut EP. "I'm not a fan of just repackaging old material. The original EPs were meant to be works in progress. And these versions are much more polished".

=== 2015–2018: midnight and Singles / EPs ===
Watson stepped away from the limelight to refocus and work on new material. Regaining full control, he was able to take his time writing songs that fully explored his experience and talent and, with a wealth of new material to choose from, he entered the studio and recorded his entire second album in just two weeks with a live band.

With a choice of labels keen for his signature after two years away, Lewis decided to find a new approach to releasing his music, partnering with the leading independent label Cooking Vinyl, and heading out on tour to showcase many of the new songs direct to his fans.

His album midnight was released on 24 March 2017 and the acoustic / alternative version of the album was released on 15 September 2017. He also released a live EP called "live at hoxton hall" on 23 March 2018 which is a live EP wherein he performs select songs from midnight.

On 28 May 2018, he released an EP called "nineties, noughties, tennies" in which he covered 3 songs from the three decades of his life.

A few months later, he released "summer jamz '18" which is a mixtape of his favorite songs and some of his demos. This was in tribute to a similar thing he did last 2013 (summer jamz '13).

He also released a Christmas song titled "christmas eve alone this year" on 4 December 2018 in which he talks about his time while touring America wherein he felt so alone that he even considered giving everything up just to get back home.

=== 2019-2020: Collaborations and the love that you want ===
Lewis appeared as a featured artist on dodie's 2019 EP Human, on the track "Not What I Meant."

On 31 May 2019, he released the song "meant for me" as the first song from his upcoming unannounced album. He then released the music video on 25 June 2019 as well as the acoustic version of the song on 28 June 2019.

He released the song "fly when i fall" on 23 August 2019 as the second song from his upcoming unannounced album. He then released the acoustic version of it on 4 October 2019

Lewis was featured on Consoul Trainin's song "Don't Say A Word" which was released on 27 September 2019.

On 27 November 2019, Lewis announced that his third album the love that you want would be released on 29 May 2020. Short after his announcement, he released the song "spark" on 29 November 2019 as the third song from his upcoming album (along with a music video.)

He released the acoustic version of spark on 10 January 2020 and about a month later, on 14 February 2020, he released the song "because of you" which is the fourth song from his upcoming album. He also released the acoustic version of "because of you" on 13 March 2020. The music video was then released on 27 March 2020.

On 17 April 2020, he released the fifth song from his upcoming album, "castles of sand" (along with a music video) and the acoustic version was released on 15 May 2020.

His third album the love that you want became available to the world on 29 May 2020 and the acoustic / alternative version of the album was released on 6 November 2020.

=== 2020-present: Twitch and others ===
Due to the coronavirus pandemic, Lewis was unable to tour his brand new album. As an alternative, he started regularly streaming music (and other content as well) on Twitch (@levvvvis).

On 11 February 2021, he released a cover of "drivers license" which was originally sung by Olivia Rodrigo.

Lewis also released on 19 April 2021 a re-imagined version of "what about today?", one of his songs from his first ever ep. The re-imagined version showcases his growth as a vocalist and as an artist over the years.

During his twitch streams, he is very vocal about his insomnia and his struggle to sleep. So on 18 June 2021, Lewis released a piano instrumental ep called "my songs but on a piano". He also designed a website to go along with the six-track ep in hopes of helping others sleep and/or relax with piano music and ambient sounds.

On 1 September 2021, he announced the project September Studios where he will be re-recording his debut album The Morning every weekday in September on Twitch, calling it The Morning After.

== Discography ==
=== Studio albums ===
Title	Details	Peak chart positions	
Title	Details	UK	AUS
The Morning	Released: 7 July 2014; Label: Warner Music; Format: Digital download, CD	28	—
Midnight	Released: 24 March 2017; Label: Cooking Vinyl; Format: Digital download, CD	91	81
the love that you want	Released: 29 May 2020; Label: Cooking Vinyl; Format: Digital download, CD, LP, Streaming	—	—
blue skies grey	Released: 7 February 2025; Label: Nettwerk Music Group; Format: Digital download, vinyl (tbd)	-	-

=== Extended plays ===
Title	Details
It's Got Four Sad Songs on It BTW	Released: 25 May 2012; Label: Warner Music; Format: Digital download, CD
Another Four Sad Songs	Released: 12 October 2012; Label: Warner Music; Format: Digital download, CD
The Wild	Released: 22 March 2013; Label: Warner Music; Format: Digital download, CD
Four More Songs	Released: 11 June 2013; Label: Warner Music; Format: Digital download, CD
Some Songs with Some Friends	Released: 26 November 2013; Label: Warner Music; Format: Digital download, CD

=== Singles ===
Year	Title	Peak chart positions	Album
Year	Title	UK	Album
2013	"Calling"	69	Four More Songs
2013	"Even If"	176	Some Songs with Some Friends
2013	"Into the Wild"	86	The Morning
2016	"Maybe We're Home"	—	Midnight
2016	"Hello Hello"	—	Midnight
2016	"Little Light"	—	Midnight
2020	"Spark"	—	The Love That You Want
2020	"Castles of Sand"	—	The Love That You Want
