= Thomas Sanders (entertainer) =

American internet personality (born 1989)

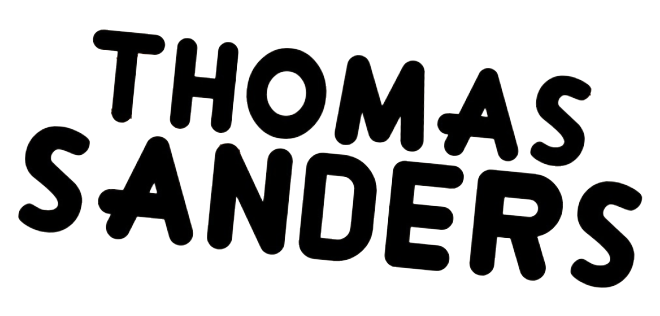
- Thomas Sanders' logo used from February 2016 onward.
- Born: Thomas Foley Sanders; April 24, 1989 (age 37); Gainesville, Florida, U.S.
- Education: University of Florida (BS)
- Occupations: Musical theater actor; singer; Vine and YouTube personality; engineer
- Known for: Narrating People's Lives (Vine); Sanders Sides; Cartoon Therapy
- Awards: Shorty Award; Streamy Award

YouTube information
- Channel: Thomas Sanders
- Years active: 2009–present
- Genres: Comedy; music
- Subscribers: 4.88 million
- Views: 930.5 million
- Last updated: September 13, 2026
- Website: www.thomassanders.com

Thomas Sanders (born April 24, 1989) is an American singer, actor, voice actor, scriptwriter and internet personality made famous by Vine and YouTube. He is best known for his YouTube channel and Vine career, which lasted from April 2013 until the social media site was shut down by Twitter in 2017. After the shutdown of Vine, he continued releasing videos across various social media sites. Sanders creates long videos on YouTube, while simultaneously posting shorter videos in the style of Vine to Instagram, Tumblr, TikTok and Twitter. His work consists of comedy sketches, pranks, stories, singing and civil rights activism.

Sanders is mainly known for the Vine series Narrating People's Lives, also known as Storytime, for the prank series "Disney Pranks with Friends," and on YouTube for the series Sanders Sides. He reached over 7.4 billion loops and 8.3 million followers on Vine, making his career one of the most successful in this social media platform's short history. As of April 2023, his account on TikTok has a following of 10 million followers. On YouTube, he has two channels, "Thomas Sanders" and "Thomas Sanders and Friends", with the latter being discontinued in November 2021. As of August 2023, his main channel has over 4.1 million subscribers and his second channel has 379,000 subscribers. Sanders has won two Shorty Awards and one Streamy Award, for best Viner and best YouTube comedian, and has been nominated for a Teen Choice Award to "Choice Viner" among other recognitions.

As a singer, Sanders has published one EP in 2013, one album in 2016, and several singles from 2017 onwards. He has had a career in musical theatre in his hometown in Florida since he was a teenager, performing since 2006 in Gainesville and Orlando, Florida, and starring in a tour through 17 cities in the US and Canada with his own stage musical, Ultimate Storytime, based on his Vine series. In 2017, he made a guest appearance on the Disney Channel show Bizaardvark and co-hosted a special episode of the Disney XD show Walk the Prank alongside David Lopez. He has worked as a voice actor in the movie Phineas and Ferb the Movie: Candace Against the Universe, and in the TV cartoon shows Hamster & Gretel and Kabu.

== Early and personal life ==
Sanders was born and raised in Gainesville, Florida. Sanders's father is a teacher, his mother a dancer. He has three brothers. His great-grandfather on his mother's side was born in Ireland. His great-grandmother was a Ziegfeld Follies girl, something Sanders called his "ancestral connection to the stage". Sanders started singing and acting at Kanapaha Middle School in Gainesville, where he was part of the school's choir and theater club. At Buchholz High School, he started doing musical plays. Later, Sanders combined his studies at the University of Florida with community theater, joining the Gainesville Community Playhouse from 2006 until 2015. After graduating with a bachelor's degree in chemical engineering in 2011, he combined his daytime job as a manufacturing engineer at a pharmaceutical development company in Alachua with his night-time job in theater. When he became successful on Vine, he left his job as an engineer to pursue Vine and theater full-time. In June 2017, he publicly came out as gay.

== Career ==
=== Vine and Sanders Shorts ===
Thomas Sanders made his debut on Vine on April 14, 2013, as "Foster Dawg", named after his first dog, Foster. (Note: Sanders continues to release music under the company Foster Dawg, Inc.) An impression of Stewie Griffin from Family Guy in a drive-thru was his first Vine to go viral, leading to continued success on the app. He later rebranded his channel to "Thomas Sanders". His channel reached 1 million followers on Vine in October 2013. His biggest success on Vine was the Narrating People's Lives series, also known as Storytime, where he approached random strangers, comically narrated everyday activities they were doing, and showed their reaction. Other Vine series he is known for are Disney Pranks with Friends, Pokémon Pranks, Misleading Compliments, and Shoutout Sunday, among others. By April 2015, Sanders' Vine account had over 5 million followers, which made Thomas Sanders the 17th most followed Viner at the time.

When Twitter announced that it was closing Vine down at the end of 2016, Sanders announced that he would continue making Vines until the app's last day. When Vine was shut down on January 17, 2017, Sanders had reached 8.3 million followers. Since that date, his short videos, now known as the Sanders Shorts, are first released on his Instagram, where as of November 2018 he has 2.5 million followers.

On February 24, 2015, Sanders appeared as a guest on The View in a segment featuring Vine stars, where he was interviewed about his popularity on Vine, and one of his Vines was featured on The Ellen DeGeneres Show in their section Vine after Vine. Sanders has collaborated with Viners such as Vincent Marcus, Brandon Calvillo and Amymarie Gaertner, and featured cameos and appearances from figures such as Sean Bean, Nicolle Wallace, Stacy London, Nick Pitera (with whom he did a series of Vines, Unexpected Duets), Brizzy Voices, Gabbie Hanna, Tara Strong, E. G. Daily, Jim Cummings, Dan and Phil, Adam Pascal and the main actors from Hamilton, Teen Titans Go! and Steven Universe, among others.

=== YouTube ===
Sanders opened his official YouTube account on March 15, 2009. After amassing a following through Vine, he started publishing more frequently through YouTube. He had his first YouTube collaborations throughout 2015, consisting of pranks, games and challenges. Up until 2014, his subscriber count grew at a lower rate, with around 80,000 subscribers at the end of that year. From that date, his user count growth started progressively accelerating, having 200,000 subscribers by April 2015 and more than 700,000 subscribers at the end of 2015.

From the second half of 2016, at the same time his Vine activity slowed following Twitter's announcement of Vine's forthcoming closedown, Sanders announced he would be focusing on his YouTube content from then on to create more diversely formatted content. As of May 2026, his channel has 4.82 million subscribers.

On October 29, 2018, he debuted a second YouTube channel called "Thomas Sanders & Friends", which would be dedicated to the monthly Sanders Shorts compilations and the unscripted, guest-oriented shows he had done previously on his main channel. The main channel would thereafter be dedicated exclusively to scripted series and shows as well as his music videoclips. His second channel had 396,000 subscribers as of August 2021. In November 2021, Sanders published the last content in this second channel, which has since been quietly discontinued, with its kind of content being brought back to the first channel ever since.

==== Sanders Sides ====
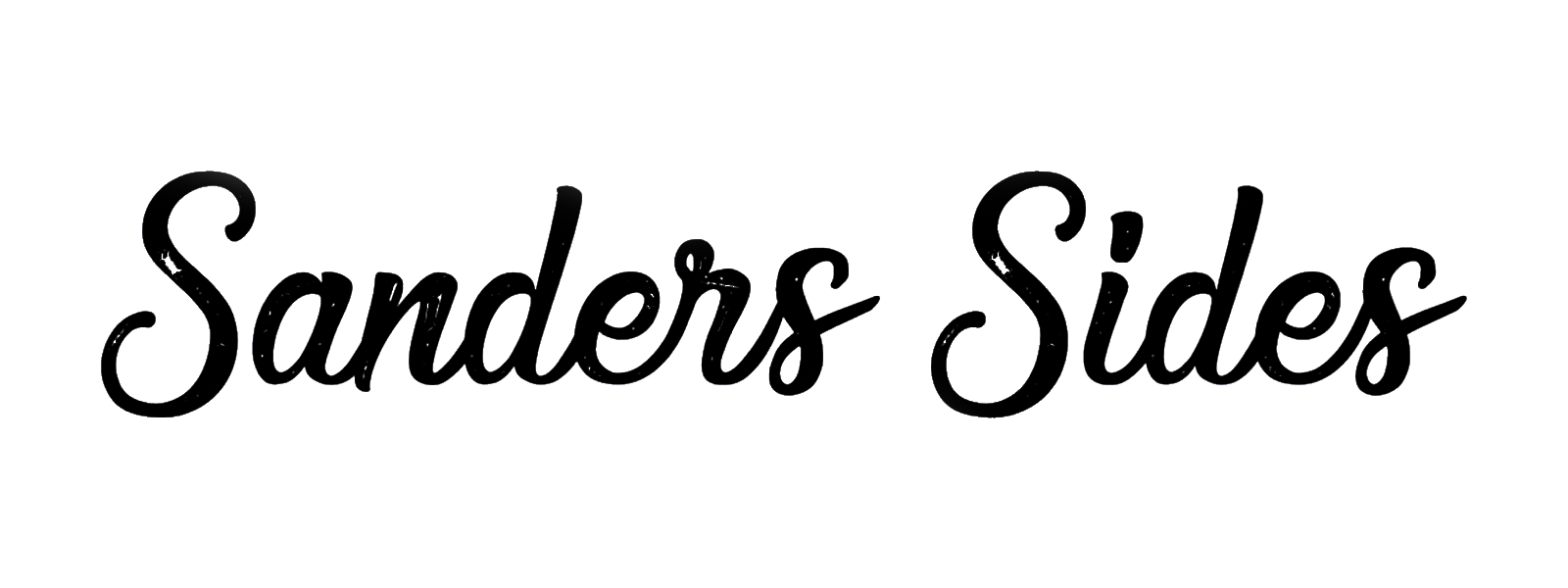
Sanders Sides Series logo since September 1, 2017.

Since October 19, 2016, Thomas Sanders has run a YouTube web series called Sanders Sides, formerly co-written with Joan S., in which he discusses personal or existential issues with four main characters, collectively known as the titular "Sanders Sides". Sanders Sides consists of two seasons with a total of 33 episodes as of January 2024, released on a variable periodicity. Season 1 has 17 episodes released from October 19, 2016, to July 19, 2017. Season 2 began on September 1, 2017, and as of January 2024, it has 15 episodes. It is a spin-off from the Vine/Sanders Shorts series, as the characters Patton, Roman and Logan are inspired by characters that had previously debuted on Vine in 2014, as the "Dad Guy", the "Prince Guy", and the "Teacher Guy," respectively. The Sanders Sides are usually all portrayed by Sanders himself. Sanders Sides has featured guest stars such as Lilly Singh, Leslie Odom Jr., or Butch Hartman who, apart from appearing as himself, created an animated sequence exclusively for Sanders Sides. Tara Strong, who had already appeared in several Vines and Sanders Shorts, also made a voice cameo in Hartman's episode. On November 22, 2019, a companion series titled Sanders Asides was premiered, featuring the Sides in lighter stories in shorter episodes designed, in Sanders' words, to feature stories not directly linked to the main narrative.

The Sanders Sides are "physical-mental projections" of Thomas' mind, and represent different aspects of Thomas' (Note: The Thomas that appears as a character on Sanders Sides is a fictional character based on the real Thomas Sanders, who talks about him in third person.) personality. Thomas usually starts each episode as an ordinary vlog about a certain topic or dilemma. The series is mostly comedic, with some more dramatic elements and several ongoing plots.

=== Theater ===
Apart from his Internet-based career, Sanders has worked in musical theater at the Gainesville Community Playhouse for productions including Hot Mikado (2007), Singin' in the Rain (2009), The Producers (2010), Anything Goes (2011), Into the Woods (2014), and Les Misérables (2014). In 2015, Sanders did his first professional theater work starring in Heathers: The Musical as J.D. in a production performed in Orlando. From August 8 to September 2, 2016, Sanders went on a stage musical tour, Ultimate Storytime, written by him with songs composed by Jacob Fjeldheim, and based on his Vine series Narrating People's Lives, performing in 17 cities in the US and Canada, including Toronto and New York City. In 2019, Sanders was cast as the understudy for The Beast in Beauty and the Beast In 2022, he joined Heathers The Musical in Concert, a benefit concert reunion of the 2015 Orlando cast of Heathers: The Musical, portraying again J.D., which earned him a nomination to Best Performer in a Musical in the 2022 BroadwayWorld Orlando Awards, as well as another nomination together with the rest of the cast to Best Ensemble Performance.From 2023 onwards, he returned to the Gainesville theater scene, in 2023 in "Sweeney Todd" portraying the titular character, the Emcee in "Cabaret" in 2024, and Frank 'N Furter in the "Rocky Horror Show" in 2025.

=== Music ===
Though critics often classified Sanders as a baritone, he considers himself a bass singer. He has sung primarily on Vine and YouTube. He has performed songs in a wide variety of genres but has personally showed a preference towards jazz music, mentioning Nat King Cole as one of his favorite singers. He has musically collaborated with dodie, Jon Cozart, Ben J. Pierce, Deedee Magno Hall, Adam Pascal, and AJ Rafael. He released his first EP, titled Merry Christmas, on Bandcamp on December 21, 2013; the EP consisted of Christmas songs. In 2016, he released the soundtrack of his Ultimate Storytime stage musical, recorded alongside his co-stars, Terrence Williams Jr., Nicole Visco, Jay Harper (also known as JayIsJo) and Leo Anderson (also known as Leo the Giant). On July 22, 2017, Sanders released on YouTube a new original song titled "The Things We Used to Share", inspired by real events in Sanders' life. It was followed by more singles in 2018 and the announcement of a new EP.

==== EPs and albums ====
- Merry Christmas (EP) (2013)
- Ultimate Storytime (2016)

==== Songs and singles ====
Year	Title	Duet with	Data
2013	"Snow in Venice"	Jacob Fjeldheim (piano)	Cover of a song by Elizaveta.
2014	"A Dream is a Wish Your Heart Makes"	Jacob Fjeldheim (piano)	Jazz cover of a song from Cinderella.
2015	"Proud of Your Boy"		Cover from the musical Aladdin published in Sanders' Tumblr account.
2016	"Vine vs YouTube"	Jon Cozart	Song based on "Anything You Can Do" from the musical Annie Get Your Gun.
2016	"Middle of a Moment"		Cover from the musical James and the Giant Peach.
2016	"Freeze Your Brain"		Cover from Heathers: The Musical starring Sanders in 2015.
2016	"What You Own"	Adam Pascal	Cover from the musical Rent.
2016	"The Internet is Down"	AVbyte	Original song by AVbyte.
2016	"RIP Vine: A Song"	Jon Cozart	Song nominated to a Streamy Award, based on "Agony" from Into the Woods.
2017	"Lies"		Original song written by Thomas Sanders and Chris Shaw and performed on Sanders Sides.
2017	"Birds"	dodie	Cover from Sanders' Ultimate Storytime musical.
2017	"Dear Happy"	dodie	Original song by dodie.
2017	"Warrior Girl"	Deedee Magno Hall	Cover from Sanders' Ultimate Storytime musical.
2017	"A Lovely Night"	Miss Benny	Cover from La La Land.
2017	"Waving Through a Window"	dodie & Miss Benny	Cover from the musical Dear Evan Hansen.
2017	"Aggressive Bouts of Beat Poetry"		Rap song written by Joan S. and performed on Sanders Sides.
2017	"New York, New York"	dodie	Cover from the musical of the same name.
2017	"The Things We Used to Share"		Original song written by Joan S., first original single.
2017	"Tomorrow Never Came"	Miss Benny	Cover of a song by Lana Del Rey.
2017	"12 Days of Christmas"		Christmas song performed on Sanders Sides.
2018	"Rear View"	Foti	Original song by Foti.
2018	"Disappear"	AJ Rafael	Cover from the musical Dear Evan Hansen.
2018	"I Won't Say I'm in Love (mash-up)"	Terrence Williams Jr., Jamahl Rawls & Foti	Single, cover of a song from Hercules mashed up with several Disney songs.
2018	"Crofter's: The Musical"		Single, performed on Sanders Sides.
2018	"On the Borderline"		Single, original song written by Joan S.
2018	"breathin"	Foti	Single, cover of a song by Ariana Grande.
2018	"Incomplete (The Puzzle Song)"		Single, original song performed on Sanders Sides.
2019	"Seasons of Love"	A chorus with several of his friends	Single, cover of a song from the musical Rent.
2019	"Friends on the Other Side – Disney Villain Mash-Up"	Brittney Kelly, Valerie Torres-Rosario, Foti, Jamahl Rawls, Terrence Williams Jr., & Leo Anderson	Single, cover of a song from The Princess and the Frog mashed up with several Disney songs.
2019	"Forbidden Fruit (The Duke's Theme)"		Single, original song performed on Sanders Sides.
2019	"A Gay Disney Prince"	Jon Cozart	Single, original song mashed up with several Disney songs.
2019	"Recipe for Me"		Single, original song written by Joan S. and Jamahl Rawls.
2020	"Rhythm Redux"		Single, original song performed on Sanders Sides.
2021	"Seventeen"	Nicole Visco	Reunion cover from Heathers: The Musical which Sanders and Visco starred in 2015.
2021	"Hallellujah"	Caleb Hyles, Jonathan Young, Dan Vasc & Colm McGuinness	Single produced by Caleb Hyles, cover of a song written by Leonard Cohen.
2021	"Landslide"	Thomas Sanders' father (guitar)	Single, cover of a song by Fleetwood Mac.
2022	"Trying Too Hard"		Single, Cover from a song from Central Park.
2022	"Stranger Things Mash-Up"		Single, mash-up of the songs "Running Up That Hill", "The Neverending Story" and "Time After Time".
2022	"Into the Unknown"		Single, cover of a song from Over the Garden Wall performed for a Sanders Sides short.
2023	"Disney Friendship Mash-Up"	Joseph Fote, Jay Harper, Terrence Williams, Valerie Torres-Rosario, Quil Darling	Single, mash-up of several Disney songs.
2024	"Yours"	Terrence Williams Jr.	Single, first song fully composed and written by Thomas Sanders.
2025	"The Elements (updated)"		Single, cover of a song from Dr. H Musics, an updated version of the song originally composed by Tom Lehrer.
2025	"Talk Shit"	PEGGY	Single, original song cowritten by Thomas Sanders and PEGGY among others.
2025	"Sally's Song"	Leo Anderson	Single, cover of a song from "Nightmare Before Christmas".
2026	"Passing Through (Can't The Future Just Wait)"		Single, cover of a song by Kaden MacKay

== Filmography ==
Year	Title	Role	Notes
2016	Sanders Sides & Sanders Asides	Various characters	Webseries 33 episodes Nominated for Streamy Award for Best Writing
2017	Bizaardvark	Ian Finkelman	1 episode
2017	Walk the Prank	Himself	1 episode
2020	Phineas and Ferb the Movie: Candace Against the Universe	Throat-Lobster	Voice
2022	Hamster & Gretel	Neighslayer, Additional Voices	Voice, episode "Neigh, It Ain't So!"
2025-2026	Kabu	Bearemy	Voice, 11 episodes

== Awards and nominations ==
Year	Award	Nominee	Result
2014	Ryan Seacrest's Favorite Vine Celebrity Contest	Thomas Sanders	Won
2015	Univision's Shorty Awards – Vine Star of the Year	Thomas Sanders	Won
2016	Streamy Awards – Viner of the Year	Thomas Sanders	Won
2016	Teen Choice Awards – Choice Viner	Thomas Sanders	Nominated
2017	Shorty Awards – YouTube Comedian	Thomas Sanders	Won
2017	Streamy Awards – Collaboration	Thomas Sanders and Jon Cozart for "RIP Vine: A Song"	Nominated
2017	Unicorn Awards – YouTuber of the Year	Thomas Sanders	Nominated
2019	Streamy Awards – Best Writing	Thomas Sanders, Joan S., Adri White, Quil Cauchon and AJ Hentges for "Sanders Sides"	Nominated
2022	BroadwayWorld Orlando Awards - Best Performer in a Musical	Thomas Sanders for "Heathers The Musical in Concert"	Nominated
2022	BroadwayWorld Orlando Awards - Best Ensemble Performance	The whole cast of "Heathers The Musical in Concert"	Nominated
