= Fizz (band) =

Alt Prog Rock supergroup

- Origin: London, England
- Genres: Alternative rock; progressive rock; indie; pop
- Years active: 2023–2024 (on hiatus)
- Labels: Decca; Universal Music Group
- Members: Greta Isaac; Martin Luke Brown; Dodie; Orla Gartland
- Website: yourfavebandfizz.com

Fizz (stylised in all caps as FIZZ) is an indie pop supergroup from London composed of musicians Orla Gartland, Dodie, Greta Isaac and Martin Luke Brown. Their debut studio album, The Secret to Life, was released on 27 October 2023.

== History ==
Fizz came together in "a whirlwind of pure joy and escapism, inverting everything each artist knew about making music to produce an album with fun and a love of the craft at its core."

The members are friends and fans of each other's work, having previously collaborated on individual projects. Their debut studio album The Secret to Life was recorded over a two-week period at Middle Farm Studios in South Devon with Peter Miles.

The Secret to Life was released on 27 October and peaked at position 31 on the UK Albums Chart.

On 3 July 2024, the band announced their official hiatus to focus on their solo careers and projects. The official Fizz band account on Instagram wrote '"No one knows what lies ahead, maybe someday we’ll find our way back to Fizzville. In the meantime - keep the lights on for us."

== Musical style ==
The band's unique musical style has been described as psychedelic, maximalist, and theatrical, often drawing inspiration from influential artists of previous eras. Their debut studio album, The Secret to Life, offers a diverse range of genres to “create a giddy, freewheeling pop sound”. The track "Grand Finale" has been compared to Queen's "Bohemian Rhapsody," while the track "You, Me, Lonely," has been compared to Crosby, Stills, Nash & Young.

In the production of The Secret to Life, the band bypassed many production tools commonly used in contemporary pop music and relied on real instruments and recording live takes of songs directly onto tape. This approach, as discussed in interviews, imparts a nostalgic quality reminiscent of the music of the 1960s and 1970s.

== Band members ==
- Dodie – vocals, guitar, keyboards, tambourine, clarinet (2023–present)
- Greta Isaac – vocals, guitar, percussion (2023–present)
- Orla Gartland – vocals, guitar, bass, percussion (2023–present)
- Martin Luke Brown – vocals, guitar, keyboards, percussion (2023–present)

== Discography ==
=== Studio albums ===
List of studio albums, with selected chart positions
Title	Details	Peak chart positions
Title	Details	UK
The Secret to Life	Release: 27 October 2023; Label: Decca, Universal Music Group; Formats: CD, LP, digital download, streaming	31

=== Singles ===
List of singles, with year released, and parent album shown
Title	Year	Album
"High in Brighton"	2023	The Secret to Life
"Hell of a Ride"	2023	The Secret to Life
"Close One"	2023	The Secret to Life
"As Good as It Gets"	2023	The Secret to Life
"You, Me, Lonely"	2023	The Secret to Life

== Critical reception ==
Critical reception of The Secret to Life was generally positive.

The album was praised for its distinctive sound, vocals, and emotive lyrics, but was also described as occasionally cliché.
