= Intertwined =

EP by Dodie
- Released: 10 November 2016
- Length: 14:56
- Label: Doddleoddle

Dodie chronology
| Intertwined (2016) | You (2017) |

Singles from Intertwined
- 1. "Sick of Losing Soulmates" Released: 14 October 2016

Intertwined is the debut extended play by English singer-songwriter Dodie. The EP was self-released by Dodie through her label Doddleoddle on 10 November 2016.

== Background ==
Since 2011, Dodie has been releasing original songs to her YouTube account. Album tracks "Absolutely Smitten" and "Sick of Losing Soulmates" were released in 2013 and 2015 respectively, and "Intertwined" and "When" premiered in 2016. The latter song would be re-recorded as a studio version for her 2021 debut studio album Build a Problem. The EP was announced via a YouTube video on 14 October 2016.

== Promotion ==
"Sick of Losing Soulmates" was released as the EP's first single on 14 October 2016. A music video was released for the song on 9 December 2016. A stop-motion animated music video for the title track was released on 7 April 2017.

Dodie embarked on a UK tour for the EP in March 2017.

== Track listing ==
| No. | Title | Length |
|---|---|---|
| 1. | "Intertwined" | 3:11 |
| 2. | "I Have a Hole in My Tooth (And My Dentist Is Shut)" | 0:40 |
| 3. | "Absolutely Smitten" | 3:01 |
| 4. | "Life Lesson" | 0:22 |
| 5. | "Sick of Losing Soulmates" | 4:27 |
| 6. | "When" (Live) | 3:15 |
| Total length: | | 14:56 |

== Charts ==
| Chart (2016) | Peak position |
|---|---|
| Irish Albums (IRMA) | 33 |
| UK Albums (OCC) | 35 |
| US Billboard 200 | 153 |
| US Top Alternative Albums (Billboard) | 13 |
| US Folk Albums (Billboard) | 5 |
| US Heatseekers Albums (Billboard) | 1 |
| US Independent Albums (Billboard) | 10 |
| US Top Rock Albums (Billboard) | 23 |
