= Jon Cozart =

American YouTuber, musician and comedian

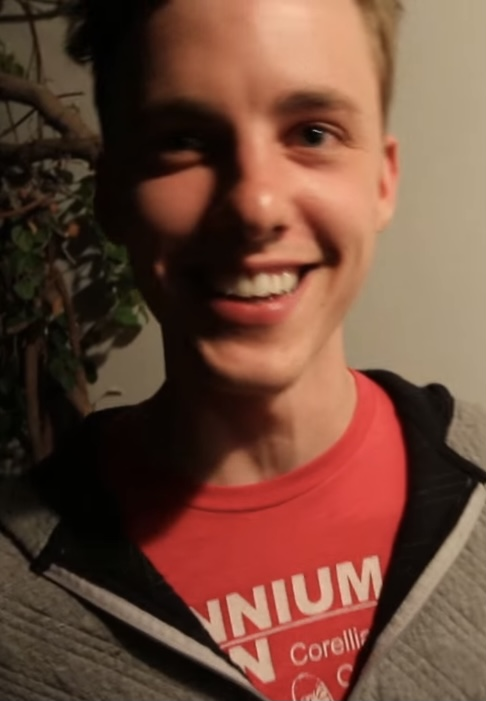
- In a 2016 Vlogbrothers video
- Born: Jonathan Charles Cozart; Little Rock, Arkansas, U.S.
- Education: University of Texas at Austin

Comedy career
- Years active: 2010–present
- Genres: Comedy music; parody music; satire

YouTube information
- Channel: Paint
- Subscribers: 4.50 million
- Views: 574.3 million
- Last updated: November 5, 2025

Jonathan Charles Cozart, also known by his online alias Paint, is an American YouTube personality, musician, and comedian. As of November 2025, his main YouTube channel has 4.5 million subscribers.

== Personal life ==
Cozart was born in Little Rock, Arkansas, and raised in Houston, Texas, from the age of six. After graduating from Cypress Creek High School in 2011, he moved to Austin, Texas and studied film at University of Texas. Cozart took piano lessons as a child.

Cozart is bisexual, and came out publicly in June 2017.

In late January 2022, he announced on Instagram that he has been in a relationship with Sarah Sharpe since early 2021.

== Career ==
=== YouTube career ===
His YouTube channel "Paint", an account gifted to him by his brother, was created on December 27, 2005, and has over 4.5 million subscribers as of November 2025. Cozart's career in video started in middle school as a way to avoid writing papers, offering to make videos instead, and he continued this through high school.

On July 17, 2011, Cozart uploaded "Harry Potter in 99 Seconds", which quickly became a viral video, with 65 million views as of November 2025.

Cozart grew his audience on YouTube with his Disney parody videos, which place Disney Princesses into modern circumstances through a cappella layering of his own voice to supply the music. "After Ever After" was uploaded in 2013, and has amassed 97 million views as of November 2025. "After Ever After 2" was released in 2014 and "After Ever After 3" was released in 2018. He then went on hiatus after November of that year, but returned in October 2020 with the video "If Trump Was In Hamilton."

=== Live shows ===
In 2015, Cozart performed his own one-man show, "Laughter Ever After", at the Edinburgh Fringe Festival. His live performance of musical comedy was well-reviewed by attendees, stating, "Jon Cozart delights with his witty, heartfelt music."

Cozart joined fellow YouTube musicians Dodie Clark, Tessa Violet, and Rusty Clanton in 2016 for selected shows of the small and intimate Transatlantic Tour along the east coast.

=== Other work ===
Cozart hosted the 7th Streamy Awards on September 26, 2017. His hosting turn was described as "vicious" by Newsweek, and the show included a musical number in which Cozart compared nominee Jake Paul to then-U.S. President Donald Trump. Cozart described his approach as satirizing the perceived "hypocrisy of the new media industry."

Cozart played the role of Donny Meadows in the 2020 web series Wayward Guide for the Untrained Eye, and the role of the bard Diedrich Knickerbocker in Shipwrecked Comedy's 2022 web series Headless: A Sleepy Hollow Story.

== Awards and nominations ==
Year	Award	Nominee	Result
2016	Streamy Awards – Collaboration	Jon Cozart and Various Creators for "YouTube Culture: A Song"	Nominated
2017	Streamy Awards – Collaboration	Jon Cozart and Thomas Sanders for "RIP Vine: A Song"	Nominated
