= Evan Edinger =

American-British YouTuber based in London

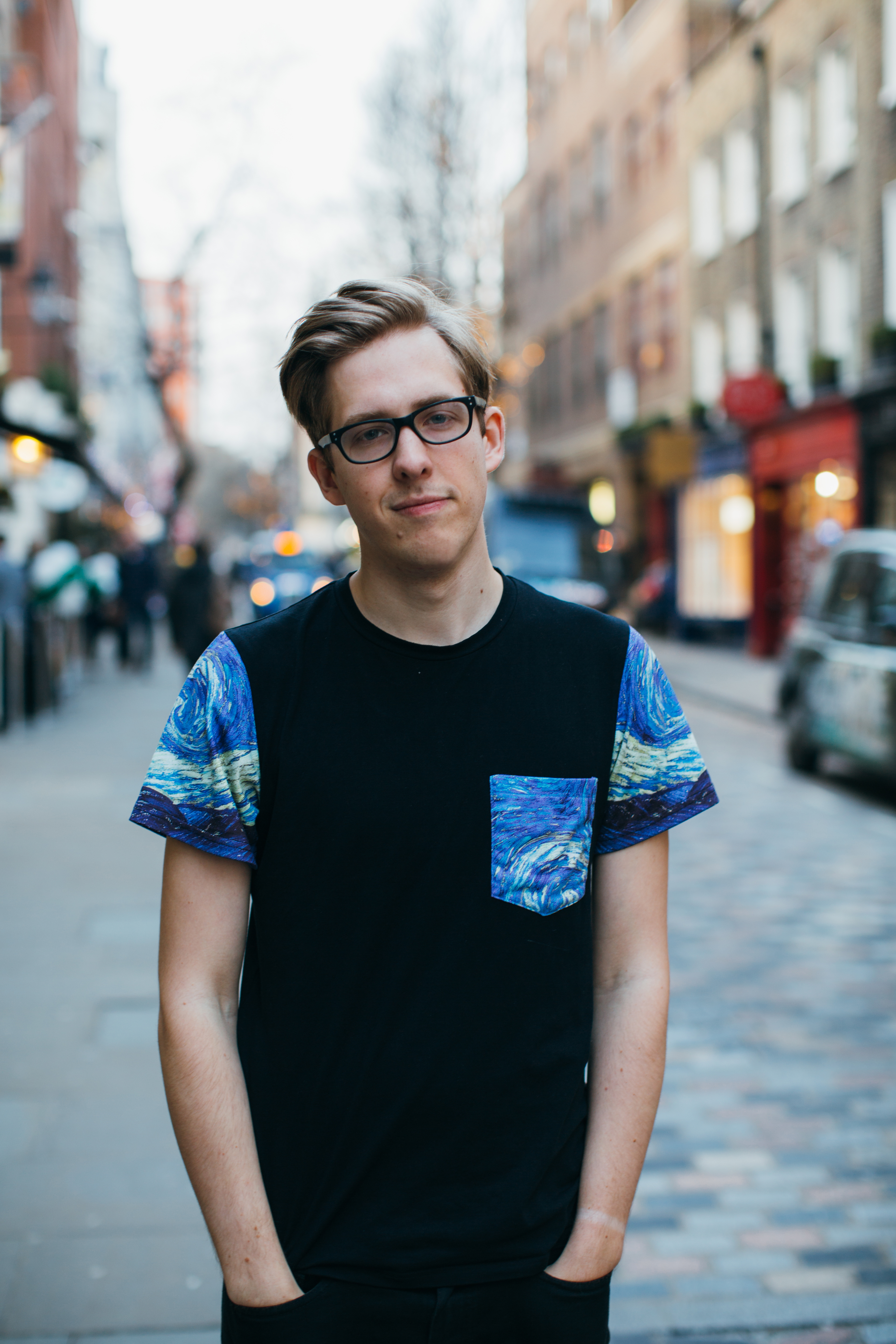
- Edinger in 2016
- Born: July 29, 1990 (age 36)

YouTube information
- Channels: Evan Edinger; Evan Edinger Travel
- Years active: 2006–present
- Genres: Travel; Vlog; Comedy
- Subscribers: 1.2 million 143 thousand
- Views: 211.51 million 18.66 million
- Last updated: May 28, 2026

Evan Edinger (/ˈɛdɪŋə/ ED-ing-ər; born July 29, 1990) is an American-British YouTuber currently based in London. As of May 2026, Edinger's self-titled YouTube channel has gained over 1.2 million subscribers and over 211.51 million views, and his secondary YouTube channel, Evan Edinger Travel, has gained over 143 thousand subscribers and over 18.66 million views.

Edinger is known for his "British VS American" series in which he compares topics such as exams, healthcare systems, and taxes with guest YouTubers from the United Kingdom.

== Early life and education ==
Edinger was born on July 29, 1990, and grew up in Deptford Township, New Jersey. He attended Woodstown High School in Salem County, New Jersey, from 2006 to 2008. He then received an Associate of Arts degree in mathematics at Salem Community College in Carneys Point Township, New Jersey, where he graduated in 2010.

Edinger received a Bachelor of Arts in mathematics, statistics, and operation research from Rowan University in Glassboro, New Jersey. He began posting YouTube videos in 2010 while still in college. Edinger was largely inspired by the work of Charlotte McDonnell and Ray William Johnson. He originally used the pseudonym "naveregnide", his name spelled backwards, before changing it to his full name.

In 2012, Edinger moved to London to pursue a Master of Science in Actuarial Science at Bayes Business School (then known as Cass Business School) of City St George's, University of London. After finishing his degree, Edinger remained there to work full-time.

== Career ==
Over his time as a YouTuber, Edinger has collaborated with Dodie Clark, Tom Scott, Jay Foreman, and others. For a time, Edinger and Clark shared an apartment. He has amassed over 1.1 million subscribers on his main channel and 140,000 on his travel channel and has posted over 1200 videos across both channels.

== Personal life ==
Edinger identifies as being on the asexual spectrum and near demisexual. On June 13, 2021, Edinger announced he had received British citizenship.

Edinger has been in a relationship with lawyer Heather Stewart since 2021.
