= You (EP) =

EP by Dodie
- Released: 11 August 2017
- Length: 16:03
- Label: Doddleoddle

Dodie chronology
Intertwined (2016)	You (2017)	Human (2019)

Singles from You
- 1. "6/10" Released: 7 July 2017

You is the second extended play by English singer-songwriter Dodie. The EP was self-released by Dodie through her record label Doddleoddle on 11 August 2017.

== Background ==
All of the EP's tracks had previously appeared as demos on Dodie's YouTube channel. "Would You Be So Kind", "6/10", "Secret For the Mad" were released in 2016, and "You", "Instrumental", and an acoustic version of "In the Middle" were released in 2017.

== Promotion ==
"6/10" was released as the EP's first single as part of the pre-order on 7 July 2017. A music video for the song was released on 29 September 2017. Official music videos were also released for "You", "In The Middle" and "Secret For The Mad" on 27 October 2017, 15 December 2017 and 26 January 2018 respectively. Dodie embarked on a North American tour to promote the EP in 2018.

== Track listing ==
No.	Title	Length
1.	"In the Middle"	3:01
2.	"6/10"	3:05
3.	"Instrumental"	0:50
4.	"You"	2:50
5.	"Secret for the Mad"	3:17
6.	"Would You Be So Kind"	3:00
Total length:		16:03

== Charts ==
Chart (2017)	Peak position
Australian Albums (ARIA)	17
Canadian Albums (Billboard)	34
Irish Albums (IRMA)	5
UK Albums (OCC)	6
US Billboard 200	55
US Independent Albums (Billboard)	2
US Folk Albums (Billboard)	3
