= Peter Miles (music producer) =

- Born: Peter Miles
- Genres: Pop; rock
- Occupation: Record producer
- Instruments: Bass guitar; electric guitar; synthesizer
- Years active: 2003–present

Peter Miles is a British record producer based in Devon, England.

== Career ==
Although Peter Miles has worked in a variety of genres (indie, folk, pop and hip-hop) he is most recognised as a rock producer. Bands Miles has worked with include Sweet Billy Pilgrim, Orla Gartland, Dodie, Architects, the Skints, We Are the Ocean, Futures, Fizz, Canterbury, Rachel Sermanni, Francesqa, the Cape Race and Tellison.

Miles began touring with and in bands for several years in his teens, notably playing with Martin Grech. During this time he discovered a talent for production and song arrangement. He began recording some of his favourite punk bands wherever possible (studios ranging from bedrooms to rehearsal rooms and the occasional pro studio).

He eventually settled in his own residential studio, Holne Bridge Studios, which is where the majority of his recordings have been made. He moved from Holne Bridge in 2010 and has relocated to another, larger residential studio in East Devon, working alongside producer and engineer James Bragg, who has helped engineer many of the records Miles has produced.

The NME called him "a genuinely super producer", and BBC Radio 1's Mike Davies called him a "legend".
