= Dodie =

English singer and songwriter (born 1995)

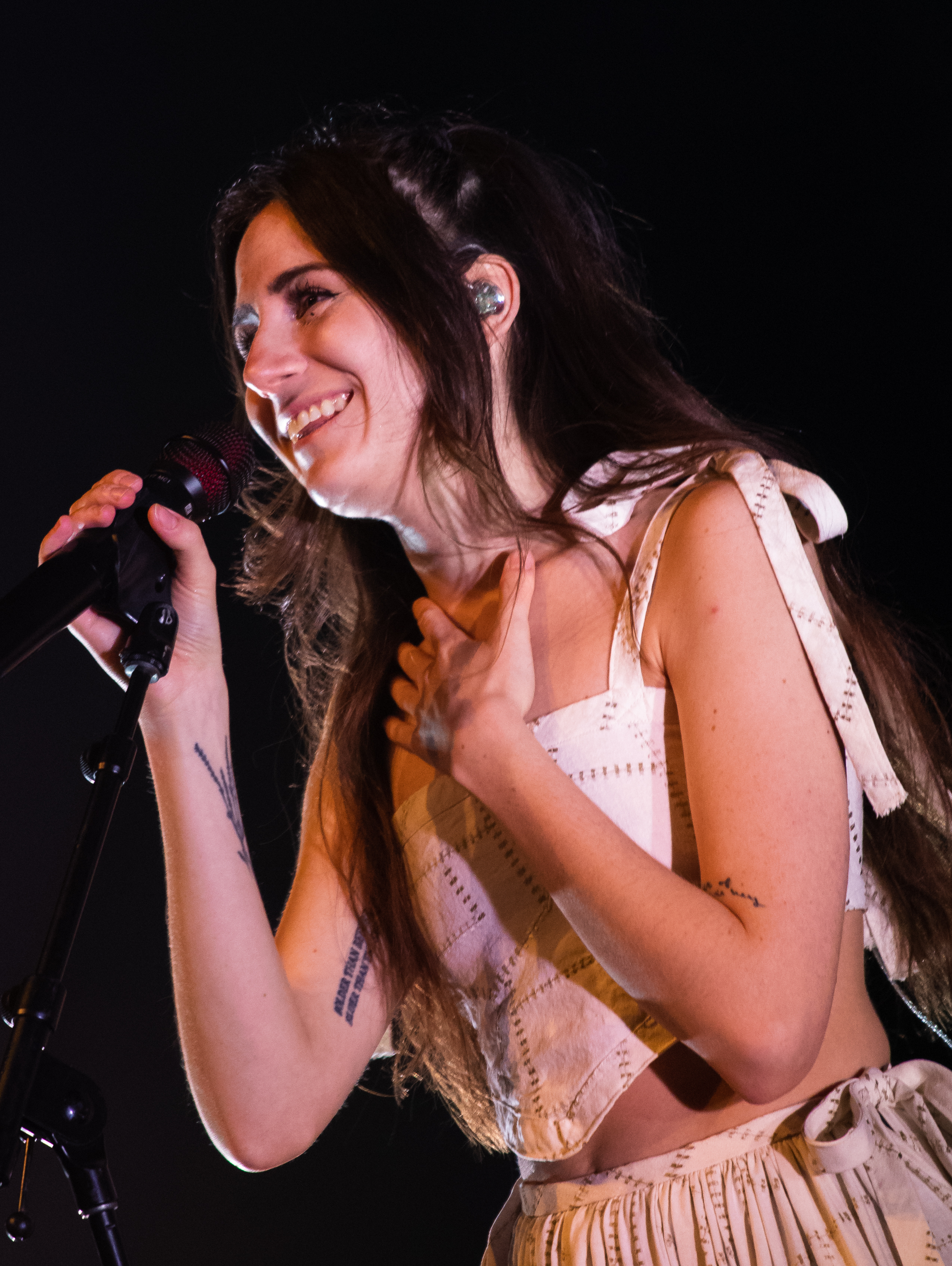
- Dodie in 2022

Background information
- Born: Dorothy Miranda Clark; 11 April 1995 (age 31); Epping, Essex, England
- Genres: Pop; indie pop; folk; acoustic; alt pop
- Occupations: Singer; songwriter; author; YouTube personality
- Instruments: Vocals; baritone ukulele; piano; guitar; clarinet
- Label: The Orchard
- Member of: Fizz
- Website: dodie.co
- Other names: dodie, Poppy

Instagram information
- Page: doddleoddle
- Followers: 1 million

TikTok information
- Page: doddleoddle
- Followers: 602 thousand

YouTube information
- Channel: doddleoddle
- Years active: 2011–present
- Subscribers: 1.97 million
- Views: 460 million
- Last updated: April 8, 2026

Dorothy Miranda Clark (born 11 April 1995), known mononymously as Dodie (stylised dodie), is an English singer, songwriter, author and YouTuber. She (Note: Dodie uses both she/her and they/them pronouns. This article uses she/her for consistency.) has released two studio albums: Build a Problem (2021), which peaked at number 3 on the UK Albums Chart, and Not for Lack of Trying (2025). She has also released four independent extended plays (EPs): Intertwined (2016), You (2017), Human (2019), and Hot Mess (2022), the first three of which charted in the top 40 of the UK Albums Chart. In 2023, she co-founded a band, Fizz, with her friends Orla Gartland, Greta Isaac, and Martin Luke Brown.

Dodie has collaborated with musicians including Tessa Violet, Julia Nunes, Lauren Aquilina, Orla Gartland, Thomas Sanders, Ben Folds, Jacob Collier, Emma Blackery, Pomplamoose, Laufey, Flashback and Jeff Goldblum.

== Biography ==
=== Early life, family and education ===
Dorothy Miranda Clark was born on 11 April 1995 in Epping, Essex. She has a brother, Iain, and a sister, Heather. She learned to play the recorder before her front teeth came in and also learned the clarinet.

At age 12, on 1 August 2007, Dodie created her first YouTube channel, "Dodders5", now known as the "Alice and Dodie show!", shared with her friend Alice Webb.

Dodie attended the Leventhorpe School in Sawbridgeworth, Hertfordshire but decided against post-secondary education.

=== Career ===
==== 2007–2016: YouTube beginnings and Intertwined ====
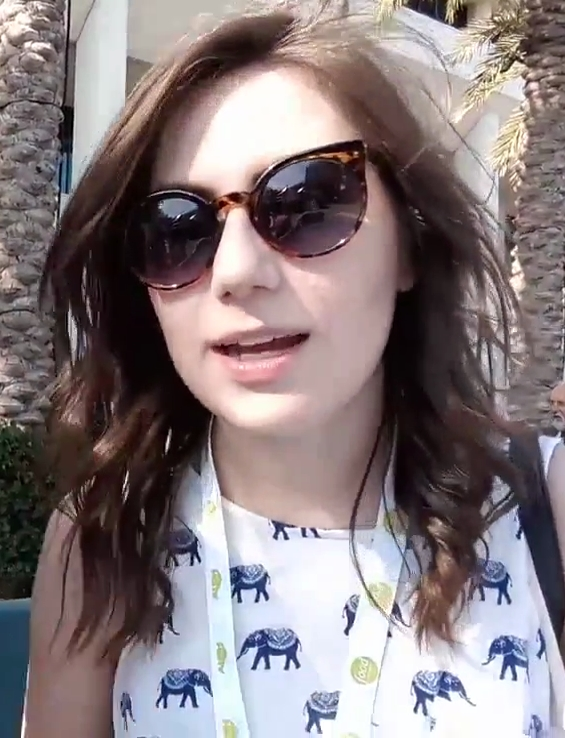
Dodie in 2016

Dodie's main channel "doddleoddle" was created on 7 February 2011; her first video on that channel, an original song, "Rain", was uploaded on 14 April 2011. She also created a side channel, "doddlevloggle", on 28 January 2012. In addition to music, primarily cover versions, her channels included many vlogs, discussing subjects such as relationships and depression.

At age 18, Dodie moved to Bath, Somerset, living with a friend. She had a difficult time there, being poor and in a bad relationship. She moved back with her parents and then moved to London to live with fellow YouTuber and friend Evan Edinger.

In 2014, she uploaded the original song "She", written about having sapphic feelings.

In July 2016, Dodie co-hosted Coca-Cola's CokeTV YouTube channel alongside fellow YouTuber Manny Brown.

In November 2016, she self-released her first EP, Intertwined. Despite its unsigned status, the EP reached number 35 on the official UK album charts during its first week of release.

In December 2016, she created a Vevo channel, "dodieVEVO", and released a music video for "Sick of Losing Soulmates".

==== 2017–2019: You, Secrets for the Mad and Human ====
Dodie's second EP, You, was released in August 2017 and debuted at number 6 on the UK Albums Chart—29 places higher than the peak of Intertwined, a new personal best. It also debuted at number 55 on the US Billboard 200.

Dodie's autobiographical book, Secrets for the Mad: Obsessions, Confessions and Life Lessons, was published in November 2017.

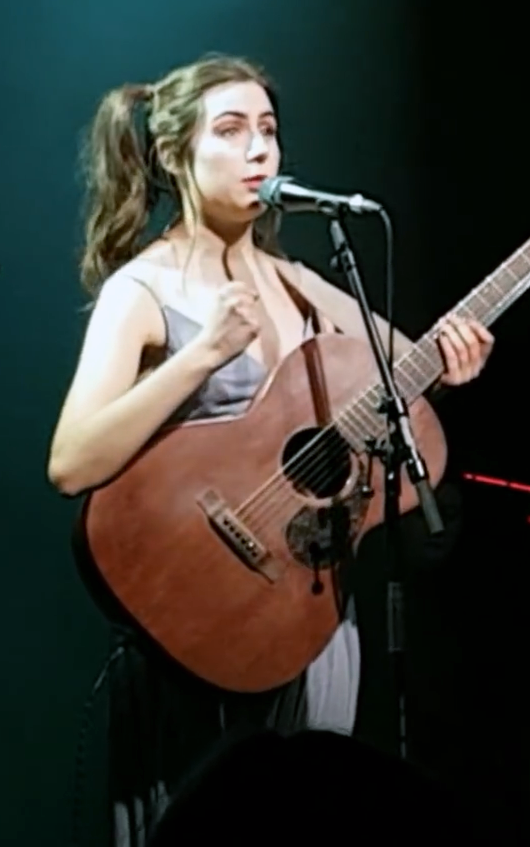
Dodie performing in Brussels, Belgium during her You Tour in 2018

In 2018, she was featured in a collaboration with Faultline, a cover version of the 1934 song "All I Do Is Dream of You" which was featured in an advertising campaign by Audi in the UK.

In January 2019, Dodie released the EP, Human, featuring a title track with Tom Walker. The EP rose to number 5 on the official UK Albums Chart.

==== 2019–present: Build a Problem, Hot Mess, Fizz and Not For Lack of Trying ====
In March 2019, she contributed the song "Ready Now" to the Moominvalley soundtrack. In April, she released a cover of the Beatles' "Here Comes the Sun" in collaboration with Jacob Collier. In June, she released a single, "Guiltless". She released the single "Boys Like You" in September.

Her first full-length studio album, Build a Problem, was released in May 2021 after delays due to the COVID-19 pandemic. The first single, "Cool Girl" was premiered on BBC Radio. The album received positive reviews from critics upon release, and debuted at number three on the UK Albums Chart, her charting highest position to date.

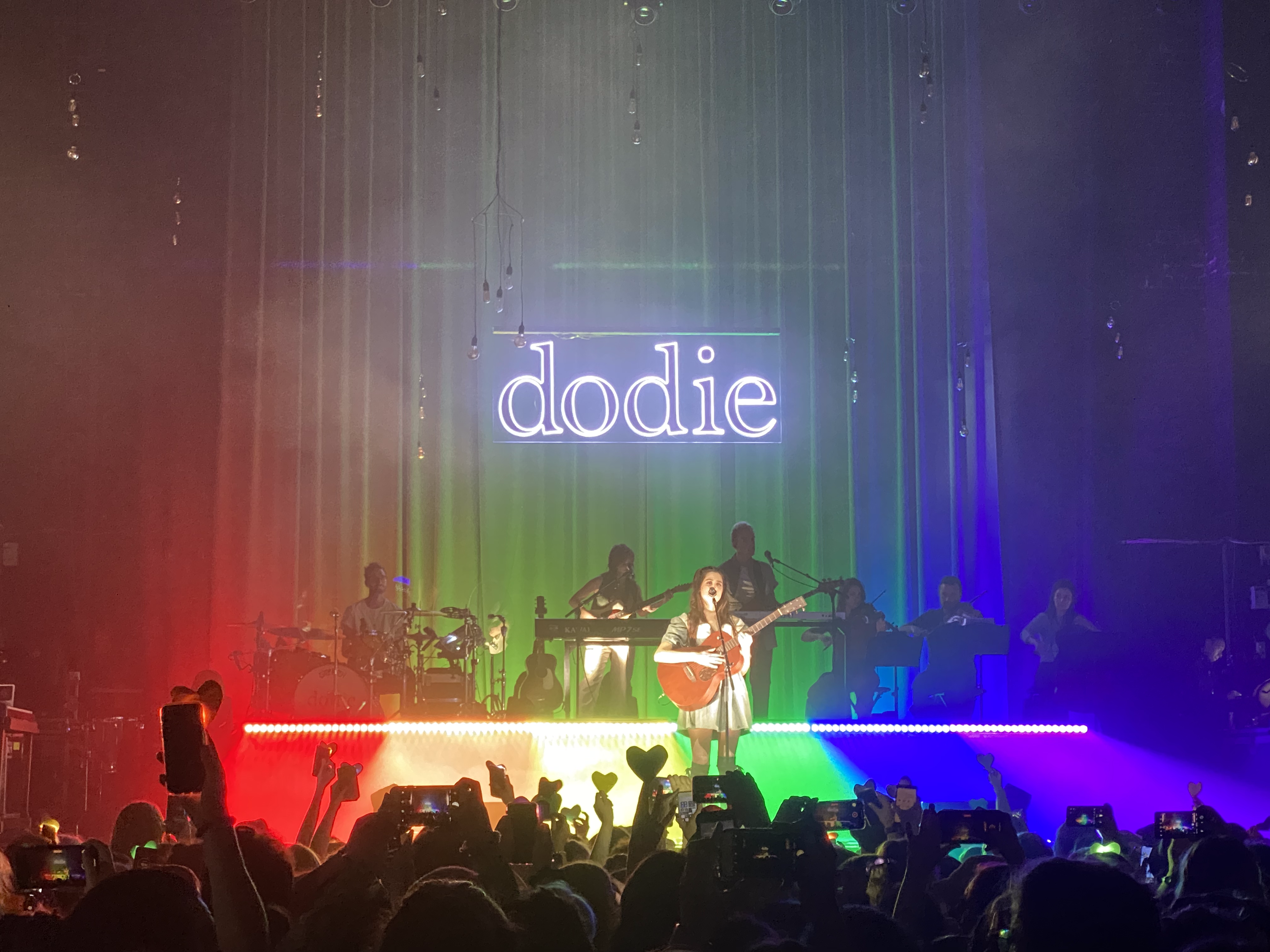
Dodie performing at the O2 Academy Glasgow in September 2021

In 2021, she was a guest composer for the TV show Final Space.

In July 2022, Dodie released "Got Weird", her first solo single since Build a Problem.

In September 2022, she released the EP Hot Mess.

In 2023, she co-founded a band, Fizz, with her friends Orla Gartland, Greta Isaac, and Martin Luke Brown. They released their first single "High in Brighton" in June 2023. Their debut studio album, The Secret to Life, was released in October 2023 through Decca Records. She was featured in "Call Me Wild", a song in collaboration with Cory Wong released in August 2023.

Also in 2023, she was named to the Forbes 30 Under 30 list in the category of European entertainment.

In 2024, Dodie recorded the lead track ("Someone was Listening") for the video game Life Is Strange: Double Exposure.

Dodie recorded a cover of "Old Devil Moon" for the 2025 tribute album Chet Baker Re:imagined. Dodie released her first solo single since 2022, "I'm Fine!", in June 2025.

In August 2025, Dodie released "I Feel Bad For You, Dave", with a music video featuring a cameo by Jeff Goldblum. The song was described as a "tongue-in-cheek track that takes a look at the narcissism displayed by some people".

In September 2025, Dodie released the single "Darling, Angel, Baby", which features Greta Isaac.

In October 2025, Dodie released her second album, Not for Lack of Trying, including the single "I Feel Bad For You, Dave".

Dodie was featured on a version of "Mean to Me" by Jeff Goldblum and The Mildred Snitzer Orchestra, released in February 2026.

In 2022, Dodie performed a Tiny Desk Concert with NPR featuring Orla Gartland, with songs from her EP Hot Mess.

== Artistry ==
Dodie called Oh Wonder's Josephine Vander West her first "first singer-songwriter love". In a 2019 interview with The Line of Best Fit, dodie named folk artist Laura Marling her songwriting inspiration. Her other musical influences have included Regina Spektor, Ingrid Michaelson, the Staves, Darwin Deez, and Bon Iver.

== Personal life ==
In May 2016, Dodie came out as bisexual in a YouTube video. In 2017, she released a song entitled "I'm bisexual—a coming out song!".

Dodie lives in London. She is close friends with Evan Edinger and they lived together in 2017.

Dodie is diagnosed with depersonalization-derealization disorder and said that "sometimes it feels likes I'm not real or dreaming and it's caused me to have depression and all sorts of nasty things."

== Awards and nominations ==
Year	Award	Category	Nominee	Result
2017	Shorty Awards	YouTube Musician	Dodie	Won
2017	Summer in the City Awards	Breakthrough Award	Dodie	Won
2017	Summer in the City Awards	Song of the Year	"6/10"	Nominated
2017	Streamy Awards	Breakthrough Artist	Dodie	Nominated
2018	Summer in the City Awards	Book of the Year	Secrets for the Mad: Obsessions, Confessions and Life Lessons	Nominated
2019	Independent Music Awards	Best Song - Folk/Singer-Songwriter	"If I'm Being Honest"	Nominated

== Discography ==
- Build a Problem (2021)
- Not For Lack of Trying (2025)

As part of Fizz

- The Secret to Life (2023)

== Tours ==
=== Headlining ===
- Intertwined Tour (2017)
- You Tour (2017–2018)
- The Spring Tour (2018)
- Human Tour (2019)
- Build a Problem Tour (2021–2022)
- Not for Lack of Trying (2025-2026) UK, Europe and North America
- Not for Lack of Clarinets (2026) 7 dates across the UK and North America
