= Ronan Keating discography =

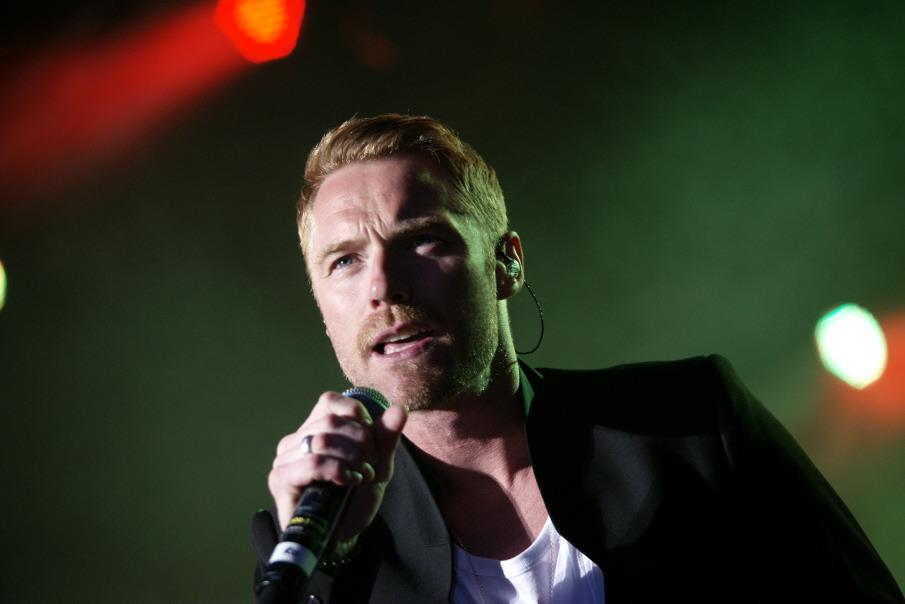
- Keating performing in 2012
- Studio albums: 12
- Live albums: 4
- Compilation albums: 1
- Singles: 32
- Music videos: 28

Irish pop singer Ronan Keating has released twelve studio albums, one compilation album and thirty-two singles. His solo career started in 1999 and has spawned nine albums. He gained worldwide attention when his single "When You Say Nothing at All" was featured in the film Notting Hill and peaked at number one in several countries. As a solo artist, he has sold over 20 million records worldwide alongside the 25 million records with Boyzone.

== Albums ==
=== Studio albums ===
Title	Album details	Peak chart positions										Certifications (sales thresholds)
Title	Album details	IRE	AUS	AUT	GER	NL	NZ	NOR	SWE	SWI	UK	Certifications (sales thresholds)
Ronan	Released: 31 July 2000; Label: Polydor (#5491042); Formats: CD, cassette	2	5	10	2	8	2	1	3	4	1	ARIA: 3× Platinum; BPI: 4× Platinum
Destination	Released: 17 May 2002; Label: Polydor (#5497892); Formats: CD, cassette	3	3	2	1	4	1	2	5	3	1	ARIA: 2× Platinum; BPI: 2× Platinum
Turn It On	Released: 16 November 2003; Label: Polydor (#9865882); Formats: CD, cassette	57	25	45	18	89	—	29	54	19	21	ARIA: Gold; BPI: Gold
Bring You Home	Released: 2 June 2006; Label: Polydor (#9858406); Formats: CD, digital download	16	6	10	7	89	7	—	10	3	3	ARIA: Platinum; BPI: Gold
Songs for My Mother	Released: 13 March 2009; Label: Polydor (#060252700856); Formats: CD, digital download	1	1	34	14	8	1	7	—	13	1	ARIA: Platinum; BPI: Gold
Winter Songs	Titled Stay in Australia and New Zealand; Released: 13 November 2009; Label: Polydor (#2720982); Formats: CD, digital download	12	24	—	73	14	25	—	—	74	16	ARIA: Gold; BPI: Gold
Duet	Released: 12 November 2010 (Australia and New Zealand only); Label: Universal Music Australia (#2756385); Formats: CD, digital download	—	3	—	—	—	1	—	—	—	—	ARIA: Platinum; RMNZ: 2× Platinum
When Ronan Met Burt	Released: 21 March 2011; Label: Polydor (#2765649); Formats: CD, digital download	5	3	—	—	—	9	—	56	—	3	ARIA: Gold; BPI: Gold
Fires	Released: 3 September 2012; Label: Polydor (#3707780); Formats: CD, digital download	12	12	51	20	35	18	—	—	26	5	
Time of My Life	Released: 12 February 2016; Label: Decca (#4773362); Formats: CD, digital download	26	6	44	25	68	26	—	—	16	4	
Twenty Twenty	Released: 24 July 2020; Label: Decca; Formats: CD, digital download, streaming	22	9	47	24	—	11	—	—	—	2	BPI: Silver
Songs from Home	Released: 12 November 2021; Label: Decca; Formats: CD, digital download, streaming	20	80	—	80	—	—	—	—	70	15	
"—" denotes the album failed to chart or was not released.

=== Live albums ===
Title	Album details
Live 2013	Released: 2013; Label: Concertlive ( CLCD448); Formats: 2×CD, digital download; Note: Recorded live at 02 Apollo Manchester, UK on 2 February 2013.
Live 2013	Released: 2013; Label: Concertlive ( CLCD508); Formats: 2×CD, digital download; Note Recorded live at 02 Apollo Manchester, UK on 3 February 2013.
Live 2013	Released: 2013; Label: Concertlive ( CLCD805); Formats: 2×CD, digital download; Note Recorded live at LG Arena in Birmingham, UK on 25 January 2013.
Live 2013	Released: 2013; Label: Concertlive ( CLCD806); Formats: 2×CD, digital download; Note Recorded live at Colton Hall in Bristol, UK on 16 January 2013.

=== Compilation albums ===
Title	Album details	Peak chart positions										Certifications
Title	Album details	IRE	AUS	AUT	GER	NL	NZ	NOR	SWE	SWI	UK	Certifications
10 Years of Hits	Released: 18 October 2004; Label: Polydor (#9868571); Formats: CD, digital download	5	13	13	7	16	4	3	4	8	1	ARIA: 4× Platinum; BPI: 4× Platinum; IFPI: 2× Platinum; RMNZ: Gold

=== Box sets ===
Title	Album details
Ronan / Destination	Released: 7 May 2010; Label: Polydor (#060075326059); Formats: CD, digital download

== Singles ==
=== As lead artist ===
Title	Year	Peak chart positions										Certifications (sales thresholds)	Album
Title	Year	IRE	AUS	AUT	FRA	GER	NL	NZ	SWE	SWI	UK	Certifications (sales thresholds)	Album
"When You Say Nothing at All"	1999	1	3	5	41	6	5	1	2	4	1	ARIA: Platinum; BPI: 2× Platinum; RMNZ: 2× Platinum	Ronan
"Life Is a Rollercoaster"	2000	1	6	13	69	10	14	2	2	11	1	ARIA: Gold; BPI: Platinum; RMNZ: Gold	Ronan
"The Way You Make Me Feel"	2000	8	27	—	—	65	—	8	—	52	6		Ronan
"In This Life"	2000	45	—	—	—	—	—	—	—	—	—		Ronan
"Lovin' Each Day"	2001	4	21	26	56	14	23	9	16	26	2	BPI: Gold; RMNZ: Gold	Ronan
"If Tomorrow Never Comes"	2002	3	3	1	9	5	2	3	4	7	1	ARIA: Platinum; BPI: Platinum; RMNZ: Platinum	Destination
"I Love It When We Do"	2002	12	32	42	—	56	—	—	49	41	5		Destination
"We've Got Tonight" (featuring Lulu or Jeanette)	2002	10	12	6	—	7	11	46	25	25	4	ARIA: Gold	Destination
"Je T'aime Plus Que Tout" (featuring Cécilia Cara)	2003	—	—	—	11	—	—	—	—	17	—		Destination
"Love Won't Work (If We Don't Try)"	2003	—	—	—	—	—	—	23	—	—	—		Destination
"The Long Goodbye"	2003	10	49	45	—	44	—	47	—	70	3		Destination
"When You Say Nothing at All" (featuring Paulina Rubio or Deborah Blando)	2003	—	—	—	—	—	—	—	—	—	—		Destination
"Lost for Words"	2003	23	—	70	—	49	—	47	48	44	9		Turn It On
"She Believes (In Me)"	2004	17	33	30	—	22	—	—	53	—	2		Turn It On
"Last Thing on My Mind" (featuring LeAnn Rimes)	2004	10	—	33	—	50	—	—	—	44	5		Turn It On
"I Hope You Dance"	2004	4	—	—	—	52	—	—	—	49	2		10 Years of Hits
"Father and Son" (featuring Yusuf Islam)	2004	16	—	41	—	27	—	—	37	41	2	BPI: Gold	10 Years of Hits
"Baby Can I Hold You"	2005	—	—	—	—	42	—	—	—	—	—		10 Years of Hits
"All Over Again" (featuring Kate Rusby)	2006	11	—	—	—	—	—	—	—	—	6		Bring You Home
"Iris"	2006	30	—	22	—	24	—	—	—	29	15		Bring You Home
"This I Promise You"	2006	80	—	—	—	—	—	—	—	—	—		Bring You Home
"Time After Time"	2009	—	—	—	—	—	—	—	46	—	88		Songs for My Mother
"This Is Your Song"	2009	—	—	—	—	—	—	—	—	—	—		Songs for My Mother
"Stay"	2009	—	—	—	—	—	—	—	—	—	129		Winter Songs
"It's Only Christmas" (featuring Kate Ceberano)	2009	—	—	—	—	88	—	—	—	—	—		Winter Songs
"Believe Again" (featuring Paulini)	2010	—	73	—	—	—	—	—	—	—	—		Duet
"What the World Needs Now"	2011	—	—	—	—	—	—	—	—	—	—		When Ronan Met Burt
"Fires"	2012	90	64	—	—	—	—	—	—	—	76		Fires
"Wasted Light"	2012	—	—	—	—	—	—	—	—	—	181		Fires
"Let Me Love You"	2016	—	—	—	—	—	—	—	—	—	—		Time of My Life
"Breathe"	2016	—	—	—	—	—	—	—	—	—	—		Time of My Life
"Summer Wonderland"	2016	—	—	—	—	—	—	14	—	—	—		Non-album single
"One of a Kind" (with Emeli Sandé)	2020	—	—	—	—	—	—	—	—	—	—		Twenty Twenty
"Little Thing Called Love"	2020	—	—	—	—	—	—	—	—	—	—		Twenty Twenty
"Love Will Remain" (with Clare Bowen)	2020	—	—	—	—	—	—	—	—	—	—		Twenty Twenty
"Forever Ain't Enough"	2020	—	—	—	—	—	—	—	—	—	—		Twenty Twenty
"The One" (Christmas version) (with Nina Nesbitt)	2020	—	—	—	—	—	—	—	—	—	—		Twenty Twenty
"Forever and Ever, Amen" (with Shania Twain)	2021	—	—	—	—	—	—	—	—	—	—		Twenty Twenty
"The Blower's Daughter"	2021	—	—	—	—	—	—	—	—	—	—		Songs from Home
"Heyday"	2021	—	—	—	—	—	—	—	—	—	—		Songs from Home
"The Parting Glass" (Christmas version)	2021	—	—	—	—	—	—	—	—	—	—		Songs from Home
"—" denotes releases that did not chart or were not released in that territory.

=== As featured artist ===
Title	Year	Peak chart positions	Album
Title	Year	IRE	Album
"These Days" (Brian Kennedy featuring Ronan Keating)	1999	4	Now That I Know What I Want
"Don't Stop Me Eatin'" (LadBaby featuring Ronan Keating)	2020	93	Non-album singles
"This Is Your Song" (Mount Sion Choir featuring Ronan Keating)	2021	—	Non-album singles

== Other charted songs ==
Title	Year	Peak chart positions	Album
Title	Year	IRE	Album
"Signed, Sealed, Delivered I'm Yours"	2014	45	Postman Pat: The Movie

== Other appearances ==
Title	Year	Album
"The Town I Loved So Well" (Phil Coulter featuring Ronan Keating)	2000	The Songs I Love So Well
“Il Volo (The Flight)” (Zucchero featuring Ronan Keating)	2004	Zu & Co.
“Lovers and Friends” (Bee Gees featuring Ronan Keating)	2005	Love Songs
"Danny Boy" (Bryn Terfel featuring Ronan Keating)	2008	Scarborough Fair – Songs from the British Isles
"All I Want Is You" (Brian McFadden featuring Ronan Keating)	2013	The Irish Connection
"Falling Slowly" (Kimberley Walsh featuring Ronan Keating)	2013	Centre Stage
"When We Say It's Forever" (The McClymonts featuring Ronan Keating)	2017	Endless
"Say We'll Meet Again" (Alexandra Burke featuring Ronan Keating)	2018	The Truth Is
"Smalltown Boy" (Alex Christensen and the Berlin Orchestra featuring Ronan Keating)	2022	Classical 80s Dance

== Music videos ==
Title	Year	Director(s)
"When You Say Nothing at All"	1999	Kevin Godley
"Life Is a Rollercoaster"	2000	Marcus Nispel
"The Way You Make Me Feel"	2000	Max & Dania
"Lovin' Each Day"	2001	Super America
"Love Won't Work (If We Don't Try)"	2001	—N/a
"If Tomorrow Never Comes"	2002	Kevin Godley
"I Love It When We Do"	2002	Julien Temple
"We've Got Tonight" (Italian version with Giorgia)	2002	—N/a
"We've Got Tonight" (UK version with Lulu)	2002	—N/a
"We've Got Tonight" (German version with Jeanette Biedermann)	2002	—N/a
"Je T'aime Plus Que Tout"	2003	2totors
"The Long Goodbye"	2003	Norman Watson
"When You Say Nothing at All" (Duet with Paulina Rubio)	2003	—N/a
"Lost for Words"	2003	Norman Watson
"She Believes (In Me)"	2004	Lindy Heymann
"Last Thing on My Mind"	2004	Urban Ström
"I Hope You Dance"	2004	—N/a
"Father and Son"	2004	Kevin Godley
"Baby Can I Hold You"	2005	—N/a
"All Over Again"	2006	Simon Levene
"Iris"	2006	—N/a
"This I Promise You"	2006	—N/a
"Time After Time"	2009	—N/a
"Make You Feel My Love"	2009	—N/a
"This Is Your Song"	2009	—N/a
"Stay"	2009	—N/a
"Believe Again"	2010	—N/a
"What the World Needs Now"	2011	—N/a
"Fires"	2012	Phil Griffin
"Wasted Light"	2012	Helene Spencer
"Let Me Love You"	2016	Michael O'Brien, Bart Baker
"Breathe"	2016	Phil Griffin
"Summer Wonderland"	2016	
"One of a Kind"	2020	
"Little Thing Called Love"	2020	
