= Don Mescall =

Irish singer and songwriter

- Born: County Limerick, Ireland
- Genres: Acoustic / country / folk rock
- Occupations: Musician, singer-songwriter, composer
- Years active: 1994–present
- Label: AGR Television Records
- Website: donmescall.com

Don Mescall is an Irish singer and songwriter from County Limerick. He splits his time between the United Kingdom, Ireland, and the United States.

== Early career ==
Having played in pubs and clubs around Ireland, Mescall landed the job of opening for Richie Havens at the Mean Fiddler in London. Mescall began his set with a new song, "Paradise". Havens liked the song so much that he recorded "Paradise" for his 2002 "Wishing Well" album.

== Songwriting ==
As a songwriter, Don Mescall works alone and also collaborates with other artists/songwriters. In previous years, he was based in Nashville.

Mescall has had songs recorded by a wide range of artists, including Rascal Flatts, Clay Aiken, Backstreet Boys, Ronan Keating, Boyzone, Jaydee Bixby, Ramin Karimloo, Aslan, Garou, Geri Halliwell, Neal McCoy, Sharon Corr, Daniel Boys, Cliff Richard, and Richie Havens.

Mescall's song, "Secret Smile," was included on the Rascal Flatts album Still Feels Good, which debuted at the No.1 position in the Billboard 200 album chart and the Billboard Country Chart. Weeks later, the Backstreet Boys entered the Billboard 200 album charts at No. 7 with their album "Unbreakable" which featured Mescall's song, "Trouble Is". This meant Mescall had 2 songs featured on albums in the top ten of the Billboard 200 chart during the week of 17 November 2007. In recent years, Don has featured six songs on Marina Kaye's "Fearless" Album, which went triple platinum in France (2015). Mescall had a Number 1 Irish country single in 2016 with Nathan Carter's "Wanna dance" from the album "Staying up all night" on Decca records.

Again, he had a number 1 single with (Nathan Carter)'s 'Livin' the Dream'. He also achieved Number 1 in Irish Country charts in 2018 with Nathan Carter's single "This song is for you". Also in 2017, Mescall had a number 1 song with "Angels in Chains" (Geri Halliwell); the single reached number one in Argentina, Peru, and Spain.

In February 2017, Mescall received an Irish World Lifetime Achievement Award for songwriting and production. He received the Songwriter of the Year award at the Irish Post Country Music Awards 2017 on 30 August 2017.

After having success writing for other artists, Mescall released his own album 'Lighthouse Keeper' in November 2018. It debuted at #1 on the Irish Independent Album charts in November 2018.

On 16 August 2019, 'Live Long Rock & Roll' was released. It was a tribute single for Henry McCollough, written by Don Mescall and McCollough, and performed by a super band, the McCollough Fusileers. It was released on Ballywonderland records. The band featured Nick Mason on drums, Sir Paul McCartney on bass, Albert Lee on electric guitar, Chris Stainton on Hammond and keyboards, Gary Brooker with lead vocals, Paul Brady and Paul Carrick with backing vocals, Fiachra Trench on strings, and the London Community Gospel Choir as backing vocals. The song was mixed by Steve Lipson and produced by Mescall. The single was featured on the Ballywonderland album by Henry McCollough.

== Eurosong 2011 ==
Mescall participated in the Irish Eurovision Song competition on a Late Late Show Eurosong Special on Friday, 11 February 2011. Having been 'mentored' by Ronan Hardiman, the pair co-wrote their entry for the competition, "Talking with Jennifer." They placed third with a total score of 68 points.

== "The Voice of Ireland" 2012 ==
Mescall was invited to act as an assistant coach on the new Irish TV production of "The Voice of Ireland," which was filmed in Dublin in November 2011. He assisted his friend and co-writer Sharon Corr while appearing on the show, which aired at the end of January 2012.

== Personal life ==
Don Mescall is originally from the parish of Ahane/Lisnagry in County Limerick. He has eight sisters and two brothers. He has also been a vegetarian for more than 20 years.

== Discography ==
1. Sunset of Gold – EP
2. Lucky Star – EP (2004)
3. Last Chance – EP (2004)
4. Left in L.A. – single (2005)
5. You Don't Love Me – EP (2005)
6. Innocent Run – album (2006)
7. Fuel for the Fire – EP (2007)
8. Lighthouse Keeper – album (2018)

=== Songs written for other artists ===
Mescall's songs feature on the following albums, selling more than four million records worldwide:

Artist	Album	Song	Release date
Frances Black	Talk To Me (single)	Two Strong Hearts	1994
Eleanor Shanley	Road to Glory (single)	Road to Glory	1995
Eleanor Shanley	Eleanor Shanley	Road to Glory	1995
Frances Black	The Smile on Your Face	You're Still The Only One	1996
Natalie Withers	Simple Perfect	Sunset of Gold	2002
Richie Havens	Wishing Well	Paradise	23 April 2002
Frances Black	Magdalen Laundry (single)	Magdalen Laundry	2003
Frances Black	How High The Moon	Magdalen Laundry, 24 Hours, Rachrai Island, Lucky Star	2003
Lulu	Back on Track	Time To Fall	7 March 2004
Maryla Rodowicz	Maryla Rodowicz	Beautiful Regret	2005
Neal McCoy	That's Life	All Over Again	23 August 2005
Michael Foret	Forte	Cold Out	1 January 2006
Brian Kennedy	All Over The World (single)	All Over The World	2006
Brian Kennedy	Homebird	All Over The World	2006
Ronan Keating	All Over Again (single)	All Over Again duet with Kate Rusby	29 May 2006
Ronan Keating	Bring You Home	All Over Again (Feat. Kate Rusby)	29 May 2006
Ronan Keating & Rita Guerra	All Over Again (Portuguese Release)	All Over Again	May 2006
Ronan Keating & Rita Comisi	All Over Again (Italian release)	All Over Again	May 2006
Kelly Chen	Especial Kelly	All Over Again (duet with Ronan Keating)	21 December 2006
Hummingbird	Tougher Than Love	Grace of God	2007
Floortje Smit	Fearless	All Over Again (duet with Ronan Keating)	20 April 2007
Rascal Flatts	Still Feels Good	Secret Smile	25 September 2007
Backstreet Boys	Unbreakable	Trouble Is	24 October 2007
Frances Black	The Essential Frances Black	24 Hours, Magdelen Laundry, Rachrai Island	2008
The High Kings	Fields of Glory (single)	Fields of Glory	2008
The High Kings	The High Kings	Fields of Glory	2008
Eva Avila	Give Me the Music	You Don't Say No	2008
Jon Peter Lewis	Break The Silence	No Fire	2008
Garou	Heaven's Table (single)	Heaven's Table	2008
Garou	Piece of My Soul	Heaven's Table, What's The Time in NYC, Beautiful Regret	6 May 2008
Clay Aiken	On My Way Here	Grace of God	6 May 2008
The High Kings	Fields of Glory Special Edition GAA Football Final (Irish Independent)	Fields of Glory	21 September 2008
Theo Tams	Give It All Away	Reckless	2009
Cathy Maguire	Portrait	Nothing But Blue	17 April 2009
Lynn Hilary	Take Me With You	Sunset of Gold, Shona Mara, Take Me With You, Melody of Life, Erin Beo, Road to Glory	21 April 2009
Rascal Flatts	14 Love Songs for the 14th	Secret Smile	9 February 2010
Boyzone	Brother	Too Late For Hallelujah	8 March 2010
Jaydee Bixby	Easy To Love	Closer Than You Think	25 May 2010
Anne Brennan	Young Love	You're Still The Only One	1 May 2011
Luke Dickens	Devil in the Wind	I'm Givin In	9 September 2011
Jane McNamee	How Do I Tell Them	You're Still the Only One	20 September 2011
The New Cities	Kill the Lights	The Hype	27 September 2011
The Three Amigos	Radio Pictures	Radio Paints, Your Dress, Bandeleros, Champagne	30 November 2011
Aslan	Nudie Books and Frenchies	Too Late For Hallelujah	April 2012
Ramin Karimloo	Ramin	Constant Angel, Eyes of a Child, Broken Home, Show me Light	9 April 2012
Chila Lynn	Real Woman	Sparkle	24 April 2012
Brian Kennedy	Voice	Broken Crown	5 June 2012
Ronan Keating	Fires	The One You Love Tonight	Sept 2012
Richie Hayes	What About Me	Free World, Walk You Home	8 November 2012
Aslan & Don Mescall	In Aid of Pieta House	Catch Your Fall	April 2013
Kirsty Bertarelli ft Ronan Keating	Send Out a Message (To the World) (single)	Send Out a Message (To the World)	29 April 2013
Lonestar	Life As We Know It	With My Eyes Open	June 2013
Sharon Corr	The Same Sun	We Could Be Lovers, Edge of Nowhere, Full Circle, You Say, The Runaround, The Same Sun, Christmas Night	Oct 2013
Boyzone	BZ20	Rise, Heaven Is, The Hour Before Christmas	25 November 2013
Richie Hayes	What About Me	Free World, Walk You Home	8 November 2012
Kirsty Bertarelli	Indigo Shores	There She Goes, Disappeared	12 May 2014
Marina Kaye	Homeless EP	Live Before I Die, Price I've Had to Pay	16 June 2014
Giulia	Radio Junky (single)	Radio Junky	17 August 2014
Aslan	Bullets & Diamonds	Too Late For Hallelujah	13 October 2014
Lisa McHugh	A Life That's Good	Hey I'm a Woman	24 October 2014
Kirsty Bertarelli	The Ghosts of Christmas Past-EP	The Ghosts of Christmas Past	14 November 2014
MacKenzie Porter	The Hour Before Christmas (single)	The Hour Before Christmas	24 November 2014
Marina Kaye	Fearless	Live Before I Die, Price I've Had to Pay	18 May 2015
The Three Amigos	On the Road Again - The Essential Collection	Radio Paints, Your Dress Looks Its Best, Bandeleros, Champagne	20 November 2015
Nathan Carter	Stayin Up All Night	Wanna Dance	29 April 2016
Nathan Carter	Livin' the Dream (single)	Livin' the Dream	2017
Nathan Carter	Gone girls (single)	Livin' the Dream	June 2017
Nathan Carter	this song is for you (single)		feb 2018
Geri Halliwell	Angels in Chains (single)	Angels in Chains	19 June 2017
Cliff Richard	Rise Up (Album)	There's One	August 2018
Laurie LeBlanc	when its right its right (Album)	when its right its right (single) the bigger the better ( single) gone girls ( single) Ive Never Known (single) the belle of the ball, I'm in Love	5 June 2020
Brett Eldredge	Sunday Drive(Album )	Sunday Drive (single)	July 2020
Sharon Corr	The fool and the scorpion (Album )	the heart is a lonely hunter, A Thousand Lives	6 June 2021
Christy Dignam	The Man who stayed alive (Album)	High (single) What if tonight is all we have ( single) Lucky Star, Hazy Sunshine, Shame the Devil, song for Kathryn, I feel alive, I can't imagine	Oct 2021

=== Compilations, soundtracks and DVDs ===
CD Title	Song title	Performing artist	Release date
Absolute Irish	Road To Glory	Eleanor Shanley	1995
Celtic Heartbeat	Road To Glory	Eleanor Shanley	1995
Only One Degree of Separation	Sunset of Gold, Paradise	Don Mescall	2000
A Woman's Heart: A Decade On	24 Hours	Frances Black	11 November 2002
A Woman's Heart: Trilogy	24 Hours	Frances Black	2 February 2004
The Dome Vol. 40	All Over Again	Ronan Keating &Kate Rusby	1 December 2006
Now 64	All Over Again	Ronan Keating & Kate Rusby	24 July 2006
Chartbuster Karaoke: Rascal Flatts Vol. 2	Secret Smile	Rascal Flatts	1 April 2008
Hot Hits Country Karaoke 8 July	Secret Smile	Rascal Flatts	1 July 2008
The Voice Within – Songs of Hope	Voice of Hope, A Not Too Ordinary Day, Grace of God	Peter Corry, Simon Casey	21 July 2008
Precious Moments	You're Still The Only One	Frances Black	

DVD title	Song title	Performing artist	Release date
The Guitar Style of Richie Havens	Paradise	Tuition Video	10 December 2002
Alien Tracker	You Don't Love Me, Left in L.A.	Don Mescall	14 October 2003
Irish Unplugged	Rachrai Island	Frances Black	24 January 2005
The High Kings – Live in Dublin	Fields of Glory	The High Kings	26 February 2008
The Voice Within – Songs of Hope	Voice of Hope, A Not Too Ordinary Day, Grace of God	Peter Corry, Simon Casey	21 July 2008
