= Lonely People (disambiguation) =

"Lonely People" is a song by the band America from the album Holiday. The term may also refer to:

- The English translation of the play "Einsame Menschen" by the German dramatist Gerhart Hauptmann
- Lonely People, an album and its title track by Orla Gartland
- "Neon (Lonely People)", a song by Lena Meyer-Landrut from the album Stardust
- "Lonely People", a song by Demi Lovato from the album Dancing with the Devil... the Art of Starting Over
- "Lonely People", a song by Gotthard from the album Homerun
- "The Lonely People", a song by Void of Vision
