= Romain Gazave =

French figure skater (born 1976)

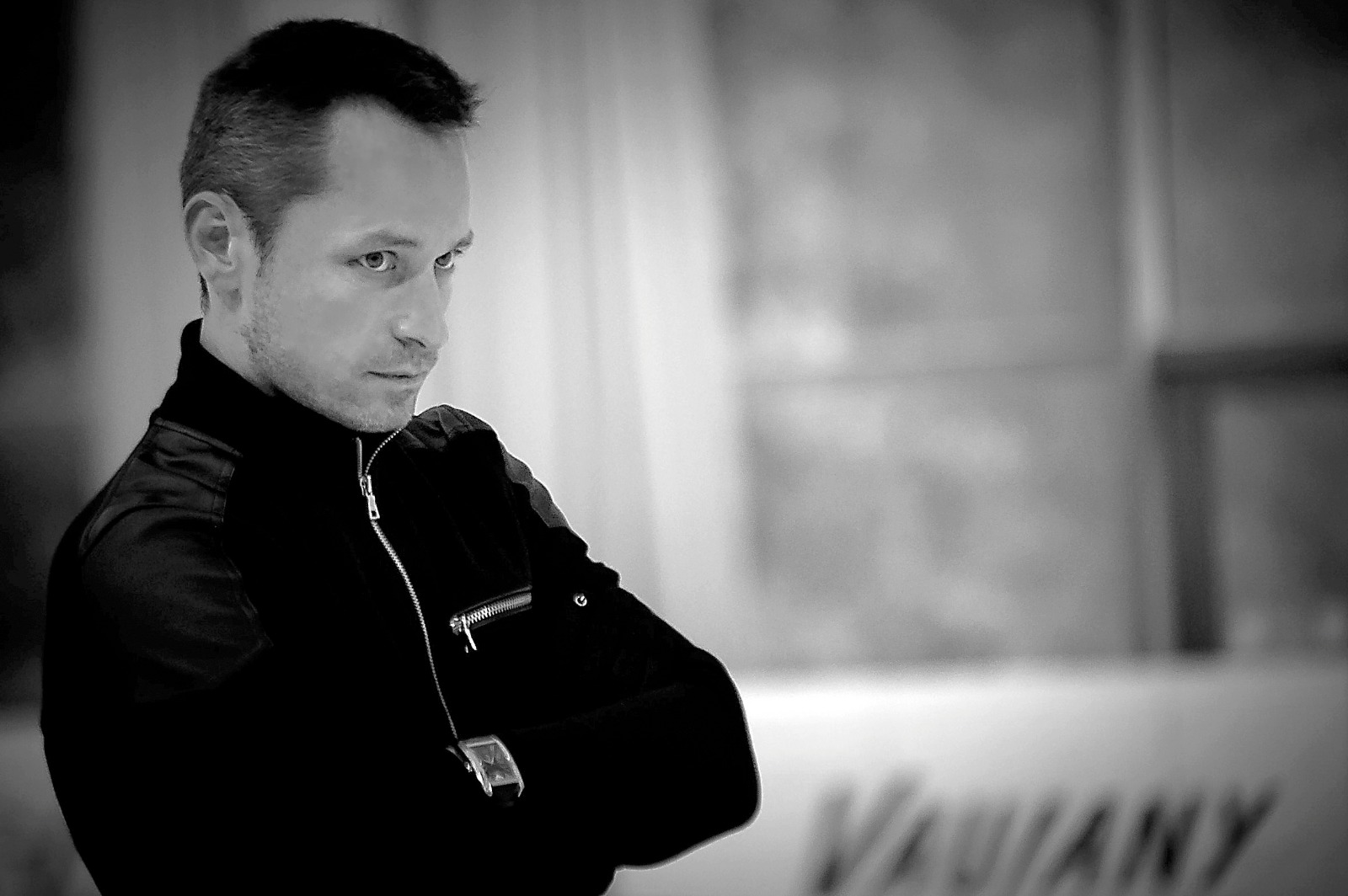

Personal information
- Full name: Romain Gazave
- Born: 11 December 1976 (age 49) Les Arcs, Bourg-Saint-Maurice, France
- Home town: Lyon

Figure skating career
- Country: France

Romain Gazave is a French coach and choreographer, former competitive figure skater and French pianist, born 11 December 1976 in Les Arcs, Bourg-Saint-Maurice (French Alps).

== Figure skating competitive career ==
Member of the French national team and notable alumni from INSEP, Romain was listed SHN (High level sportsman) of the Ministry of Youth and Sports in 1994 and 1995. He became silver medallist at the France national junior championships in 1994 and has participated in numerous international competitions, winning the bronze medal at the ISU Junior Grand Prix in Slovakia in 1994.

== Childhood and sporting career ==
Romain Gazave started figure skating and playing piano at the age of six in Megève. At the age of 12, he joined the CRESA (Regional Center for Sports and Artistic Studies) in Annecy (1988-1992) trained by Didier Monge, Christine Nicolas and Didier Lucine, alongside other skaters such as Vanessa Gusmeroli. After a season spent at the Amiens Patinage Club (1992-1993) where he trained with Patrice Macrez, he became a French national team member in 1993. He then joined the INSEP (1993-1994), where he lived with the future two times medalist at the European championships Stanick Jeannette, trained at that time by Didier Gailhaguet, Annick Dumont and Pierre Trente. The following season, he joined the National Olympic Preparation Center of Colombes (1994-1996) alongside Thierry Cérez and the future twice Olympic medalist Philippe Candeloro. He was trained there by André Brunet, then Philippe Pélissier, and also worked daily with the Russian choreographer Natasha Volkova-Dabbadie.

Following a serious injury contracted in 1994 but empirical, and therefore at high risk of losing his right foot, he underwent a heavy surgery in 1995 followed by 3 weeks of hospitalization so that he could learn to walk again. 8 months of rehabilitation was then necessary for him to later on be able to skate again.

Ending his competitive career, Romain decided to study piano in a professional way. He entered the class of Marian Rybicki in ENMP (Ecole Normale de Musique de Paris) and became a private student of Jean Fassina for 4 years.

== Professional career ==
His interest in entertainment and shows motivated him to begin a professional career in which he decided to combine his two passions: ice skating and piano in the same act, being the only person to do so. From then, he performed around the world in big show productions such as:

- IMG Stars on Ice in 2006 beside Brian Orser, Tatiana Totmianina & Maxim Marinin, Tatiana Navka & Roman Kostomarov, Irina Slutskaya.
- Art On Ice in 2008 beside Kurt Browning, Shizuka Arakawa, Stéphane Lambiel, Sarah Meier, Aliona Savchenko & Robin Szolkowy, Elena Lev, Anatoly Zalievsky, Kim Wilde, Ronan Keating, Gardar Thor Cortes.
- Champions on Ice in 2009 beside Surya Bonaly, Marina Anissina, Oksana Kazakova, Yuliya Obertas & Sergei Slavnov.
- Mama and Mia on Ice, Malaga, 2009

Romain Gazave also presented many duo numbers and piano accompaniments for ice-skating champions, circus artists (from Cirque du Soleil) and famous singers. He also skated for TV Shows such as Dancing on Ice in Turkey (2006) and in the English Show "Hot Ice" in Blackpool from 2004 to 2008.

He worked at times for certain companies as an artistic director and casting advisor.

In June 2010, he decided to realize one of his old dream by entirely producing and releasing his first CD Album, "Personal Thoughts".

In 2011, Romain Gazave has been co-manager of the 1st ever ice-rink located on the 1st floor of the Eiffel Tower in Paris for Crystal Group.

== Coaching and Choreography career ==
Since 2010 Romain Gazave has worked as a guest coach and choreographer for many different clubs and federations around the world. He choreographed many ISU International Medallist and numerous National Champions from Sweden, France, Austria, Bulgaria, Norway, Australia, Slovakia, Poland, Hungaria, Finland and other countries; coached in numerous International Camps, Master-Class, for Federations and Seminars around the world alongside Viktor Kudriavtsev, Brian Orser, Javier Fernandez, Nikolai Morozov, Kurt Browning, he did as well choreography for Shows, TV programs, Galas.

Since 2012, Romain Gazave also direct international figure skating camps, he is the Founder, Director & Head coach of "Ice2impulse" International Camp, taking place every single year during summer in Andorra since 2016. He led, in this camp, a strong team of coaches which includes Kurt Browning, Alissa Czisny, Marina Kudryavsteva, Anna Novichkina, Daniel Peinado, Ruslan Novoseltsev among many others.

== Professional shows and TV specials ==
- WILDROSE (as performer in "Russian Ice Stars" U.K 2010-2013 / as Agent of the company 2013-2017)
- GT MALL PLAZA & Ice Ace Productions in China (Choreographer & Show Director 2014-2015)
- M6 TV CHANNEL (Prime time Live Program) “Ice Show” (Choreographer) 2013, 2014

== Main coaching achievements ==
- Guest Coach & Choreographer in Russia & Sweden with Viktor Kudriavtsev (2015-2019)
- Guest Coach/Choreographer for Austrian National Team "Skate Austria" Workshop (2018-2019)
- Guest Technical Coach & Choreographer at SC "Orlenok" Club, Perm, RUSSIA (2019)
- Choreography of 2 times World champion Miki Ando's Exhibition Program "Mickael Jackson Medley" for "Friends on Ice" Show, Japan (2017)
- Team Leader/Coach at ISU European Championship, Ostrava (2017)
- Coach at “Volkov Memorial” Young Talent Competition, Moscow (2016)
- Coach at ISU Junior Grand-Prix, Courchevel (2015)
- Guest Coach/Choreographer for International Summer Skating Camp with Javier Fernandez and Brian Orser in Invernia, Spain (2015)
- Musical Research & Edit for FS Competition & Exhibition Program of Florent Amodio "Silver at the European Championship" (Season 2012-2013)

== Choreography of National Champions and/or ISU International medalist ==
- (France) Léa Serna
- (Sweden) Andreas Nordebäck
- (France) Anna Kuzmenko
- (Belgium) Denis Krouglov
- (Austria) Stefanie Pesendorfer
- (Bulgaria) Nicky Obreykov
- (Belgium) Jade Hovine
- (Austria) Alisa Stomakhina
- (Slovakia) Michael Neuman
- (Hungary) Andras Csernoch
- (Norway) Marianne Stalen
- (Poland) Colette Kaminski
- (Belgium) Naomie Mugnier
- (France) Landry Le May
- (France) Maxence Collet

== See also ==
- Dancing on Ice (franchise)
