= Rita Comisi =

Italian singer

Rita Comisi (born 16 August 1985 in Itamaraju, Brazil) is an Italian singer who became a finalist of the Italian talent TV-show Amici di Maria De Filippi^{(it.)} (English: Friends of Maria De Filippi) in 2005–2006, winning the critics awards.

She performs songs in Italian and English. Her repertoire includes such songs as:

- Adagio (music "Adagio in G minor" by Tomaso Albinoni);
- Memory (by Andrew Lloyd Webber);
- People;
- Don't Let Me Be Misunderstood;

and others.

In 2006, she sang with Irish singer Ronan Keating on an Italian version of his single "All Over Again", which was included on the Italian edition of Keating's album Bring You Home.

== Discography ==
- "All Over Again", Italian edition (2006, with Ronan Keating).
