= Electric (music producers) =

Norwegian songwriting and production duo

- Origin: Norway
- Genres: Pop, indie
- Occupation(s): Record producers, songwriters, remixers
- Members: Henrik Barman Michelsen; Edvard Førre Erfjord

Electric is a Norwegian songwriting and production duo, composed of Henrik Barman Michelsen and Edvard Førre Erfjord. Perhaps best known for their work with Little Mix on their #1 UK hits "Black Magic" and "Shout Out to My Ex", the latter of which won Single of the Year at the 2017 Brit Awards, as well as UK #1 "I'll Be There" by Jess Glynne, they have worked with artists such as Olly Murs, Machine Gun Kelly, Hailee Steinfeld, The Wanted, Cheryl Cole, LÉON, and Fifth Harmony.

== Background ==
Michelsen and Erfjord met at the Liverpool Institute for Performing Arts, a school cofounded by Sir Paul McCartney. Michelsen was the first person at LIPA to receive the Music Producers Guild (UK) Prize, "a prize aimed at rewarding the most promising student to graduate from LIPA's Sound Technology degree course."

== Discography ==
=== Singles ===
List of singles written or produced by Electric, with selected chart positions, year released and certifications.
Year	Title	Peak chart positions										Certifications
Year	Title	US	US Alt	US Pop	US Hot AC	US Rock	AUS	CAN	NZ	SWE	UK	Certifications
2018	"I'll Be There" (Jess Glynne)						23			55	1	BPI: Platinum; ARIA: Platinum; MC: Gold
2017	"No More Sad Songs" (Little Mix ft. Machine Gun Kelly)	–	–	–	–	–	–	–	9	–	15	BPI: Platinum
2017	"At My Best" (Machine Gun Kelly ft. Hailee Steinfeld)	88	–	–	–	–	87	66	–	–	—	RIAA: Gold
2016	"Shout Out to My Ex" (Little Mix)	69	–	–	–	–	4	37	7	38	1	2017 Brit Awards British Single of the Year; BPI: 2× Platinum; ARIA: 3× Platinum; MC: Platinum
2016	"Hair" (Little Mix ft. Sean Paul)	–	–	–	–	–	10	–	32	–	11	BPI: Platinum; ARIA: 2× Platinum
2016	"Not in Love" (M.O)	–	–	–	–	–	–	–	–	–	42	
2015	"Black Magic" (Little Mix)	67	–	24	–	–	8	52	31	58	1	RIAA: Gold; BPI: 2× Platinum; ARIA: 2× Platinum; MC: Platinum
2015	"Sax" (Fleur East)	–	–	–	–	–	25	–	–	–	3	BPI: Platinum; ARIA: Gold
2015	"Brother" (Ben Haenow)	–	–	–	–	–	–	–	–	–	—	BPI: Gold (album)
2013	"Walks Like Rihanna" (The Wanted)	–	–	–	–	–	32	–	–	–	4	BPI: Silver

=== Full discography ===
Year	Artist	Album	Details
2023	PHIA	"everything's not fine"	Co-writer, Producer
2023	Eyelar	"Care Like You (Acoustic)"	Co-writer
2023	Maisie Peters	"The Last One"	Co-writer, Producer
2023	LÉON	"Dirt"	Co-writer, Co-producer
2023	Brynn Cartelli	"Lucky To Love You"	Co-writer, Co-producer
2023	Mae Muller & Dylan	"Tatiana (feat. Dylan),"	Co-writer, Producer
2023	Mae Muller	"I Wish I Could Hate You"	Co-writer, Producer
2023	Mae Muller	"Little Bit Sad"	Co-writer, Producer
2023	LÉON	"Pretty Boy"	Co-writer, Co-producer
2023	Bo Milli	"Come After Me"	Co-writer, Co-producer
2023	Eyelar	"Care Like You"	Co-writer
2022	Dylan	"Blisters"	Co-writer, Producer
2022	The Future X	"Don't Let Go"	Co-writer, Co-producer
2021	Loren Gray	"Piece of Work"	Production, writing
2021	Syn Cole ft. MIYA MIYA	"Feels Like Love"	Writing
2021	Seeb	Sad in Scandinavia	Production, writing ("Colourblind", "Sleepwalk")
2020	Peter Thomas, gnash	"No One"	Production, writing
2020	Snakehips & Jess Glynne ft. A Boogie Wit Da Hoodie & DaVido	"Lie For You"	Production, writing
2020	Elderbrook	"Back To My Bed"	Production, writing
2020	Keisza	Crave	Production, writing ("Crave")
2020	JP Cooper	"Little Bit Of Love"	Production, writing
2020	BTS	Map of the Soul: 7	Production, writing ("We are Bulletproof : the Eternal")
2019	Ina Wroldsen	"Forgive Or Forget"	Writing
2019	JP Cooper ft. Astrid S	"Sing It With Me"	Production, writing
2019	Don Diablo ft. Jessie J	"Brave"	Writing
2019	Dynoro & Ina Wroldsen	"Obsessed"	Production, writing
2019	LÉON	LÉON	Production, writing ("Falliing," "You and I," "Lost Time," "Hope Is A Heartache," "What You Said," "Pink,")
2018	Little Mix	LM5	Production, writing ("Forget You Not")
2018	Dan Caplen	"Hosanna"	Production, writing
2018	Matrix & Futurebound ft. Calum Scott	"Light Us Up"	Writing
2018	PrettyMuch	PRETTYMUCH an EP	Production, writing ("On My Way")
2018	Ina Wroldsen	Hex EP	Production, writing ("Mother," "Mine")
2018	Jess Glynne	Always In Between	Production, writing ("I'll Be There)
2017	Jonas Blue	Blue	Writing ("We Could Go Back ft. Moelogo")
2017	Little Mix	Glory Days (Platinum Edition)	Production, writing ("Is Your Love Enough?")
2017	Fifth Harmony	Fifth Harmony	Production, writing ("Don't Say You Love Me")
2017	Machine Gun Kelly ft. Hailee Steinfeld	"At My Best"	Production, writing
2016	Olly Murs	24 Hrs	Production, writing ("Love You More")
2016	Little Mix	Glory Days	Production, writing ("Shout Out to My Ex," "No More Sad Songs" ft. Machine Gun Kelly, "Beep Beep")
2016	M.O	"Not in Love"	Production, writing
2016	Alizzz	"Your Love" ft. Max Marshall	Writing
2015	Cheryl Cole	Only Human	Production, writing ("Live Life Now," "All in One Night")
2015	Take That	III	Writing ("Let in the Sun")
2015	Little Mix	Get Weird	Production, writing ("Black Magic," "Hair" ft. Sean Paul, "Grown," "Weird People")
2015	Fleur East	Love, Sax and Flashbacks	Production, writing ("Sax," "More and More," "Paris")
2015	Orla Gartland	Lonely People	Writing
2014	Max Marshall	"Your Love is Like" (2014 version)	Production, writing
2014	OWS ft. Pusha T	"Waterline"	Production, writing
2013	Orla Gartland	Roots	Production, writing ("Clueless")
2013	Max Marshall	Forgive Me mixtape	Production, writing ("Forgive Me," "Yesterday")
2013	Max Marshall	"Don't Trip"	Production, writing
2013	The Wanted	Word of Mouth	Production, writing ("Walks Like Rihanna," "In the Middle")
2013	Tyler James	A Place I Go	Production, writing ("I Don’t Give A Damn," "Heart Shaped Hole," "Just For Always," "Written In Stone")
2013	Little Mix	Salute	Production, writing ("Towers")
2012	A*M*E	"Play the Game Boy"	Production, writing
2012	Ronan Keating	Fires	Production, writing ("Fires," "Wasted Light," "I’ve Got You" - prod only, "Love You And Leave You," "Easy Now My Dear" - prod only, "Oxygen")
2012	Cheryl Cole	A Million Lights	Production, writing ("One Thousand")
2012	Tyler James	"Single Tear"	Production
