= Andreas Nordebäck =

Swedish figure skater (born 2004)

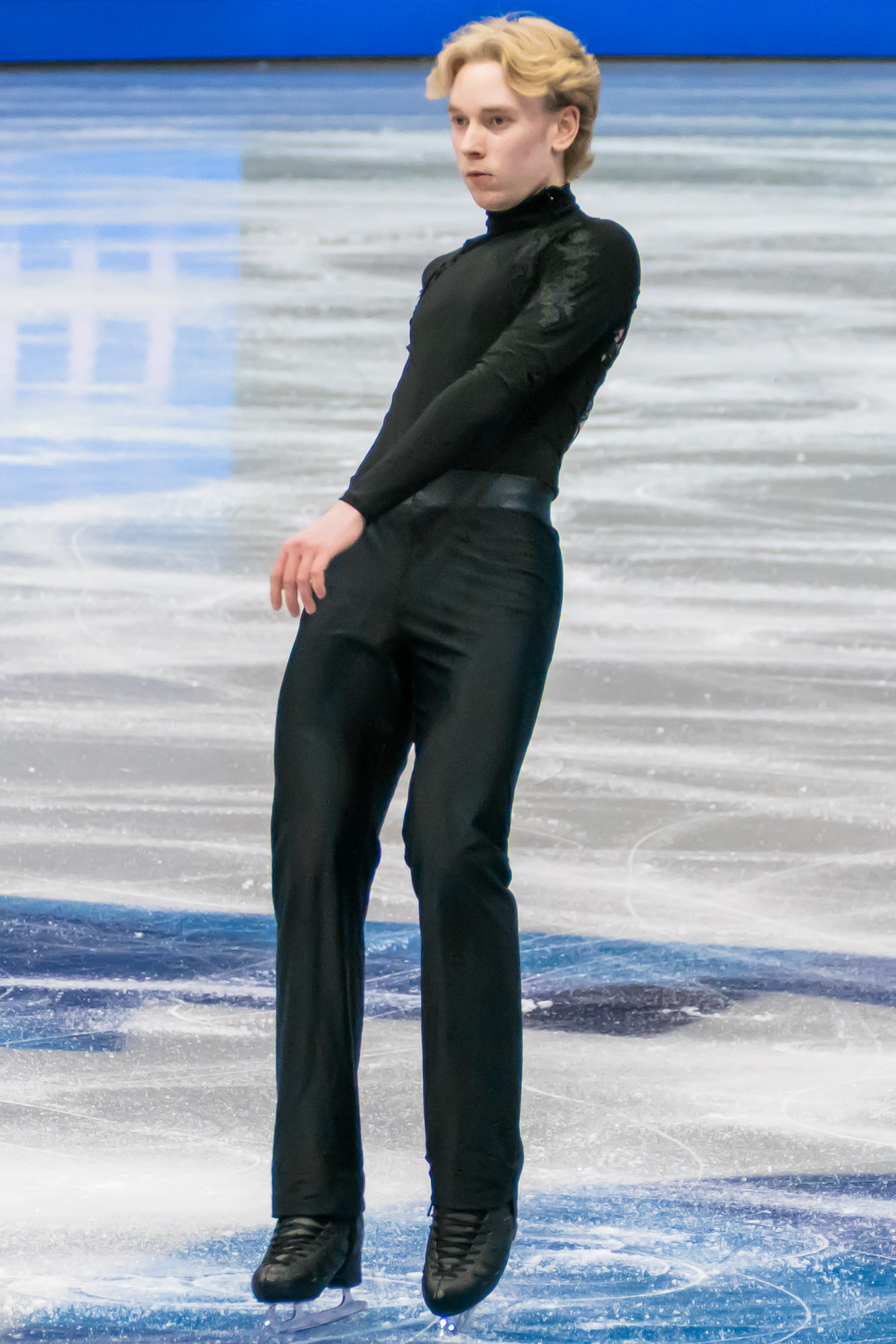
- Andreas Nordebäck at the 2025 World Championships

Personal information
- Born: 12 March 2004 (age 22) Stockholm, Sweden
- Height: 1.75 m (5 ft 9 in)

Figure skating career
- Country: Sweden
- Discipline: Men's singles
- Coach: Kevin Jasko; Tatiana Magnusson
- Skating club: Skating and Dance Academy (Stockholm)
- Began skating: 2007

Medal record
Swedish Championships
| Gold medal – first place | 2023 Borås | Singles |
| Gold medal – first place | 2026 Landskrona | Singles |
| Silver medal – second place | 2025 Västerås | Singles |

Andreas Nordebäck (born 12 March 2004) is a Swedish figure skater. He is a two time Swedish national champion (2023, 2026), the 2026 Finlandia Trophy silver medalist, the 2022 CS Ice Challenge silver medalist, and the 2022 CS Finlandia Trophy bronze medalist.

He became the first male skater representing Sweden to win a senior ISU Grand Prix medal.

On the junior level, Nordebäck is the 2022 JGP Czech Republic bronze medalist, a two-time Swedish junior national champion (2019-20), and finished in the top 10 at the 2022 World Junior Figure Skating Championships.

Nordebäck represented Sweden at the 2026 Winter Olympics.

== Personal life ==
Nordebäck was born on 12 March 2004 in Solna, Sweden, a municipality of Stockholm.

== Career ==
=== Early career ===
Nordebäck began figure skating in 2007. During his early career, he was coached by Tanja Magnusson and Daniel Peinado, before eventually switching to Danil Efintsev.

=== 2017–18 season: Junior debut ===
Making his junior international debut, Nordebäck began the season by competing at the 2017 Volvo Open Cup, where he placed fifth. He went on to compete at the 2017 CS Tallinn Trophy, finishing sixth.

At the 2018 Swedish Junior Championships, Nordebäck won the bronze medal. He then won the gold medal at the 2018 Nordic Junior Championships. He closed the season with fourth-place finish at the 2018 International Challenge Cup.

=== 2018–19 season ===
Debuting on the Junior Grand Prix series, Nordebäck finished ninth at both the 2018 JGP Czech Republic and 2018 JGP Slovenia. He then won the silver medal at the 2018 Golden Bear of Zagreb.

At the 2019 Swedish Junior Championships, Nordebäck won the gold medal. Competing at the 2019 European Youth Olympic Festival, he finished fifth.

Following the season, Nordebäck switched coaches from Danil Efintsev to Mélanie Joseph.

=== 2019–20 season ===
Nordebäck competed on the Junior Grand Prix series, finishing fourteenth at the 2019 JGP Poland and fifteenth at the 2019 JGP Italy.

At the 2020 Swedish Junior Championships, Nordebäck won the junior national title for the second year in a row. He then competed at the 2020 Bavarian Open, where he placed seventh.

=== 2020–21 season ===
Nordebäck did not compete during this season. He performed in the Exhibition Gala at the 2021 World Championships in Stockholm, Sweden.

=== 2021–22 season ===
Competing on the Junior Grand Prix series, Nordebäck placed ninth at the 2021 JGP Russia and fifth at the 2021 JGP Austria. He then went on to win the gold medal at the 2021 Tallinn Trophy and at the 2022 Nordic Championships.

Selected to compete at the 2022 World Junior Championships in Tallinn, Estonia, Nordebäck finished tenth.

=== 2022–23 season: Senior debut, first national title ===
Nordebäck began the season by competing on the Junior Grand Prix series, winning the bronze medal at the 2022 JGP Czech Republic and seventh at the 2022 JGP Italy. Making his senior international debut, Nordebäck won the bronze medal at the 2022 CS Finlandia Trophy and silver medal at the 2022 CS Ice Challenge.

At the 2023 Swedish Championships, Nordebäck won his first senior national title. He also went on to win gold at the 2023 Nordic Championships.

Selected to compete at the 2023 European Championships in Espoo, Finland, Nordebäck finished ninth. He then went on to compete at the 2023 World Junior Championships in Calgary, Alberta, and placed eleventh.

Making his World Championship debut at the 2023 World Championships in Saitama, Japan, Nordebäck finished eighteenth.

=== 2023–24 season ===
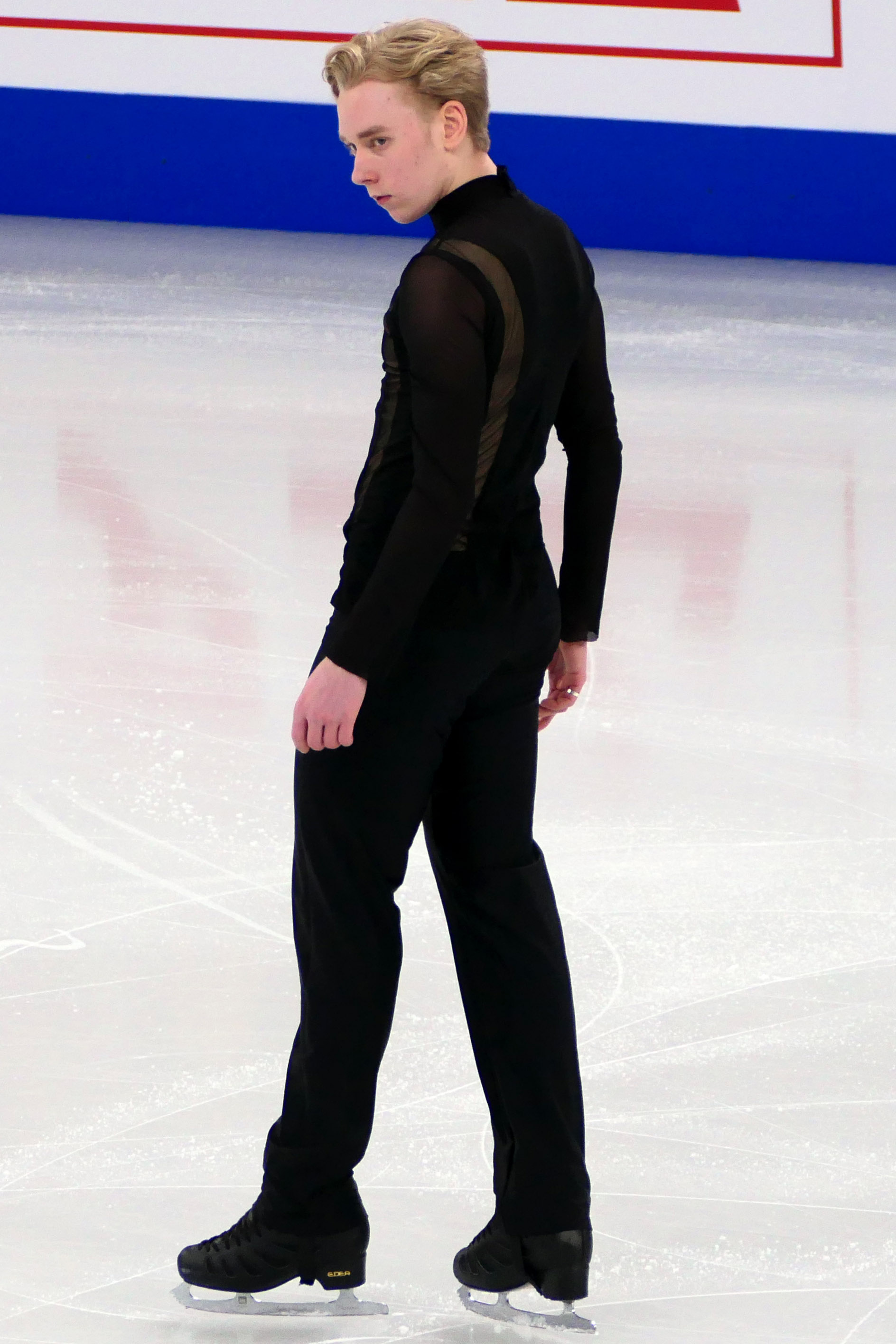
Nordebäck at the 2024 World Championships

Nordebäck began the season with an eleventh-place finish at the 2023 CS Finlandia Trophy. On the Grand Prix, he was twelfth of twelve skaters at the 2023 Skate America. In the second half of the season Nordebäck came twenty-second at the 2024 European Championships and twenty-third at the 2024 World Championships. Between the two events, Nordebäck won the 2024 Nordic Championships for a second consecutive time.

=== 2024–25 season ===
Nordebäck started the season by competing on the 2024–25 ISU Challenger Series, finishing fourth at the 2024 CS Trophée Métropole Nice Côte d'Azur and eighth at the 2024 CS Tallinn Trophy. In December, he competed at the 2025 Swedish Championships, finishing second to Casper Johansson.

Going on to compete at the 2025 European Championships in Tallinn, Estonia, Nordebäck finished the event in eleventh place overall. He then competed at the Road to 26 Trophy, a test event for the 2026 Winter Olympics, where he placed sixth.

In March, Nordebäck competed at the 2025 World Championships in Boston, Massachusetts, United States, where he finished in seventeenth place. His placement won Sweden a quota for men's singles skating at the 2026 Winter Olympics.

=== 2025–26 season: Milano Cortina Olympics and second national title ===
Nordebäck opened his season by competing on the 2025–26 ISU Challenger Series, placing seventh at the 2025 CS Lombardia Trophy and twelfth at the 2025 CS Denis Ten Memorial Challenge. He subsequently competed at the 2025 Finlandia Trophy, where he finished in ninth place.

In December, Nordebäck won his second national title at the 2026 Swedish Championships. The following month, he finished in twelfth place at the 2026 European Championships in Sheffield, England, United Kingdom.

On 10 February, Nordebäck competed in the short program segment at the 2026 Winter Olympics, placing twenty-seventh. He did not advance to the free skate segment. Two weeks later, Nordebäck won the gold medal at the 2026 Maria Olszewska Memorial.

In March, Nordebäck completed his season at the 2026 World Championships. He placed twenty-fourth in the short program and fifteenth in the free skate, finishing seventeenth overall.

=== 2026–27 season ===
Nordebäck began the new season at the 2026 CS Nepela Memorial where he placed ninth overall.

In November, he competed at 2026 Finlandia Trophy placing third in the short program and free skate, finishing second overall. In doing so, he became the first man from Sweden to medal at a Grand Prix. “All my life, I’ve dreamed of winning just one medal at a major competition, whether it’s a Grand Prix, Europeans or Worlds,” Nordeback added. “It always felt out of reach, even if I skated my best. And now it’s actually happened. I’m speechless.”

== Programs ==
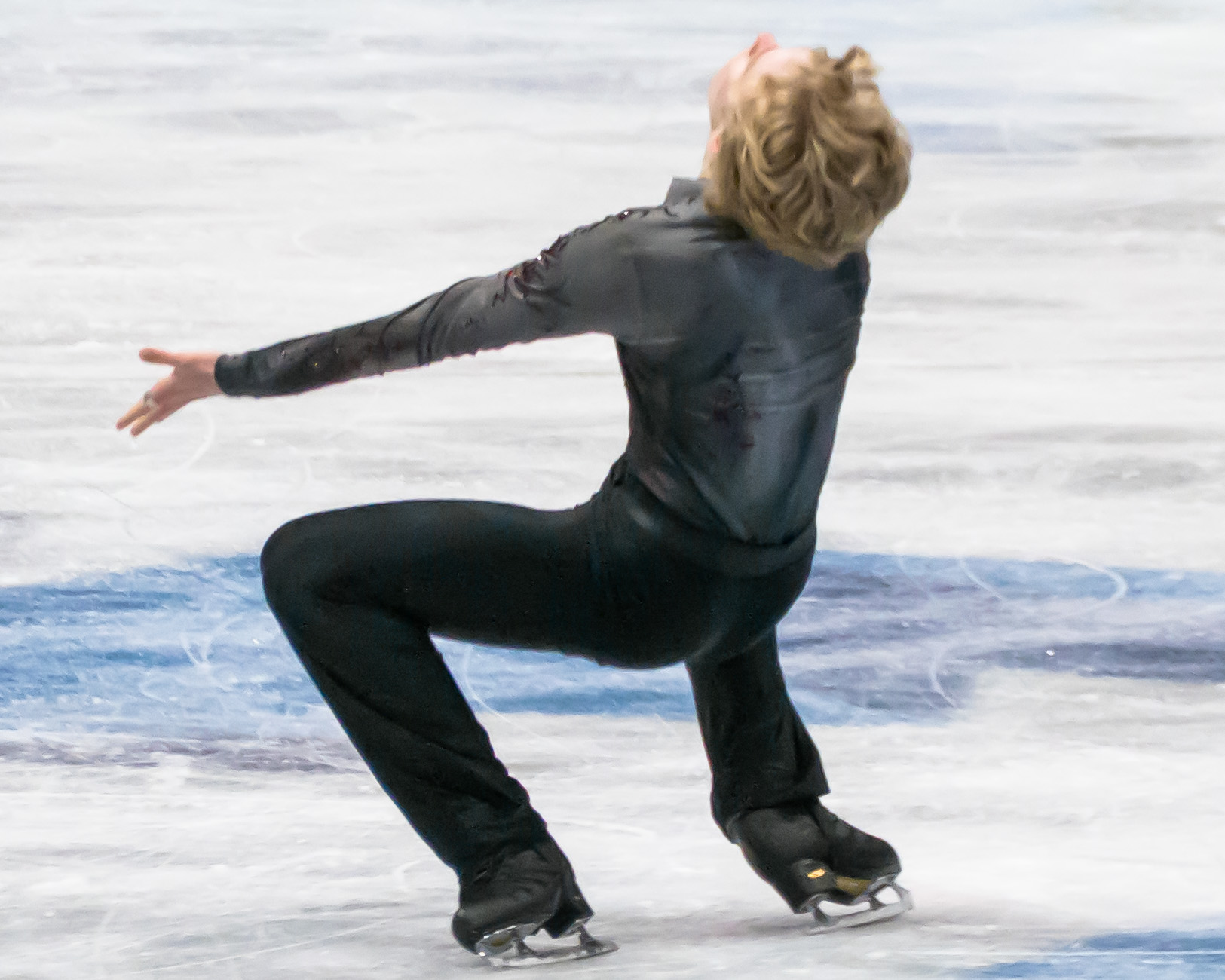
Nordebäck performing a cantilever at the 2025 World Championships

| Season | Short program | Free skating | Exhibition |
|---|---|---|---|
| 2017–2018 | Beat It; Bad by Michael Jackson choreo. by Romain Gazave | The Mask This Business of Love by Domino; Sing, Sing, Sing by Louis Prima choreo. by Romain Gazave | |
| 2018–2019 | Hallelujah by Leonard Cohen performed by Axel Rudi Pell choreo. by Romain Gazave | The Mask This Business of Love by Domino; Sing, Sing, Sing by Louis Prima choreo. by Romain Gazave | |
| 2019–2020 | I'm A Wanted Man by Royal Deluxe choreo. by Romain Gazave | The Untouchables by Ennio Morricone; Sherlock Holmes: A Game of Shadows by Hans Zimmer choreo. by Romain Gazave | |
| 2020–2021 | Did not compete | | Hallelujah by Leonard Cohen performed by Axel Rudi Pell choreo. by Julia Lazdinis, Christina Batian |
| 2021–2022 | Hallelujah | Notre-Dame de Paris by Riccardo Cocciante; Le Temps des Cathédrales performed by Bruno Pelletier; Tu vas me détruire performed by Daniel Lavoie; Danse, Mon Esmeralda performed by Garou choreo. by Julia Lazdinis, Christina Batian | |
| 2022–2023 | Hurt by Nine Inch Nails performed by Johnny Cash choreo. by Benoît Richaud | Notre-Dame de Paris by Riccardo Cocciante; Le Temps des Cathédrales performed by Bruno Pelletier; Tu vas me détruire performed by Daniel Lavoie; Danse, Mon Esmeralda performed by Garou choreo. by Julia Lazdinis, Christina Batian | Come What May (from Moulin Rouge!) by Ewan McGregor and Nicole Kidman |
| 2022–2023 | Hurt by Nine Inch Nails performed by Johnny Cash choreo. by Benoît Richaud | Violin Concerto No. 1 by Philip Glass choreo. by Julia Lazdinis, Christina Batian | Come What May (from Moulin Rouge!) by Ewan McGregor and Nicole Kidman |
| 2023–2024 | Personal Jesus by Depeche Mode choreo. by David Wilson | The Dark Knight Rises by Hans Zimmer choreo. by David Wilson | |
| 2024–2025 | Personal Jesus by Depeche Mode choreo. by David Wilson | How It Ends by Atli Örvarsson choreo. by David Wilson | |
| 2025–2026 | Still Got the Blues (For You) by Gary Moore choreo. by Josh Spicer; Personal Jesus by Depeche Mode choreo. by David Wilson | Un giorno per noi (from Romeo and Juliet) by Henry Mancini performed by Josh Groban choreo. by Nikolai Morozov | |

== Competitive highlights ==
- GP – Event of the ISU Grand Prix Series
- JGP – Event of the ISU Junior Grand Prix Series
- CS – Event of the ISU Challenger Series
- TBD – Assigned
- WD – Withdrew from competition

Competition placements at senior level
| Season | 2022–23 | 2023–24 | 2024–25 | 2025–26 | 2026–27 |
|---|---|---|---|---|---|
| Winter Olympics | | | | 27th | |
| World Championships | 18th | 23rd | 17th | 17th | |
| European Championships | 9th | 22nd | 11th | 12th | |
| Swedish Championships | 1st | | 2nd | 1st | |
| GP Finland | | | | 9th | 2nd |
| GP Skate America | | 12th | | | |
| CS Denis Ten Memorial | | | | 12th | |
| CS Finlandia Trophy | 3rd | 11th | | | |
| CS Ice Challenge | 2nd | | | | |
| CS Ice Challenge | 2nd | | | | |
| CS Lombardia Trophy | | | | 7th | |
| CS Nepela Memorial | | | | | 9th |
| CS Tallinn Trophy | | | 8th | | |
| CS Trophée Métropole Nice | | | 4th | | |
| CS Budapest Trophy | | | | | 8th |
| Nordic Championships | 1st | 1st | | | |
| Road to 26 Trophy | | | 6th | | |
| Maria Olszewska Memorial | | | | 1st | |
| Volvo Open Cup | | | | | 2nd |

Competition placements at junior level
| Season | 2017–18 | 2018–19 | 2019–20 | 2021–22 | 2022–23 |
|---|---|---|---|---|---|
| World Junior Championships | | | | 10th | 11th |
| Swedish Championships | 3rd | 1st | 1st | | |
| JGP Austria | | | | 5th | |
| JGP Czech Republic | | 9th | | | 3rd |
| JGP Italy | | | 15th | | 7th |
| JGP Poland | | | 14th | | |
| JGP Russia | | | | 9th | |
| JGP Slovenia | | 9th | | | |
| Bavarian Open | | | 7th | | |
| Challenge Cup | 4th | | | | |
| European Youth Olympic Festival | | 5th | | | |
| Golden Bear of Zagreb | | 2nd | | | |
| Nordic Championships | 1st | | | 1st | |
| Tallinn Trophy | 6th | | | 1st | |
| Volvo Open Cup | 5th | | | | |

== Detailed results ==
ISU personal best scores in the +5/-5 GOE System
| Segment | Type | Score | Event |
|---|---|---|---|
| Total | TSS | 230.37 | 2025 CS Lombardia Trophy |
| Short program | TSS | 79.89 | 2024 CS Trophée Métropole Nice Côte d'Azur |
| Short program | TES | 42.75 | 2024 CS Trophée Métropole Nice Côte d'Azur |
| Short program | PCS | 37.93 | 2022 CS Finlandia Trophy |
| Free skating | TSS | 154.92 | 2025 CS Lombardia Trophy |
| Free skating | TES | 78.90 | 2025 CS Lombardia Trophy |
| Free skating | PCS | 76.03 | 2023 World Championships |

=== Senior level ===
Results in the 2022–23 season
| Date | Event | SP | | FS | | Total | |
| Date | Event | P | Score | P | Score | P | Score |
|---|---|---|---|---|---|---|---|
| Nov 9–13, 2023 | (Austria) 2022 CS Ice Challenge | 2 | 75.24 | 4 | 143.01 | 2 | 218.25 |
| Dec 15–18, 2022 | (Sweden) 2023 Swedish Championships | 1 | 83.82 | 2 | 144.37 | 1 | 228.19 |
| Jan 23–29, 2023 | (Finland) 2023 European Championships | 9 | 75.98 | 10 | 136.97 | 9 | 212.95 |
| Feb 2–5, 2023 | (Iceland) 2023 Nordic Championships | 1 | 79.27 | 1 | 146.66 | 1 | 225.93 |
| Mar 22–25, 2023 | (Japan) 2023 World Championships | 20 | 73.45 | 18 | 150.07 | 18 | 223.52 |

Results in the 2023–24 season
| Date | Event | SP | | FS | | Total | |
| Date | Event | P | Score | P | Score | P | Score |
|---|---|---|---|---|---|---|---|
| Oct 4–8, 2023 | (Finland) 2023 CS Finlandia Trophy | 13 | 67.42 | 11 | 123.05 | 11 | 190.47 |
| Oct 20–22, 2023 | (United States) 2023 Skate America | 12 | 66.28 | 12 | 132.67 | 12 | 198.95 |
| Jan 10–14, 2024 | (Lithuania) 2024 European Championships | 8 | 77.62 | 23 | 111.80 | 22 | 189.42 |
| Feb 1–4, 2024 | (Sweden) 2024 Nordic Championships | 1 | 78.01 | 1 | 136.28 | 1 | 214.29 |
| Mar 18–24, 2024 | (Canada) 2024 World Championships | 20 | 76.20 | 23 | 135.25 | 23 | 211.45 |

Results in the 2024–25 season
| Date | Event | SP | | FS | | Total | |
| Date | Event | P | Score | P | Score | P | Score |
|---|---|---|---|---|---|---|---|
| Oct 16–20, 2024 | (France) 2024 CS Trophée Métropole Nice Côte d'Azur | 4 | 79.89 | 3 | 146.61 | 4 | 226.50 |
| Nov 11–17, 2024 | (Estonia) 2024 CS Tallinn Trophy | 5 | 73.63 | 9 | 130.84 | 9 | 204.47 |
| Dec 12-15, 2024 | (Sweden) 2025 Swedish Championships | 1 | 84.00 | 3 | 122.77 | 2 | 206.77 |
| Jan 28 – Feb 2, 2025 | (Estonia) 2025 European Championships | 9 | 79.02 | 9 | 148.09 | 11 | 227.11 |
| Feb 18–20, 2025 | (Italy) 2025 Road to 26 Trophy | 5 | 75.80 | 6 | 138.31 | 6 | 214.11 |
| Mar 24–30, 2025 | (United States) 2025 World Championships | 17 | 79.03 | 16 | 150.82 | 17 | 229.85 |

Results in the 2025–26 season
| Date | Event | SP | | FS | | Total | |
| Date | Event | P | Score | P | Score | P | Score |
|---|---|---|---|---|---|---|---|
| Sep 11–14, 2025 | (Italy) 2025 CS Lombardia Trophy | 10 | 75.35 | 6 | 154.92 | 7 | 230.37 |
| Oct 1–4, 2025 | (Kazakhstan) 2025 CS Denis Ten Memorial Challenge | 14 | 70.11 | 10 | 135.55 | 12 | 205.66 |
| Nov 21–22, 2025 | (Finland) 2025 Finlandia Trophy | 11 | 67.93 | 8 | 144.68 | 9 | 212.61 |
| Dec 12–14, 2025 | (Sweden) 2026 Swedish Championships | 1 | 83.19 | 1 | 158.46 | 1 | 241.65 |
| Jan 13–18, 2026 | (United Kingdom) 2026 European Championships | 12 | 76.78 | 12 | 139.30 | 12 | 216.08 |
| Feb 10–13, 2026 | (Italy) 2026 Winter Olympics | 27 | 67.15 | —N/a | —N/a | 27 | 67.15 |
| Feb 24–28, 2026 | (Poland) 2026 Maria Olszewska Memorial | 2 | 78.93 | 1 | 146.33 | 1 | 225.26 |
| Mar 24–29, 2026 | (Czech Republic) 2026 World Championships | 24 | 72.59 | 15 | 152.07 | 17 | 224.66 |

Results in the 2026-27 season
| Date | Event | SP | | FS | | Total | |
| Date | Event | P | Score | P | Score | P | Score |
|---|---|---|---|---|---|---|---|
| Sep 24–27, 2026 | (Slovakia) 2026 CS Nepela Memorial | 8 | 79.26 | 10 | 137.13 | 9 | 216.39 |
| Oct 15-18, 2026 | (Hungary) 2026 CS Budapest Trophy | 15 | 62.79 | 6 | 145.69 | 8 | 208.48 |
| Nov 4–8, 2026 | (Latvia) 2026 Volvo Open Cup | 2 | 72.12 | 2 | 146.71 | 2 | 218.83 |

=== Junior level ===
2022–23 season
| Date | Event | SP | FS | Total |
| March 22–26, 2023 | 2023 World Championships | 20; 73.45 | 18; 150.07 | 18; 223.52 |
| February 27–March 5, 2023 | 2023 World Junior Championships | 5; 76.82 | 12; 127.90 | 11; 204.32 |
| February 2–5, 2023 | 2023 Nordic Championships | 1; 79.27 | 1; 146.66 | 1; 225.93 |
| January 25–29, 2023 | 2023 European Championships | 9; 75.98 | 10; 136.97 | 9; 212.95 |
| December 15–18, 2022 | 2022–23 Swedish Championships | 1; 83.82 | 2; 144.37 | 1; 228.19 |
| November 9–13, 2022 | 2022 CS Ice Challenge | 2; 75.24 | 4; 143.01 | 2; 218.25 |
| October 12–15, 2022 | 2022 JGP Italy | 9; 62.62 | 4; 127.71 | 7; 190.33 |
| October 4–9, 2022 | 2022 CS Finlandia Trophy | 4; 78.92 | 3; 150.96 | 3; 229.88 |
| August 31–September 3, 2022 | 2022 JGP Czech Republic | 3; 72.01 | 3; 140.36 | 3; 212.37 |
2021–22 season
| Date | Event | SP | FS | Total |
| April 13–17, 2022 | 2022 World Junior Championships | 7; 76.20 | 14; 129.93 | 10; 206.13 |
| January 27–30, 2022 | 2022 Nordic Junior Championships | 1; 65.83 | 1; 130.04 | 1; 195.87 |
| November 16–18, 2021 | 2021 Tallinn Trophy | 1; 65.64 | 1; 130.07 | 1; 195.71 |
| October 6–9, 2021 | 2021 JGP Austria | 5; 62.90 | 4; 134.26 | 5; 197.16 |
| September 15–18, 2021 | 2021 JGP Russia | 10; 60.26 | 9; 120.68 | 9; 180.94 |
2019–20 season
| Date | Event | SP | FS | Total |
| February 3–9, 2020 | 2020 Bavarian Open | 7; 57.72 | 7; 105.36 | 7; 163.08 |
| December 12–15, 2019 | 2019–20 Swedish Junior Championships | 2; 54.89 | 3; 98.83 | 1; 153.72 |
| October 2–5, 2019 | 2019 JGP Italy | 16; 53.66 | 14; 106.95 | 15; 160.61 |
| September 18–21, 2019 | 2019 JGP Poland | 15; 53.92 | 12; 99.97 | 14; 153.89 |
2018–19 season
| Date | Event | SP | FS | Total |
| February 13–14, 2019 | 2019 European Youth Olympic Winter Festival | 5; 56.95 | 3; 114.95 | 5; 171.90 |
| December 12–16, 2018 | 2018–19 Swedish Junior Championships | 1; 61.12 | 1; 116.14 | 1; 177.26 |
| October 25–28, 2018 | 2018 Golden Bear of Zagreb | 2; 60.74 | 2; 103.61 | 2; 164.35 |
| October 3–6, 2018 | 2018 JGP Slovenia | 11; 57.96 | 9; 107.06 | 9; 165.02 |
| September 26–29, 2018 | 2018 JGP Czech Republic | 7; 63.04 | 10; 110.40 | 9; 173.44 |
2017–18 season
| Date | Event | SP | FS | Total |
| February 22–25, 2018 | 2018 International Challenge Cup | 6; 49.54 | 4; 104.05 | 4; 153.59 |
| February 1–4, 2018 | 2018 Nordic Junior Championships | 1; 51.86 | 1; 105.78 | 1; 157.64 |
| December 13–17, 2017 | 2017–18 Swedish Junior Championships | 2; 52.62 | 3; 108.55 | 3; 161.17 |
| November 21–26, 2017 | 2017 Tallinn Trophy | 5; 56.98 | 6; 115.34 | 6; 172.32 |
| November 8–12, 2017 | 2017 Volvo Open Cup | 6; 49.92 | 2; 107.11 | 5; 157.03 |
