= Everybody Needs a Hero (album) =

Studio album by Orla Gartland
- Released: 4 October 2024
- Recorded: 2022–2024
- Studio: Middle Farm; Chateaux Head Chef; OG HQ
- Genre: Alternative pop
- Length: 37:30
- Label: New Friends
- Producer: Orla Gartland; Pete Miles; Tom Stafford; Starsmith

Orla Gartland chronology
Woman on the Internet (2021)	Everybody Needs a Hero (2024)

Singles from Everybody Needs a Hero
- 1. "Kiss Ur Face Forever" Released: 1 August 2023; 2. "Little Chaos" Released: 15 May 2024; 3. "Mine" Released: 18 June 2024; 4. "The Hit" Released: 24 July 2024; 5. "Late to the Party" Released: 27 August 2024

Singles from Everybody Needs a Hero (Extended Edition)
- 1. "Now What?" Released: April 14, 2025

Everybody Needs a Hero is the second studio album by the Irish singer-songwriter and guitarist Orla Gartland, released on 4 October 2024 by New Friends.

== Singles ==
Everybody Needs a Hero was preceded by the release of five singles, "Kiss Ur Face Forever", "Little Chaos", "Mine", "The Hit" and "Late to the Party".

== Track listing ==
Everybody Needs a Hero track listing
No.	Title	Writer(s)	Producer(s)	Length
1.	"Both Can Be True"	Orla Gartland	Gartland; Pete Miles	1:30
2.	"Sound of Letting Go"	Gartland; Pete Robertson	Gartland; Tom Stafford; Miles; Robertson^{[a]}	2:49
3.	"Little Chaos"	Gartland; Miles; Tom Stafford	Gartland; Miles	2:54
4.	"Backseat Driver"	Gartland; Lauren Aquilina; Stafford	Gartland; Stafford	2:55
5.	"The Hit"	Gartland; Aquilina; Stafford	Gartland; Stafford; Miles	3:30
6.	"Simple"	Gartland	Gartland; Stafford	3:31
7.	"Late to the Party" (featuring Declan McKenna)	Gartland; Declan McKenna	Gartland; Stafford; Miles	3:35
8.	"Three Words Away"	Gartland; Fin Dow-Smith	Gartland; Stafford; Miles; Starsmith	3:10
9.	"Kiss Ur Face Forever"	Gartland; Aquilina; Stafford	Gartland; Stafford; Miles	2:47
10.	"Who Am I?"	Gartland; Stafford; Victoria Zaro	Gartland; Stafford	3:08
11.	"Mine"	Gartland	Gartland; Miles; Stafford	3:08
12.	"Everybody Needs a Hero"	Gartland; Stafford	Gartland; Miles; Stafford	4:20
Total length:				37:30

Extended edition
No.	Title	Writer(s)	Producer(s)	Length
13.	"Now What?"	Gartland	Gartland; Miles; Stafford	3:13
14.	"Pest" (featuring Tommy Lefroy)	Gartland; Mouzourakis; Stafford; Bethnal	Gartland; Stafford	3:06
15.	"One Eye Open"	Gartland	Gartland; Miles; Stafford	3:09
16.	"Thirty"	Gartland	Gartland	3:05
17.	"Mine (Stripped)"	Gartland; Stafford	Gartland; Miles	3:15
Total length:				53:14

== Personnel ==
=== Musicians ===
- Orla Gartland – vocals (all tracks), piano (track 1), electric guitar (2–4, 6–12), synthesizer (2, 3), bass (3, 5), acoustic guitar (5), drums (7)
- Tom Stafford – synthesizer (tracks 2, 4, 5, 8, 9, 12), electric guitar (3–5, 7–9, 12), programming (3, 5–8, 10–12), drums (4, 6); modular synthesizer, bass (4, 7); backing vocals (4, 8), string arrangement (11)
- Pete Miles – percussion (tracks 2, 8), programming (3, 5, 7–9, 12), bass (6, 8, 9, 12)
- Nathan Cox – electric guitar (tracks 6, 9, 12), bass (8, 10), synthesizer (10)
- Mat Swales – drums (tracks 2, 3, 8, 10, 12)
- Tim Langsford – drums (tracks 5, 7–9)
- Lauren Aquilina – backing vocals (tracks 4, 5, 9)
- Isambard Warburton – drums (track 8)
- Soren Bryce – synthesizer, backing vocals (track 9)
- Grace Lightman – backing vocals (track 9)
- Declan McKenna – electric guitar, vocals (track 7)
- Will Harvey – violin (track 11)
- Guy Button – violin (track 11)
- Francesca Gilbert – viola (track 11)
- Maddie Cutter – cello (track 11)
- Dan Hillman – saxophone (track 8)

=== Technical ===
- Christian Wright – mastering
- Orla Gartland – mixing (tracks 1, 6, 11)
- Pete Miles – mixing (tracks 1, 6, 11)
- Geoff Swan – mixing (tracks 2–5, 7–10, 12)
- Tom Stafford – mixing (track 11)

=== Visuals ===
- Flower Up – creative direction, vinyl packaging design
- Greta Isaac – creative direction, art direction
- Nicole Ngai – photography
- Orla Gartland – liner notes

== Charts ==
Chart performance
Chart	Peak position
Irish Albums (IRMA)	8
UK Albums (OCC)	43
