= Roots (EP) =

EP by Orla Gartland
- Released: 11 November 2013
- Genres: indie pop, indie folk
- Length: 14:05
- Label: Independent

Orla Gartland chronology
Roots (2013)	Lonely People (2015)

The EP Roots was released by Orla Gartland on 11 November 2013. All songs on the album were performed by Orla Gartland. Prior to the album release, the title track "Roots" and the song "Clueless" were released as music videos.

== Reception ==
The Irish Independent interviewed Gartland upon the release and reported that she "...just released her debut EP Roots which climbed to the number one slot during the first week of release on iTunes." UK based Fortitude Magazine wrote "Within its first day 'Roots' has already hit the No.1 spot in the UK and Ireland singer/songwriter charts and No.3 in Ireland's main chart." On 24 November, the Irish Mirror featured Gartland in a full-page article and stated "last Tuesday on iTunes her debut EP, Roots, hit No1 in the main Irish albums chart, 15 in the main UK albums chart and No2 in the US singer/songwriter chart."

The title track "Roots" was named Apple iTunes "Single of the Week" in the UK and Ireland in November 2013.

Reviewers praised the quality of the composition of the songs on Roots, calling the lyrics "mature" and the music "surprisingly diverse for a four-track EP".

On 20 November 2013, Gartland was invited to interview and perform on The Ian Dempsey Breakfast Show broadcast nationally in Ireland on Today FM.

== Track listing ==
No.	Title	Length
1.	"Roots"	3:56
2.	"Clueless"	3:10
3.	"Human"	3:43
4.	"Empty Man"	3:16

== Music videos ==
Two tracks, "Roots" and "Clueless" were made into a sequence of partially animated music videos directed by Yousef Thami with animation by artist Prosper Unger-Hamilton. Tom Clarke filmed a studio session recording of "Roots" which was released as a music video on 13 October 2013 and a studio session of "Human" which was released as a music video on 20 October 2013. On 8 December 2013, Gartland released a lyric video of the track "Human".

== Tour ==
Gartland toured in support of the album in February 2014, visiting ten cities in Ireland and in the United Kingdom.

The tour was managed by Matthew Montgomery-Taylor who was Gartland's "TM" for her three previous tours at the time.
