= Woman on the Internet =

Studio album by Orla Gartland
- Released: 20 August 2021
- Studios: Middle Farm Studios (South Devon, England)
- Genre: Indie pop
- Length: 38:30
- Label: New Friends
- Producers: Orla Gartland; Tom Stafford; Pete Robertson

Orla Gartland chronology
Woman on the Internet (2021)	Everybody Needs a Hero (2024)

Singles from Woman on the Internet
- 1. "Pretending" Released: 16 October 2020; 2. "More Like You" Released: 13 January 2021; 3. "Zombie!" Released: 13 April 2021

Professional ratings
Review scores
Source	Rating
The Guardian	4/5 stars
DIY	4/5 stars
GoldenPlec	4/5 stars
NME	3/5 stars
Slant Magazine	3/5 stars
The Irish Times	3/5 stars
The Line of Best Fit	8/10 stars
The Quietus	(positive)

Woman on the Internet is the debut studio album by the Irish singer-songwriter and guitarist Orla Gartland, released on 20 August 2021 by New Friends.

== Background ==
On 16 October 2020, Gartland released a single called "Pretending". The song discusses the difficulty and trouble of pretending to be the person someone else wants, in order to be a "people pleaser". This was the first single to be released from Woman on the Internet. The second single, "More Like You", was released on 13 January 2021. According to Gartland herself, the song deals with identity, jealousy, and the desire to have the life of someone who seems to have everything easy. The third single, "Zombie!", was released on 13 April 2021. It deals with the topic of toxic masculinity and with Gartland entreating another individual to open up about their emotions and stop repressing their true feelings. The song was produced alongside Pete Robertson, a producer for Beabadoobee and the Vaccines.

== Track listing ==
No.	Title	Length
1.	"Things That I've Learned"	2:33
2.	"You're Not Special, Babe"	3:22
3.	"More Like You"	3:39
4.	"Over Your Head"	3:12
5.	"Zombie!"	2:56
6.	"Madison"	3:44
7.	"Do You Mind?"	3:57
8.	"Codependency"	3:11
9.	"Pretending"	3:36
10.	"Left Behind"	4:14
11.	"Bloodline/Difficult Things"	4:21
Total length:		38:30

== Charts ==
Chart performance
Chart	Peak position
Irish Albums (IRMA)	3
UK Albums (Official Charts)	10
