= Fires (song) =

Single by Ronan Keating

from the album Fires
- Released: August 17, 2012
- Genre: Pop
- Length: 3:51
- Label: Polydor
- Songwriters: Edvard Førre Erfjord, Henrik Barman Michelsen, Shelly Poole
- Producer: Electric

Ronan Keating singles chronology
"What the World Needs Now" (2011)	"Fires" (2012)	"Wasted Light" (2012)

Music video
- Fires on YouTube

"Fires" is the lead single released from Irish singer/songwriter Ronan Keating's ninth solo album with the same name. The song was premiered on 21 July 2012 on BBC Radio 2. The single as released as a digital download on 2 September 2012. The song was only available as a digital download and sold 10,000 copies.

== Music video ==
The music video for the song premiered on 1 August 2012, via YouTube. It shows two versions of the singer running and driving to the same location.

== Track listing ==
Digital download
No.	Title	Length
1.	"Fires"	3:50

== Chart performance ==
Chart (2012)	Peak position
Australia (ARIA)	64
Ireland (IRMA)	90
UK Singles (OCC)	76
UK Airplay (Music Week)	30
