= Orla Gartland =

Irish singer, songwriter, musician

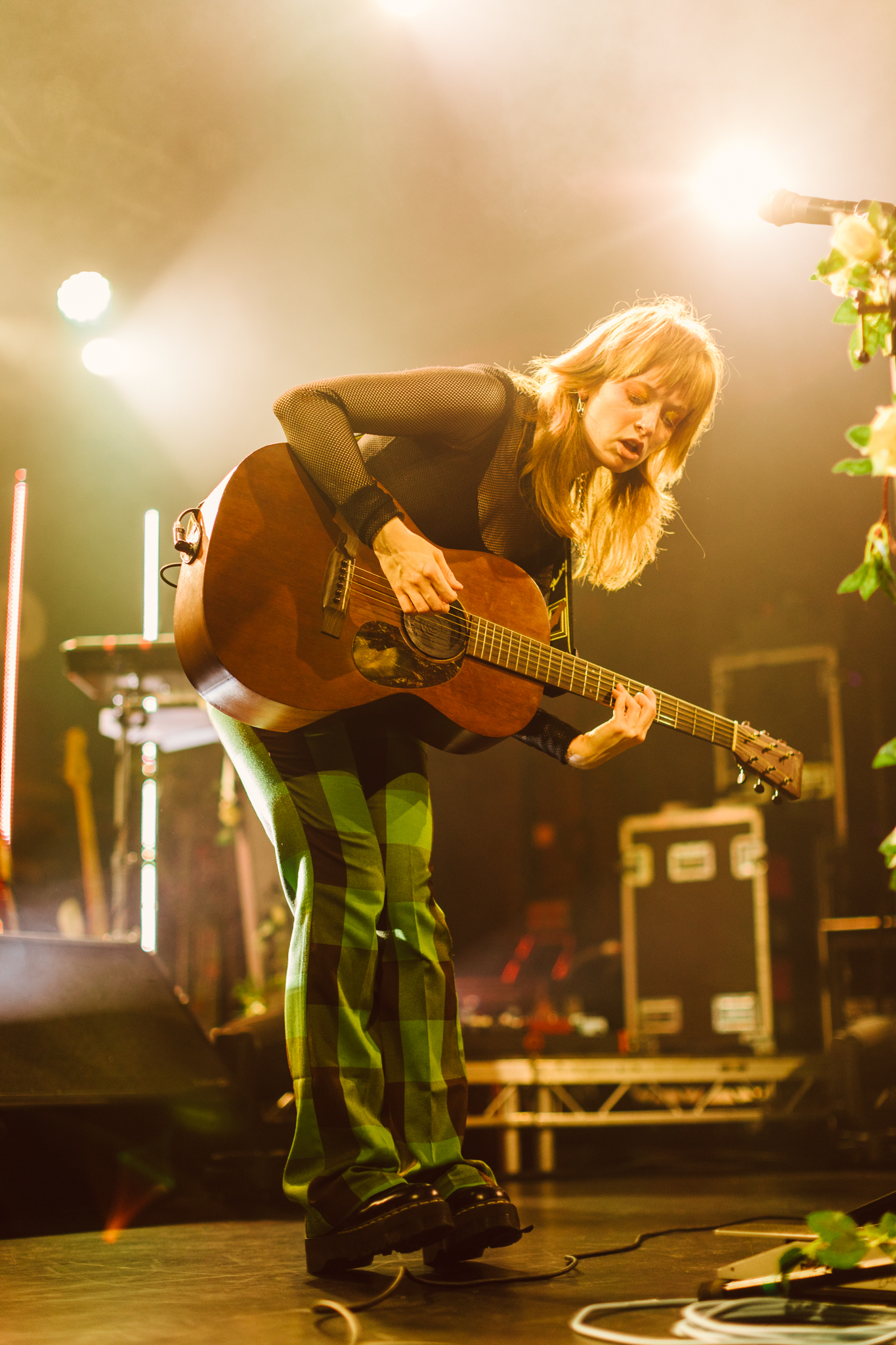
- Gartland performing in 2022

Background information
- Born: Orla Joan Gartland; 3 February 1995 (age 31); Dublin, Ireland
- Genres: Acoustic; folk; indie pop; indie folk; pop rock
- Occupations: Musician; singer-songwriter
- Instruments: Vocals; guitar; ukulele; piano
- Years active: 2007–present
- Label: New Friends
- Member of: Fizz
- Website: orlagartland.com

Orla Joan Gartland (born 3 February 1995) is an Irish singer, songwriter and musician. Gartland released her debut studio album, Woman on the Internet, in 2021, which reached number 3 on the Irish album chart, number 1 on the UK Indie Chart, and number 10 on the UK Albums Chart. Her second studio album Everybody Needs a Hero came out in October 2024.

Additionally, she has released five extended plays (EPs): Freckle Season (2020), Why Am I Like This? (2019), Lonely People (2015), Roots (2013), and Laughing at My Own Jokes (2012).

== Early life and education ==
Gartland grew up in Drumcondra, Northside, Dublin near Croke Park. She has a younger sister and a younger brother. In an interview with Campus.ie, Gartland stated "I played violin, fiddle, and trad and Irish stuff from the age of about five years old...my parents got me into lessons and the guitar at about 12 years old and it went from there." She nearly went to BIMM University, but deferred her application and moved to London in 2015, as she knew many UK-based musicians through YouTube.

== Career ==
=== 2009–2012: Early music ===
In 2009, Gartland launched her YouTube channel under the name "MusicMaaad." She posted her first YouTube video at age 13, about which she stated "I had been playing guitar for just over a year and wailing alongside the chords. I hadn't a clue how to sing; the breathing or any of the technical stuff (still haven't the foggiest) – so just wanted some feedback on that really!". She posted covers and then started posting originals. The first original she posted was titled "Green Eyed Monster." Gartland also spent time busking on the streets of Dublin as a teen, through which she befriended the folk and Americana duo Hudson Taylor.

In 2012, Gartland opened for Britain's Got Talent contestant Ryan O'Shaughnessy at The Academy and for Scottish singer-songwriter Nina Nesbitt at Bewley's Cafe Theatre. She released her debut single "Devil on my Shoulder" on 17 June on iTunes, where it reached No. 2 on the Ireland singer-songwriter chart. The single was launched at a sold-out show headlined by Gartland at The Academy in Dublin.

=== 2013–2015: Roots and Lonely People ===
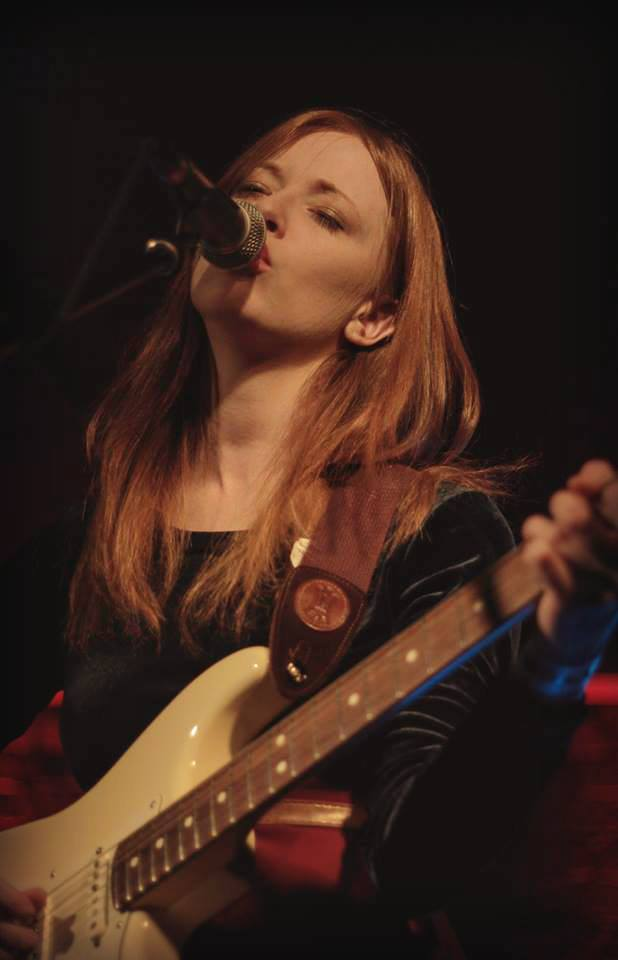
Gartland performing live at The Cookie Jar in Leicester, 2013.

In March 2013, Gartland announced her first tour, headlining five shows in the UK and in Ireland during July 2013.

On 11 November 2013, Gartland released her four-song EP Roots on iTunes. The titular track "Roots" was named Apple iTunes "Single of the Week" in the UK and Ireland. She toured in support of the album in February 2014 visiting ten cities in Ireland and in the United Kingdom.

The Irish Independent selected Gartland as one of "Ireland's most influential teens." GoldenPlec selected Gartland as their "Plec Pick" of 2014, chosen as one of the best solo artists in Ireland.

Gartland's second EP, Lonely People, debuted in 2015 and was described by Atwood Magazine as an "undeniable triumph" that "captivates" by combining funk and alt-pop.

=== 2018–2020: Why Am I Like This? and Freckle Season ===
On 2 May 2018, Gartland released her first single in three years, "I Go Crazy", and on 2 November 2018 she released a new single "Between My Teeth", which she announced were both standalone singles. On 8 February 2019, she released a new single "Why Am I Like This?", followed by "Flatline" on 5 April 2019, both of which formed a part of her EP Why Am I Like This?, released on 24 May 2019. "Why Am I Like This?" was featured in an episode of the 2022 Netflix adaptation of Heartstopper, which resulted in the song reaching the No. 4 spot in the Billboard Top TV Songs chart, three years after the song's initial release.

On 6 September 2019, Gartland released the single "Did It to Myself", followed by "Figure It Out" on 1 November 2019, and "Heavy" on 15 January 2020, all of which appear on her EP Freckle Season. She toured to promote the EP with bassist Pete Daynes and drummer Sarah Stix. "Figure It Out" was described as being about a relationship between individuals where neither can escape from it and the idea of needing space from someone you still care about. "Heavy" featured in the BBC Three trailer for the 2020 adaptation of Normal People, with "Did It to Myself" featuring directly in the miniseries.

Gartland also released her third and fourth EPs, Why Am I Like This? and Freckle Season respectively on vinyl in 2020 with the collective title of Why Is Freckle Season Like This?. The vinyl included the tracklist of both EPs, in addition with an unreleased song, "Don't Fall in Love with a Musician", and an acoustic version of "Figure It Out".

=== 2020–2023: Woman on the Internet ===
On 16 October 2020, Gartland released a single called "Pretending". The song discusses the difficulty and trouble of pretending to be the person someone else wants, in order to be a "people pleaser". The second single, "More Like You", was released on 13 January 2021. According to Gartland herself, the song deals with identity, jealousy, and the desire to have the life of someone who seems to have everything easy. The third single, "Zombie!", was released on 13 April 2021. It deals with the topic of toxic masculinity and with Gartland entreating another individual to open up about their emotions and stop repressing their true feelings. The song was produced alongside Pete Robertson, a producer for Beabadoobee and the Vaccines.

These singles led to her debut studio album Woman on the Internet, which was released independently through her label New Friends on 20 August 2021. The album was co-produced by Gartland and long-term collaborator Tom Stafford, and was recorded at Middle Farm Studios in Devon. For the first time, Gartland had her live band involved in the recording process, instead of being completely self-reliant. Musician and songwriter Nathan Cox was also an additional member on the recording sessions. Conceptually, Gartland created a fictional character for the album, describing the 'woman on the internet' as "a modern-day wizard-of-oz". Gartland has also credited her friend Greta Isaac as her creative director, who was involved in the conceptualizing of the album's visuals and music videos.

Gartland's debut album received a weighted average score of 75 on Metacritc based on 9 critic reviews. It reached number 3 on the Irish album chart, number 1 on the UK Indie Chart, and number 10 on the UK album chart. In 2022, Gartland released an Anniversary Edition of Woman on the Internet, featuring two live tracks and a remix version of "Over Your Head" by Sasami.

=== 2023–present: Everybody Needs a Hero ===
On 1 August 2023, Gartland released a brand new single, "Kiss Ur Face Forever", co-written by her best friend and songwriter Lauren Aquilina. This was her first solo release since 2021. On 15 May 2024, Gartland released another new single called "Little Chaos", and was accompanied with a music video directed by Anne-Sofie Lindgaard. Alongside a collaborative song "Late to the Party" with Declan McKenna, Gartland revealed the tracklist of her sophomore album Everybody Needs a Hero. The album was released in October 2024.

On 9 June 2026, Gartland announced that she would be the soundtrack artist of the 5th season of the Apple TV show, Trying. This was announced via Instagram post containing the trailer for this show. On the same day, her single "At The End Of The Day", which also appeared in the trailer, was released worldwide.

== Collaborations ==
=== 2023–2024: Fizz ===
In 2023, Gartland formed the band Fizz (stylised as FIZZ) with Dodie, Greta Isaac, and Martin Luke Brown. Their debut single, "High in Brighton", came out in June 2023. Their debut studio album, The Secret to Life, was released on 27 October 2023. They announced an official hiatus in July 2024.

=== Appearances ===
Gartland contributed the song "Cast Your Stone" on the album Simple Things, a compilation album released on 15 November 2013 by Niall Breslin in support of suicide prevention in Ireland. She participated in a group performance of the compilations' musicians on The Saturday Night Show.

Gartland, along with Greta Isaac, performed the song "Have Yourself a Merry Little Christmas" which they contributed to the compilation album It's Coming on Christmas. The album raised funds for the breast cancer charity, CoppaFeel!. Gartland has played alongside Dodie in all three of her EP release tours, and was a supporting act in Dodie's 2019 'Human' tour.

She was a co-writer of K-pop boy band BTS's song "134340", from their sixth studio album Love Yourself: Tear (2018).

In 2020, Gartland was part of an Irish collective of female musicians called Irish Women in Harmony that recorded a cover version of the Cranberries' "Dreams" in aid of the charity Safe Ireland, which deals with domestic violence which had reportedly risen significantly during the COVID-19 lockdown.

In December 2022, Gartland featured on Half Alive's song "Never Been Better".

== Musical style and influences ==
Gartland has recalled listening to the likes of Avril Lavigne, Brandi Carlile, Katie Melua, Van Morrison, and the English band Busted, as she was growing up. In 2013–14, she described her music as folk pop, and was most heavily influenced by Joni Mitchell, Regina Spektor, and Imogen Heap. She had also cited Kate Bush, Fleetwood Mac, Cyndi Lauper, and Greg Holden as influences. The Irish Times called Gartland a "pop rock purveyor."

Gartland has stated that the main themes of her 2021 debut studio album were about growing up, feeling lost, comparison and identity issues. The album's musical influences included Laurie Anderson, Fiona Apple, and the Cranberries.

== Personal life ==
In June 2021, Gartland publicly came out as bisexual on Twitter. As of 2020, Gartland was a regular volunteer at Ealing Soup Kitchen in London. As of 2021, she shared a flat with fellow musician Lauren Aquilina.

== Discography ==
=== Studio albums ===
List of solo studio albums
Title	Details	Peak chart positions	
Title	Details	IRL	UK
Woman on the Internet	Released: 20 August 2021; Label: New Friends; Formats: CD, vinyl, cassette, digital download	3	10
Everybody Needs a Hero	Released: 4 October 2024; Label: New Friends; Formats: CD, vinyl, cassette, digital download	8	43

=== Soundtrack albums ===
Title	Album details
Trying: Season 5 (Apple Original Series Soundtrack)	Released: 8 July 2026; Label: New Friends; Formats: Digital download

=== EPs ===
Title	EP details
Laughing at My Own Jokes	Released: 23 August 2011; Label: None; Formats: Digital download
Roots	Released: 11 November 2013; Label: Independent; Formats: CD, digital download
Lonely People	Released: 18 January 2015; Label: Independent; Formats: CD, digital download
Why Am I Like This?	Released: 24 May 2019; Label: Independent; Formats: CD, vinyl, digital download
Freckle Season	Released: 21 February 2020; Label: Independent; Formats: CD, vinyl, digital download

=== Singles ===
Year	Title	Peak chart positions	Album
Year	Title	IRL	Album
2012	"Devil on My Shoulder"	83	Non-album single
2013	"Roots"	30	Roots
2013	"Cast Your Stone"	—	Simple Things
2014	"Have Yourself a Merry Little Christmas"	—	It's Coming on Christmas
2018	"I Go Crazy"	—	Non-album singles
2018	"Between My Teeth"	—	Non-album singles
2019	"Why Am I Like This?"	94	Why Am I Like This?
2019	"Flatline"	—	Why Am I Like This?
2019	"Did It to Myself"	—	Freckle Season
2019	"Figure It Out"	—	Freckle Season
2020	"Heavy"	—	Freckle Season
2020	"Pretending"	—	Woman on the Internet
2021	"More Like You"	—	Woman on the Internet
2021	"Zombie!"	—	Woman on the Internet
2021	"Do You Mind?"	—	Woman on the Internet
2021	"You're Not Special, Babe"	—	Woman on the Internet
2023	"Kiss Ur Face Forever"	—	Everybody Needs A Hero
2024	"Little Chaos"	—	Everybody Needs A Hero
2024	"Mine"	—	Everybody Needs A Hero
2024	"The Hit"	—	Everybody Needs A Hero
2024	"Late to the Party" (featuring Declan McKenna)	—	Everybody Needs A Hero
2025	"Now What?"	—	Everybody Needs A Hero (Extended Edition)
2026	"At the End of the Day"	—	Trying: Season 5 (Apple Original Series Soundtrack)

=== Music videos ===
Year	Title	Album	Director
2011	"All the Little Details"	Laughing at My Own Jokes	The Podsmiths
2012	"Devil on My Shoulder"	Non-album single	Tom Clarke
2013	"Roots"	Roots	Yousef Thami
2013	"Clueless"	Roots	Yousef Thami
2014	"Lonely People"	Lonely People	Orla Gartland
2014	"Souvenirs"	Lonely People	Joey Phinn
2015	"Whispers"	Lonely People	Scott Tolleson
2018	"I Go Crazy"	Non-album singles	Guy Larsen
2018	"Between My Teeth"	Non-album singles	Ewen Farr
2019	"Flatline"	Why Am I Like This?	Jack Howard
2019	"Inevitable"	Why Am I Like This?	Guy Larsen
2019	"Did It to Myself"	Freckle Season	Zoe Alker
2019	"Figure It Out"	Freckle Season	Zoe Alker
2020	"Pretending"	Woman on the Internet	Rosie Brear
2021	"More Like You"	Woman on the Internet	Greta Isaac and Orla Gartland
2021	"Zombie!"	Woman on the Internet	Greta Isaac and Orla Gartland
2021	"You're Not Special, Babe"	Woman on the Internet	Greta Isaac and Orla Gartland
2023	"Kiss Ur Face Forever"	Everybody Needs a Hero	Alex Evans
2024	"Little Chaos"	Everybody Needs a Hero	Anne-Sofie Lindgaard
2024	"Late to the Party"	Everybody Needs a Hero	Clump Collective
2025	"Now What?"	Everybody Needs a Hero (Extended Edition)	Emily Marcovecchio
2025	"Pest" (featuring Tommy Lefroy)	Everybody Needs a Hero (Extended Edition)	Emily Diana Ruth

== Awards and nominations ==
Choice Music Prize

Year	Nominee / work	Award	Result
2022	Woman on the Internet	Irish Album of the Year 2021	Nominated

Ivor Novello Awards

Year	Nominee / work	Award	Result
2025	Mine	Best Song Musically and Lyrically	Won
