= This Is Your Song =

Single by Ronan Keating

from the album Songs for My Mother
- Released: 17 May 2009
- Recorded: 1998 (original version); 2003; Mark Angelo Studios (London) (2003 version); December 2008; British Grove Studios (London) (single version)
- Genre: Pop
- Length: 3:45 (radio mix); 3:57 (album version); 3:59 (2003 version); 3:47 (original 1999 version)
- Label: Polydor Records
- Songwriters: Ronan Keating; Steve Mac
- Producer: Stephen Lipson

Ronan Keating singles chronology
"Time After Time" (2009)	"This Is Your Song" (2009)	"Stay" (2009)

Music video
- "This Is Your Song" on YouTube

"This Is Your Song" is a song by Irish singer-songwriter Ronan Keating, written by himself along with Steve Mac. It was released digitally on 17 March 2009 as the second single from Keating's fifth studio album Songs for My Mother.

Originally the song was published in 1999 as the B-side of his debut single "When You Say Nothing at All" and a few years later it was rearranged and included in the album Turn It On (2003). Moreover, in 2004 it was included in the compilation 10 Years of Hits and published this once more as a B-side of the single I Hope You Dance.

== Background ==
Originally Keating had no intention of recording the song but, after his bandmates persuaded him, a recording was made for his debut single, released in 1999.

Keating talked about the difficulties he faced when writing and recording this song: "I tried to capture the woman that she [mother] was in the words to this song, but it wasn't easy. She loved her family more than anything in the world and all she wanted was to see them all grow up healthy, strong and happy. I guess as parents it's all we really want."

== Music video ==
The music video was filmed in Sydney, Australia around April 2009. Keating is seen visiting a house that appears to be his childhood home, and flashbacks of his childhood with his mother are projected around him.

== Track listing ==
- Digital download
1. "This Is Your Song" (radio mix) – 3:45
- German digital single
1. "This Is Your Song" – 3:57
2. "This Is Your Song" (2003 version) – 3:59
