= When Ronan Met Burt =

Studio album by Ronan Keating
- Released: 21 March 2011
- Recorded: 2011
- Genre: Pop
- Label: Polydor Records
- Producer: Burt Bacharach and Greg Wells

Ronan Keating chronology
Duet (2010)	When Ronan Met Burt (2011)	Fires (2012)

When Ronan Met Burt is the eighth studio album by Irish singer-songwriter and Boyzone frontman Ronan Keating. It was produced and composed by Burt Bacharach.

== Background ==
Backed by a full orchestra, all the tracks featured are classics composed by Burt over the course of his fifty-year career and include instantly recognisable hits such as "Walk on By", "The Look of Love", "What the World Needs Now Is Love" and "I Just Don't Know What to Do with Myself". All the tracks were recorded live with a full orchestra. In a promotional video, Keating admitted that he was intimidated by the prospect of working with Burt Bacharach, although he found the experience both exciting and energising. Keating also said that he found the songs far more complicated than they first appeared. He said: "It sounds so simple because that is the incredible ability that Burt has ... to create these songs that sound so simple ... but you try to sing them! Properly sing them! They are some of the hardest songs you'll ever sing." Bacharach is quoted on the same video, acknowledging that his music can be complicated but complimenting Keating for his dedication and professionalism. Keating promoted the album on 22 March on BBC Breakfast, 23 March on This Morning, 24 March on QVC, 26 March on Celebrity Juice, 27 March on This Morning, 28 March on Something for the Weekend, 29 March on The Alan Titchmarsh Show and 30 March on The National Lottery Results.

== Track listing ==
1. "The Look of Love"
2. "Walk On By"
3. "I'll Never Fall in Love Again"
4. "Arthur's Theme (The Best That You Can Do)"
5. "My Little Red Book"
6. "What the World Needs Now"
7. "Something Big"
8. "I Just Don't Know What to Do with Myself"
9. "This House Is Empty Now"
10. "Make It Easy on Yourself"

== Release history ==
Region	Date	Format
Ireland	18 March 2011	CD, digital download
United Kingdom	21 March 2011	CD, digital download
Australia	9 April 2011	CD, digital download
New Zealand	9 April 2011	CD, digital download

== Charts ==
=== Weekly charts ===
Chart (2011)	Peak position
Australian Albums (ARIA)	3
Irish Albums (IRMA)	5
New Zealand Albums (RMNZ)	9
Scottish Albums (OCC)	4
Swedish Albums (Sverigetopplistan)	56
UK Albums (OCC)	3

=== Year-end charts ===
Chart (2011)	Position
Australian Albums (ARIA)	71
Australian Jazz & Blues Albums (ARIA)	1
UK Albums (OCC)	122

== Certifications ==
Certifications for When Ronan Met Burt
Region	Certification	Certified units/sales
Australia (ARIA)	Gold	35,000^{^}
United Kingdom (BPI)	Gold	100,000^{*}
^{*} Sales figures based on certification alone.^{^} Shipments figures based on certification alone.
