= Fires (Ronan Keating album) =

Studio album by Ronan Keating
- Released: 3 September 2012
- Genre: Pop
- Length: 43:18 (Standard); 51:34 (Deluxe)
- Label: Polydor
- Producer: Gregg Alexander, Electric, Odd Jensen, Stephen Lipson, Cass Lowe, Paul Meehan, Rick Nowels, Brian Rawling, Dean Reid

Ronan Keating chronology
When Ronan Met Burt (2011)	Fires (2012)	Time of My Life (2016)

Singles from Fires
- 1. "Fires" Released: 17 August 2012; 2. "Wasted Light" Released: 3 December 2012

Fires is the ninth studio album by Irish singer Ronan Keating. The album was released on 3 September 2012, with a special deluxe, signed edition to be available from the Universal Music official store. It is his fifth album to contain original material and his first in six years following Bring You Home.

== Promotion ==
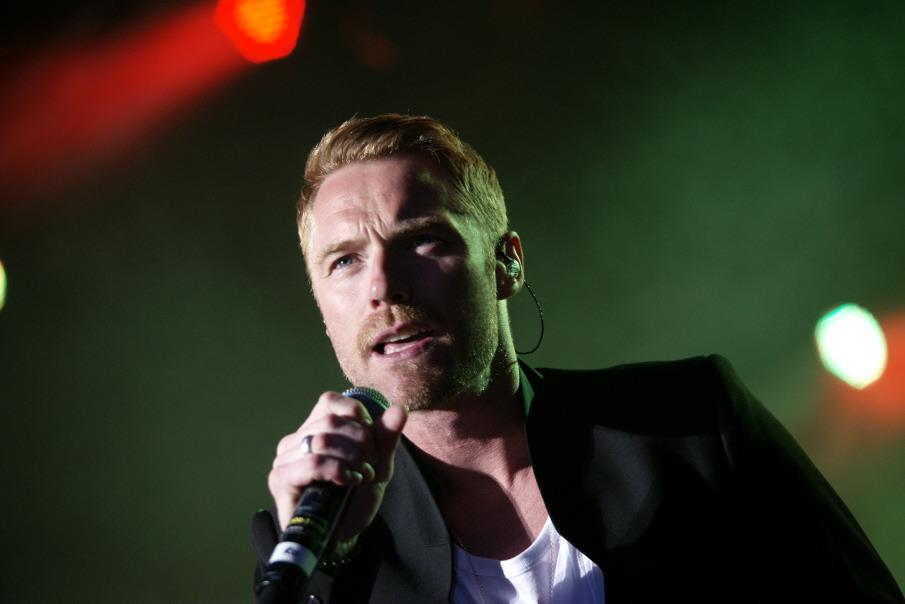
Keating performing in Klaksvík, Faroe Islands, in 2012

To promote the record, Keating embarked on a short promotional tour, which began on 3 August 2012, with the Summarfestivalur in The Faroe Islands. Other dates included the Þjóðhátíð festival in Iceland on 5 August, and the Festas do Mar in Portugal on 17 August as well as appearances in Germany and Australia. Keating also undertook two weeks of radio promotion around radio stations in the last week of August. A arena tour of the UK and Ireland commenced in January 2013.

== Singles ==
- "Fires", the album's title track, premiered on 21 July 2012 on BBC Radio 2. The music video for the song premiered on 1 August 2012, via YouTube. The single as released as a digital download on 2 September 2012. The song was only available as a digital download and sold 10,000 copies.
- "Wasted Light", is the second track on the album and premiered on 3 December 2012. The music video part live, part animated.

== Critical reception ==
On 22 August 2012 the album was voted album of the week by BBC Radio 2.

Professional ratings
Review scores
Source	Rating
BBC Music	positive
Daily Express	4/5 stars

Fires received positive reviews from BBC Music, critic Mike Driver declared that "a few bloopers aside, this is probably Keating’s best album since his eponymous debut."

The Daily Express gave the album a rating of 4 out of 5 and commented that "it's on songs such as Love You And Leave You that you get a whiff of a truly original artist." However, it also said that Keating had "put together something that, while slick and seamless, doesn’t really say anything new and mostly sounds a little sub-something else, largely Scissor Sisters."

== Track listing ==
No.	Title	Writer(s)	Producer(s)	Length
1.	"Fires"	Edvard Førre Erfjord, Henrik Barman Michelsen, Shelly Poole	Electric	3:51
2.	"I've Got You"	Ronan Keating, Paddy Dalton, Mathias Wollo	Electric	3:53
3.	"Love You and Leave You"	Odd Jensen, Cass Lowe	Electric, Cass Lowe, Odd Jensen	3:15
4.	"Nineteen Again"	Gregg Alexander, Rick Nowels	Gregg Alexander, Rick Nowels, Dean Reid	3:21
5.	"Wasted Light"	Erfjord, Michelsen, Gary Go	Electric	4:03
6.	"Lullaby" (featuring KizMusic)	Jamie Hartman, Lee DeWyze, Andy Stochansky, KizMusic	Brian Rawling, Paul Meehan	3:57
7.	"Easy Now My Dear"	Keating, Dalton, Wollo	Electric	3:46
8.	"NYC Girl"	Orion Simprini, Linda Horwatt, Sherif Fanous, Chris Sokolewitz, Jon Weber	Brian Rawling, Paul Meehan	3:48
9.	"Oxygen"	Erfjord, Michelsen, Lowe	Electric, Cass Lowe	3:19
10.	"Close Your Eyes"	Nicole Dash Jones, Matt Schwartz, Daniel Spencer	Stephen Lipson	3:59
11.	"Get Back to What Is Real"	Alexander, Nowels	Gregg Alexander, Rick Nowels, Dean Reid	3:20
12.	"The One You Love"	Don Mescall, Vanbrugh Hill	Brian Rawling, Paul Meehan	4:42

Deluxe Edition additional tracks
No.	Title	Writer(s)	Producer(s)	Length
13.	"It's Alright"	Dalton, Wollo	Stephen Lipson	2:51
14.	"Will You Ever Be Mine?"	Alexander, Nowels		3:32
15.	"Lullaby"	Jamie Hartman, Lee DeWyze, Andy Stochansky	Brian Rawling, Paul Meehan	3:54

== Chart performance ==
Chart (2012)	Peak position
Australian Albums (ARIA)	12
Austrian Albums (Ö3 Austria)	51
Belgian Albums Chart (Flanders)	138
Croatian International Albums (HDU)ERROR in "Croatia": Missing parameters: id.	12
German Albums (Offizielle Top 100)	20
Irish Albums (IRMA)	12
Dutch Albums (Album Top 100)	35
New Zealand Albums (RMNZ)	18
Norwegian Albums (VG-lista)	8
Scottish Albums (OCC)	3
Swiss Albums (Schweizer Hitparade)	26
UK Albums (OCC)	5
