= Too Late for Hallelujah =

"Too Late For Hallelujah"

Single by Aslan

from the album Nudie Books & Frenchies
- Released: March 2, 2012
- Recorded: 2011
- Genre: Rock
- Length: 3.46
- Label: EMI
- Songwriters: Carl Falk, Daniel Paul Meskell, Sharon Vaughn

Aslan singles chronology
""Jealous Guy"" (2012)	"Too Late For Hallelujah" (2012)

"Too Late For Hallelujah" is a single by the Dublin group Aslan. Originally recorded by Boyzone on their 2010 album Brother, it is taken from Aslan's album Nudie Books & Frenchies and was released on 2 March 2012, reaching number 28 on the Irish Singles Chart. On 24 May 2012, the band performed the song live on Craig Doyle Live on RTÉ Two.

== Chart positions ==
Chart (2012)	Peak position
Ireland (IRMA)	24
