= Winter Songs (Ronan Keating album) =

Studio album by Ronan Keating
- Released: 16 November 2009
- Length: 41:15
- Label: Polydor
- Producer: Stephen Lipson

Ronan Keating chronology
Songs for My Mother (2009)	Winter Songs (2009)	Duet (2010)

Singles from Winter Songs
- 1. "Stay" Released: 16 November 2009

Winter Songs (in Australia and New Zealand titled Stay) is the sixth studio album released by Irish singer/songwriter and Boyzone frontman Ronan Keating. It was released by Polydor Records on 16 November 2009 in the UK and Ireland, debuting at number 16 and 12 in each respective album chart. The first single, a cover of Grammy Award-winning American country music duo Sugarland's hit "Stay", was released digitally on the same day.

== Background ==
Winter Songs followed Keating's UK number-one album Songs for My Mother, released just six months earlier. Capturin his personal memories of winter and Christmas, the collection includes traditional holiday favorites songs as "Silent Night" and "Have Yourself a Merry Little Christmas," alongside modern festive classics like Joni Mitchell's "River" and Sugarland's "Stay." Keating also recorded three originals songs, including "It's Only Christmas" and "Scars." As with his previous album, Winter Songs was produced by Stephen Lipson. Notably, the album includes the final studio recording of fellow Boyzone member Stephen Gately, who passed away shortly after its completion.

== Critical reception ==
Professional ratings
Review scores
Source	Rating
AllMusic	2.5/5 stars
laut.de	2/5 stars

Jackie Hayden from Hot Press Hayden praised Winter Songs as a touching tribute to Stephen Gately, highlighting his strong performances on well-known songs and his own originals. He noted a few missteps in production and song attribution but concluded that Keating has matured into a confident solo artist and all-round family entertainer. BBC critic Mike Diver called Winter Songs a heartfelt, understated festive album where Keating's warm voice, personal song choices, and subtle arrangements create a sincere, reflective holiday collection.

Jon O'Brien of AllMusic concluded that "despite a few flashes of inspiration, Winter Songs' tasteful but bland production, and its overreliance on cover versions, offer little new to make it stand out in an already crowded seasonal market." laut.de editor Deborah Schmidt felt that with Winter Songs "has overreached a bit here with some songs that are true classics in their original form. Those familiar with the original versions will probably prefer them. Despite his admittedly nice voice, the singer simply cannot match the stature of artists like Simon & Garfunkel, Bob Dylan, or even Johnny Cash. Keating himself seems aware of this, as his winter songs come across as far too harmless and almost shy."

== Commercial performance ==
Winter Songs achieved moderate commercial success internationally, appearing on several national album charts. The album peaked at number 24 on the Australian Albums Chart, number 73 on the German Albums Chart, and reached number 12 in Ireland. In New Zealand (RMNZ), it peaked at number 25, while in Scotland and the United Kingdom, it reached number 16. On 22 July 2013, Winter Songs was certified Gold by the British Phonographic Industry (BPI), denoting sales of over 100,000 units.

== Track listing ==
All tracks produced by Stephen Lipson.

Winter Songs track listing
No.	Title	Writer(s)	Length
1.	"Winter Song"	Sara Bareilles; Ingrid Michaelson	4:18
2.	"Stay"	Jennifer Nettles	4:36
3.	"Scars"	Steve McEwan; John White	3:59
4.	"Homeward Bound"	Paul Simon	3:14
5.	"River"	Joni Mitchell	4:04
6.	"It's Only Christmas"	Ronan Keating; Paul Barry	3:24
7.	"Little Drummer Boy" (guest vocals by Stephen Gately)	Katherine Davis; Henry Onorati; Harry Simeone	3:13
8.	"Ring Them Bells"	Bob Dylan	3:27
9.	"Caledonia"	Dougie MacLean (Note: The booklet mistakenly credits Fleecy Moore, composer of Caldonia.)	4:02
10.	"Silent Night"	Franz Gruber	3:15
11.	"Have Yourself a Merry Little Christmas"	Ralph Blane; Hugh Martin	2:51
12.	"I Won't Last a Day Without You"	Paul Williams; Roger Nichols	3:57
Total length:			41:15

Australian alternative track
No.	Title	Writer(s)	Length
6.	"It's Only Christmas" (duet with Kate Ceberano)	Keating; Barry	2:36

== Charts ==
Weekly chart performance for Winter Songs
Chart (2009)	Peak position
Australian Albums (ARIA)	24
German Albums (Offizielle Top 100)	73
Irish Albums (IRMA)	12
New Zealand Albums (RMNZ)	25
Scottish Albums (OCC)	16
UK Albums (OCC)	16

== Certifications ==
Certifications and sales for Winter Songs
Region	Certification	Certified units/sales
United Kingdom (BPI)	Gold	100,000^{^}
^{^} Shipments figures based on certification alone.
