= Summer Wonderland =

Single by Ronan Keating
- Released: December 9, 2016
- Length: 1:37
- Label: Decca, Universal Music

Ronan Keating singles chronology
"Breathe" (2016)	"Summer Wonderland" (2016)	"One of a Kind" (2020)

Music video
- "Summer Wonderland" on YouTube

"Summer Wonderland" is a Christmas song released from Irish singer/songwriter Ronan Keating. The song is a "summer" version of the Christmas carol "Winter Wonderland" and recorded as a promotion for Air New Zealand.

Air New Zealand's General Manager Global Brand and Content Marketing Jodi Williams says the homegrown lyrics will remind local audiences of the moments that make a Kiwi Christmas, while the song also sends an enticing message to prospective visitors around the world saying "The idea of sleigh bells and snow doesn't really resonate for us in the Southern Hemisphere so we wanted to have fun with the concept of 'carol equality' and come up with a song we Kiwis and Aussies can relate to."

== Music video ==
The music video for the song premiered on 30 November 2016, via YouTube. The video directed by Craig Melville, features Keating recording "Winter Wonderland" in the studio, with Kiwi child actor Julian Dennison playing the producer, with whom the lyrics are not resonating. The two move outside and change the lyrics to apply to a summer Christmas, including references to pavlova, pineapples on ham, backyard cricket, distant relatives, and mozzie spray.

== Reception ==
Sophie Barker from MTV Australia called the song "the ultimate Christmas Carol". news.com.au called the song "hilarious".

== Chart performance ==
Chart (2016)	Peak position
New Zealand (Recorded Music NZ)	14
