= Songs for My Mother =

Studio album by Ronan Keating
- Released: 16 March 2009
- Genre: Pop
- Length: 37:11
- Label: Polydor Records
- Producer: Stephen Lipson

Ronan Keating chronology
Bring You Home (2006)	Songs for My Mother (2009)	Winter Songs (2009)

Singles from Songs for My Mother
- 1. "Time After Time" Released: 15 March 2009; 2. "This Is Your Song" Released: 17 May 2009

Professional ratings
Review scores
Source	Rating
AllMusic	1.5/5 stars
laut.de	2/5 stars

Songs for My Mother is the fifth studio album by Irish singer Ronan Keating. It was released on 16 March 2009 on Polydor Records. Marking Keating's first album to be released since the reunion of Boyzone, the album was a commercial success, debuting at #4 on the Irish Albums Chart before peaking at #1 on its second week of release. It also peaked at number one in Australia and the United Kingdom. In New Zealand, the album debuted at number sixteen, jumping to number one the following week. The album spent three weeks at number one and was certified Platinum, selling over 15,000 copies.

== Background ==
The album was recorded over the span of two days during Christmas 2008 at British Grove Studios. The album was recorded with his usual backing band and a live orchestra. Ronan took time out of his busy Boyzone schedule in order to record the album. The album is produced by Stephen Lipson. The album was recorded in memory of his late mother Marie Keating and also to celebrate Mother's Day. The songs that Ronan chose to record for the album are songs that he remembers his mother listening to throughout his childhood. This album also contains a new version of his own song "This Is Your Song", a track which he wrote that originally appeared as the B-Side to his very first single, "When You Say Nothing at All", and his third studio album, Turn It On.

== Commercial performance ==
Released close to Mother's Day in the United Kingdom, Songs for My Mother opened at number one on the UK Albums Chart. Elsewhere, it debuted at number four on the Irish Albums Chart, before peaking at number one in its second week of release, and reached the top spot in Australia and New Zealand. In New Zealand, Songs for My Mother was certified Platinum, selling over 15,000 copies.

== Track listing ==
Songs for My Mother track listing
No.	Title	Original Performer	Length
1.	"Time After Time"	Cyndi Lauper	4:10
2.	"Make You Feel My Love"	Bob Dylan	3:30
3.	"Both Sides Now"	Joni Mitchell	3:58
4.	"Vincent"	Don McLean	4:14
5.	"Carrickfergus"	traditional (and Dominic Behan in the mid-1960s)	4:28
6.	"I Believe I Can Fly"	R. Kelly	4:44
7.	"Mama’s Arms"	Joshua Kadison	3:05
8.	"Wild Mountain Thyme"	Francis McPeake	4:13
9.	"Suspicious Minds"	Elvis Presley	3:37
10.	"This Is Your Song"	Ronan Keating	3:59
Total length:			37:11

== Charts ==
=== Weekly charts ===
Weekly chart performance for Songs for My Mother
Chart (2009)	Peak position
Australian Albums (ARIA)	1
Austrian Albums (Ö3 Austria)	34
Belgian Albums (Ultratop Flanders)	14
Danish Albums (Hitlisten)	2
Dutch Albums (Album Top 100)	8
German Albums (Offizielle Top 100)	14
Irish Albums (IRMA)	1
New Zealand Albums (RMNZ)	1
Norwegian Albums (VG-lista)	7
South African Albums (RISA)	17
Swiss Albums (Schweizer Hitparade)	13
Scottish Albums (Official Charts)	1
UK Albums (Official Charts)	1

=== Year-end charts ===
Year-end chart performance for Songs for My Mother
Chart (2009)	Position
Australian Albums (ARIA)	35
New Zealand Albums (RMNZ)	9
UK Albums (OCC)	65

== Certifications ==
Certifications for Songs for My Mother
Region	Certification	Certified units/sales
Australia (ARIA)	Platinum	70,000^{^}
Ireland (IRMA)	Platinum	15,000^{^}
New Zealand (RMNZ)	Platinum	15,000^{^}
United Kingdom (BPI)	Gold	100,000^{^}
^{^} Shipments figures based on certification alone.
