= Duet (Ronan Keating album) =

Studio album by Ronan Keating
- Released: 12 November 2010
- Recorded: 2010; Studios 301
- Genre: Pop
- Length: 41:05
- Label: Polydor Records
- Producer: Greg Wells

Ronan Keating chronology
Winter Songs (2009)	Duet (2010)	When Ronan Met Burt (2011)

Singles from Duet
- 1. "Believe Again" Released: 5 November 2010

Duet is the seventh studio album by Irish singer-songwriter and Boyzone frontman Ronan Keating. It was produced by Greg Wells and features collaborations with Australian, New Zealand and international artists. It was released only in Australia and New Zealand on 12 November 2010.

== Background ==
Keating always held a special fondness for Australia and New Zealand and planned to release an album just for the two countries where he collaborated with both Australian and New Zealand artists. Keating explained "I have an amazing relationship with Australia and New Zealand. You have welcomed me with open arms and made me feel like one of your own and for that I thank you. So... I thought I would put an album together especially for you! On this record I have had the chance to work with some of your best and it has been an inspiration". The majority of the album was produced by Greg Wells and was recorded in Sydney's Studios 301.

The album also included collaborations with international artists Cat Stevens, Lulu, LeAnn Rimes and Elton John, all of which had been previously released.

== Critical reception ==
So far the album has received positive reviews. Australian reviewer Cameron Adams of Herald Sun gave the album a 3 out of 5 stars.

== Track listing ==
1. "Say Say Say" (featuring Adeaze) – 3:49
2. "All for Love" (featuring Guy Sebastian) – 4:44
3. "Believe Again" (featuring Paulini) – 3:39
4. "To Love Somebody" (featuring Brian McFadden) – 3:22
5. "Islands in the Stream" (featuring The McClymonts) – 3:59
6. "Wild World" (featuring Marvin Priest) – 3:20
7. "The Long Goodbye" (featuring Lee Kernaghan) – 4:11
8. "Last Thing on My Mind" (featuring LeAnn Rimes) – 3:57
9. "Father & Son" (featuring Cat Stevens) – 3:21
10. "We've Got Tonight" (featuring Lulu) – 3:37
11. "Your Song" (featuring Elton John) (Live 2000 / Madison Square Garden, New York) – 4:06
12. "It's Only Christmas" (featuring Hayley Westenra) – 3:25

== Charts ==
=== Weekly charts ===
Chart (2010–2011)	Peak position
Australian Albums (ARIA)	3
New Zealand Albums (RMNZ)	1

=== Year-end charts ===
Chart (2010)	Position
Australian Albums (ARIA)	18
New Zealand Albums (RMNZ)	9

== Certifications ==
Region	Certification	Certified units/sales
Australia (ARIA)	Platinum	70,000^{^}
New Zealand (RMNZ)	2× Platinum	30,000^{^}
^{^} Shipments figures based on certification alone.

== Release history ==
Region	Date	Format	Label	Catalogue
Australia	12 November 2010	CD, digital download	Universal Music	2756385
New Zealand	12 November 2010	CD, digital download	Universal Music	
