= Wasted Light =

"Wasted light"

Single by Ronan Keating

from the album Fires
- Released: December 3, 2012
- Genre: Pop
- Length: 3:51
- Label: Polydor
- Songwriter(s): Edvard Førre Erfjord, Henrik Barman Michelsen, Shelly Poole
- Producer(s): Electric

Ronan Keating singles chronology
"Fires" (2012)	"Wasted light" (2012)

Music video
- Wasted Light on YouTube

"Wasted Light" is a song released from Irish singer/songwriter Ronan Keating's ninth solo album "Fires". The song was written by Edvard Førre Erfjord, Henrik Barman Michelsen and Gary Go.

== Critical reception ==
Radio Creme Brulee stated that "On the song, Keating sings from the perspective of a man reminiscing about a love that took the form of a journey. This man pines with a hint of optimism for the return of that loved one. The track opens with a sparse acoustic guitar arrangement and a light mid-tempo percussion that one can easily snap his or her fingers to. It incorporates more sonic layers as the verses progress serving as a gradual build-up for the achingly beautiful chorus. The song paints quite a picture and despite its lyrics, has an uplifting feel with a flavor that is reminiscent of Keating’s debut single 'When You Say Nothing at All.'"

== Music video ==
The music video for the song premiered on 28 November 2012, via YouTube. The music video part live, part animated.

== Track listing ==
Album version
No.	Title	Length
5.	"Wasted Light"	4:03

== Chart performance ==
Chart (2012)	Peak position
UK Singles (Official Charts Company)	181
