= Lonely People (EP) =

EP by Orla Gartland
- Released: 18 January 2015
- Genre: indie pop, indie folk
- Length: 13:57
- Label: Independent

Orla Gartland chronology
Roots (2013)	Lonely People (2015)

Lonely People is the second EP by Orla Gartland.

== Reception ==
Earmilk commented about the title track, "Like all of her music, 'Lonely People' comes directly from the heart ... the sincerity of her singing ... continues to be Gartland's most endearing quality." Wonderland magazine selected it as a Track of the Week on 1 December 2014.When the Gramophone Rings said that Gartland "makes it apparent she has a lot more to give". Fortitude Magazine individually reviewed each song on the EP and wrote that Gartland "provides a wonderful EP with an excellent vocal performance and great songwriting". Digital Spy recommended "Wispers" as a song "you need to hear".

On 28 December 2014 Gartland, was interviewed on Weekend Breakfast With Stephen Byrne broadcast nationally in Ireland on RTÉ 2fm. He played two tracks from the EP, "Lonely People" and "Souvenirs".

== Track listing ==
No.	Title	Length
1.	"Lonely People"	3:09
2.	"Souvenirs"	3:57
3.	"Whispers"	3:43
4.	"Get Back"	3:08

== Music videos ==
On 30 November 2014, Gartland released a video of the title track, "Lonely People". It is a compilation of video clips Gartland requested from fans. On 19 December 2014, Gartland released a video of an acoustic performance of the third track, "Whispers". It was filmed in the YouTube Creative Space at Google in London. On 27 December 2014, Gartland released a video of "Souvenirs" which is set to classic 1990s-era computer graphics. On 13 January 2015, Gartland released a music video of "Whispers" which was produced by SteamyintheCity Creator Studio in Los Angeles.

== Tour ==
Gartland toured in support of the Lonely People EP in February 2015, headlining ten shows in the UK and Ireland and seven shows in the US and Canada in March 2015, her first tour in North America.
