= Bring You Home =

Studio album by Ronan Keating
- Released: 5 June 2006
- Recorded: 2005–2006
- Genre: Pop
- Length: 49:59
- Label: Polydor
- Producers: Mark Taylor; Steve Mac

Ronan Keating chronology
10 Years of Hits (2004)	Bring You Home (2006)	Songs for My Mother (2009)

Singles from Bring You Home
- 1. "All Over Again" Released: 29 May 2006; 2. "Iris" Released: 14 July 2006; 3. "This I Promise You" Released: 13 November 2006

Professional ratings
Review scores
Source	Rating
Entertainment.ie	1/5 stars
MTV Asia	5/10

Bring You Home is the fourth studio album by Irish singer-songwriter Ronan Keating. It was released by Polydor Records on 5 June 2006. It was his last studio album before he returned to newly reformed Boyzone. The album debuted at number three on the UK Albums Chart.

== Background ==
Three singles were released from the album: "All Over Again" (featuring Kate Rusby), "Iris" (a cover of the Goo Goo Dolls' hit song), and "This I Promise You", which was released as a download-single only. The album also contains the song "To Be Loved", which was originally recorded by Westlife on their 2001 album World of Our Own. However, Keating's uses completely different lyrics for the second verse of the song. This is only one of two songs on the album that were produced by Steve Mac, who originally co-wrote it. The album was primarily produced by Mark Taylor. "Just When I'd Given Up Dreaming" was co-written with American singer/songwriter, Richard Marx. The album has been certified Platinum in Australia, and has sold more than 70,000 copies there. The album has also achieved Gold status in UK, selling more than 100,000 copies.

== Track listing ==
- All tracks produced by Mark Taylor; except "To Be Loved" and "Back in the Backseat" produced by Steve Mac.

Standard version
No.	Title	Writer(s)	Length
1.	"Friends in Time"	Jeremy Gluck, Des O'Byrne, Simon Edmund Carmody	5:44
2.	"This I Promise You"	Ronan Keating, Paul Barry, Mark Taylor	3:55
3.	"All Over Again" (featuring Kate Rusby)	Don Mescall, Randy Goodrum	4:31
4.	"Iris"	John Rzeznik	4:08
5.	"To Be Loved"	Steve Mac, Wayne Hector, Willy Russell	3:04
6.	"Superman"	Keating, Barry	4:19
7.	"It's So Easy Lovin' You"	Keating, Steve Robson, Hector	4:08
8.	"Back in the Backseat"	Mac, Hector	3:39
9.	"Bring You Home"	Keating, Barry, Taylor	3:16
10.	"Hello Again"	Neil Diamond, Alan Lindgren	4:02
11.	"Just When I'd Given Up Dreaming"	Keating, Richard Marx	4:17
12.	"(We Just Need) Time"	Keating, Gregg Alexander, James McNally	3:56

International and re-issue versions (bonus track)
No.	Title	Length
13.	"So Far Away"	3:55

iTunes Store version (bonus track)
No.	Title	Writer(s)	Length
13.	"Iris" (acoustic)	Rzeznik	3:32

Notes

- The Portuguese version replaces "All Over Again" with a duet version with Rita Guerra.

== Charts ==
=== Weekly charts ===
Chart (2006)	Peak position
Australian Albums (ARIA)	6
Austrian Albums (Ö3 Austria)	10
Danish Albums (Hitlisten)	33
Dutch Albums (Album Top 100)	89
German Albums (Offizielle Top 100)	7
Hungarian Albums (MAHASZ)	28
Irish Albums (IRMA)	16
Italian Albums (FIMI)	86
New Zealand Albums (RMNZ)	7
Scottish Albums (Official Charts)	3
Swedish Albums (Sverigetopplistan)	10
Swiss Albums (Schweizer Hitparade)	3
UK Albums (Official Charts)	3

=== Year-end charts ===
Chart (2006)	Position
Australian Albums (ARIA)	61
German Albums (Offizielle Top 100)	94
UK Albums (OCC)	113

== Certifications ==
Certifications for Bring You Home
Region	Certification	Certified units/sales
Australia (ARIA)	Platinum	70,000^{^}
United Kingdom (BPI)	Gold	100,000^{^}
^{^} Shipments figures based on certification alone.
