= All Over Again (Ronan Keating and Kate Rusby song) =

2006 single by Ronan Keating and Kate Rusby

Single by Ronan Keating and Kate Rusby

from the album Bring You Home
- B-side: "Heaven"; "Back on Your Feet Again"
- Released: 29 May 2006
- Length: 4:31
- Label: Polydor
- Songwriters: Don Mescall; Randy Goodrum
- Producer: Mark Taylor

Ronan Keating singles chronology
"Father and Son" (2005)	"All Over Again" (2006)	"Iris" (2006)

Kate Rusby singles chronology
"Little Jack Frost" (2005)	"All Over Again" (2006)	"Planets" (2007)

"All Over Again" is the first single released from Irish singer-songwriter Ronan Keating's fourth solo album, Bring You Home (2006). The song, which features guest vocals from folk singer Kate Rusby, was produced by Mark Taylor and written by Don Mescall and Randy Goodrum. The song peaked at number six on the UK Singles Chart while also reaching number 20 in Ireland and number 33 in Italy.

== Track listings ==
UK CD1

1. "All Over Again" – 3:58
2. "Life Is a Rollercoaster" – 3:55

UK CD2

1. "All Over Again" – 3:58
2. "Heaven" – 3:17
3. "Back on Your Feet Again" – 3:51
4. "All Over Again" (video)

== Charts ==
=== Weekly charts ===
Chart (2006)	Peak position
Europe (Eurochart Hot 100)	19
Ireland (IRMA)	11
Italy (FIMI)	33
Scotland Singles (OCC)	3
UK Singles (OCC)	6
UK Airplay (Music Week)	9

=== Year-end charts ===
Chart (2006)	Position
UK Singles (OCC)	179
