= USS Voyager =

USS Voyager can refer to:

- USS Voyager (SP-361), a motorboat that served in the United States Navy from 1917 to 1919 and in the United States Coast Guard from 1919 to c. 1936
- USS Voyager (Star Trek) (NCC-74656), a fictional starship that is the primary setting for the television series Star Trek: Voyager

== See also ==
- HMAS Voyager, two ships of the Royal Australian Navy
- VSS Voyager, the proposed name for the second vessel in the Virgin Galactic fleet
- Voyager (disambiguation)
