= Voyage =

Voyage(s) or The Voyage may refer to:

== Literature ==
- Voyage : A Novel of 1896, Sterling Hayden
- Voyage (novel), a 1996 science fiction novel by Stephen Baxter
- The Voyage, Murray Bail
- "The Voyage" (short story), a 1921 story by Katherine Mansfield
- "Voyage", a poem by Patti Smith from her 1996 book The Coral Sea
- Voyages (poem), a 1926 poem by Hart Crane
- Le Voyage, 1996 graphic novel, see Edmond Baudoin
- Le Voyage, poem by Baudelaire

== Film and television ==
- The Voyage (1921 film), an Italian silent drama film
- The Voyage (1974 film), an Italian film
- Voyage (2013 film), a Hong Kong film made mostly in English
- Voyages (film), a 1999 film directed by Emmanuel Finkiel
- Voyage (1993 film), a 1993 American TV film directed by John Mackenzie
- Voyage.tv, an American online travel channel
- Voyages Television, an international travel marketing channel
- Voyage (French TV channel), a television channel in France operated by Pathé

== Music ==
- Voyage (band), a 1977–1982 French disco group
- Voyage (rapper), Mihajlo Veruović (born 2001), Serbian rapper
- ABBA Voyage, a 2022–2023 virtual concert residency in London by ABBA

=== Classical music ===
- The Voyage (opera), a 1992 opera by Philip Glass
- "Voyage", a 1948 song by Francis Poulenc
- Le Voyage, a 1967 ballet by Pierre Henry

=== Albums ===
- Voyage (ABBA album), 2021
- Voyage (Chick Corea album), 1984
- Voyage (Christy Moore album) or the title song, "The Voyage" (see below), 1989
- Voyage (David Crosby album), 2006
- Voyage (The Sound of Arrows album), 2011
- Voyage (Stan Getz album) or the title song, 1986
- Voyage (Voyage album), 1977
- The Voyage (album), by Johnny Duhan, or the title song, 2005
- The Voyage, by Haywyre, 2012
- Voyage (In Fear and Faith EP), 2007
- Voyage (Viviz EP), 2024
- Le Voyage (Paul Motian album) or the title track, 1979
- Le Voyage (Sandi Patty album), 1993
- Voyages, by Jesus Jones, 2018

=== Songs ===
- "Voyage" (Ayumi Hamasaki song), 2002
- "Voyage" (Zoë Më song), representing Switzerland in the Eurovision Song Contest 2025
- "Voyage", by Kim Se-jeong, 2023
- "The Voyage" (song), written by Johnny Duhan, popularized by Christy Moore, 1989
- "The Voyage", by the Moody Blues from On the Threshold of a Dream, 1969
- "Voyage, voyage", by Desireless, 1986

== Other uses ==
- Volkswagen Voyage, a sedan variant of the Volkswagen Gol automobile
- The Voyage (roller coaster), a roller coaster at Holiday World & Splashin' Safari in Santa Claus, Indiana, United States
- Voyage 200, a calculator from Texas Instruments
- Voyage: Inspired by Jules Verne, a 2005 PC game
- Voyages Tourism Australia, an Australian company
- Voyages-sncf.com, a travel agency website

== See also ==
- Exploration
- Journey (disambiguation)
- Travel
- Trip (disambiguation)
- Voyager (disambiguation)
- Voyageur (disambiguation)
- Wikivoyage
- Adventure
