= Songs from Home (Ronan Keating album) =

Studio album by Ronan Keating
- Released: 12 November 2021
- Genres: Pop; Folk-pop
- Length: 49:21
- Labels: Decca; Universal

Ronan Keating chronology
| Twenty Twenty (2020) | Songs from Home (2021) |

Singles from Songs from Home
- 1. "The Blower's Daughter" Released: 8 October 2021; 2. "Heyday" Released: 29 October 2021; 3. "The Parting Glass" Released: 10 December 2021

Songs from Home is the twelfth studio album by Irish singer-songwriter Ronan Keating. It was announced on 6 October 2021 and released on 12 November 2021. The album includes eleven cover versions and one original song, co-written by Keating.

== Track listing ==
Songs from Home track listing
| No. | Title | Writer(s) | Length |
|---|---|---|---|
| 1. | "Raglan Road" | Patrick Kavanagh | 4:07 |
| 2. | "Into the Mystic" | Van Morrison | 3:23 |
| 3. | "Where the Streets Have No Name" | Adam Clayton; Dave Adams; Larry Mullen; Paul Hewitt | 4:17 |
| 4. | "The Voyage" | Johnny Duhan | 3:55 |
| 5. | "The Island" | Paul Brady | 4:46 |
| 6. | "Summer in Dublin" | Liam Reilly | 4:07 |
| 7. | "Guiding Light" | Foy Vance | 5:00 |
| 8. | "No Frontiers" | James MacCarthy | 3:50 |
| 9. | "The Blower's Daughter" | Damien Rice | 4:42 |
| 10. | "The Parting Glass" | traditional | 3:23 |
| 11. | "Heyday" | Michael Patrick Christopher | 3:53 |
| 12. | "Set in Stone" | Dan Healy; Ronan Keating | 3:53 |

== Charts ==
Chart performance for Songs from Home
| Chart (2021) | Peak position |
|---|---|
| Australian Albums (ARIA) | 80 |
| German Albums (Offizielle Top 100) | 80 |
| Irish Albums (Official Charts) | 20 |
| Swiss Albums (Schweizer Hitparade) | 70 |
| UK Albums (Official Charts) | 15 |

== Release history ==
Release history for Songs from Home
| Region | Date | Format | Label | Catalogue |
|---|---|---|---|---|
| Various | 11 November 2021 | CD; Compact cassette; digital download; streaming | Decca | 3879352 |
