= Walnut Grove, Langley =

Walnut Grove
- Community
- Interactive map of Walnut Grove
- Country: Canada
- Province: British Columbia
- Region: Lower Mainland
- Regional district: Metro Vancouver
- District Municipality: Langley, British Columbia (district municipality)

Population
  - Total: 23,295
- Time zone: UTC-8 (Pacific (PST))
  - Summer (DST): UTC-7 (PDT)

Walnut Grove is a town centre (approx pop. 23,295) located within the Township of Langley, British Columbia.

"Walnut Grove" is located at cross roads north of Highway 1. To the north lie the cities of Maple Ridge and Pitt Meadows, connected by the Golden Ears Bridge. To the south is Langley City and Surrey is on the west. East of Walnut Grove lies the historic community of Fort Langley and other cities such as Abbotsford

== Infrastructure ==
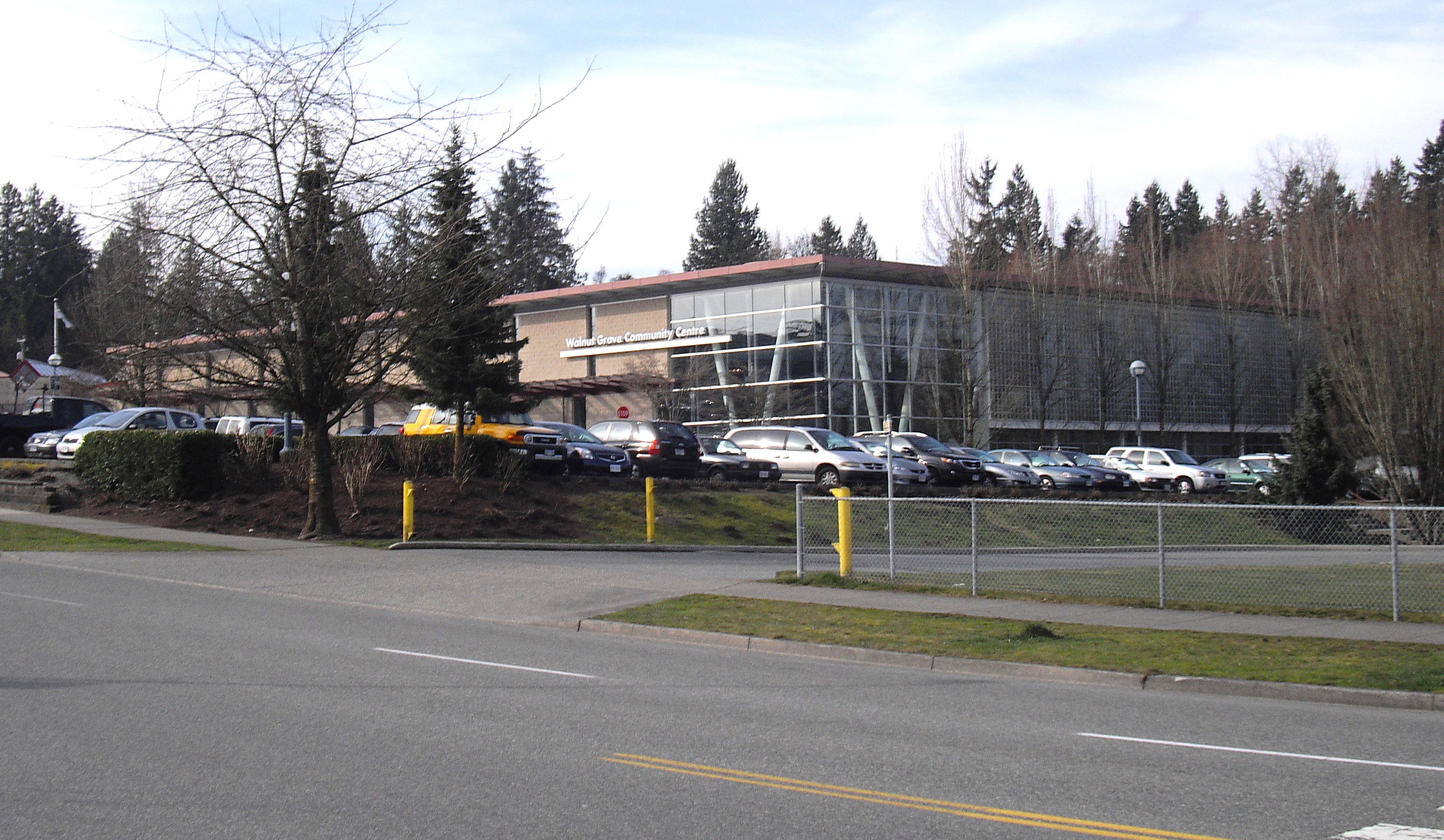
Walnut Grove Community Centre

=== Community Amenities ===
The Walnut Grove Community Centre hosts an olympic sized swimming pool, gymnasiums, meeting rooms, fitness facility, library and skate park.

To the north of the community centre is a full sized running track, adjacent to the high school.

=== Fire Hall ===
There is full-time fire protection provided by the Township of Langley Fire Hall 8

=== Policing ===
As with other town centres in Langley, policing is provided by the Royal Canadian Mounted Police. A community police station is located in a strip mall in Walnut Grove.

=== Health Care ===
There is a BC Ambulance Service station in the community with full-time staffed ambulances.

== Transportation ==
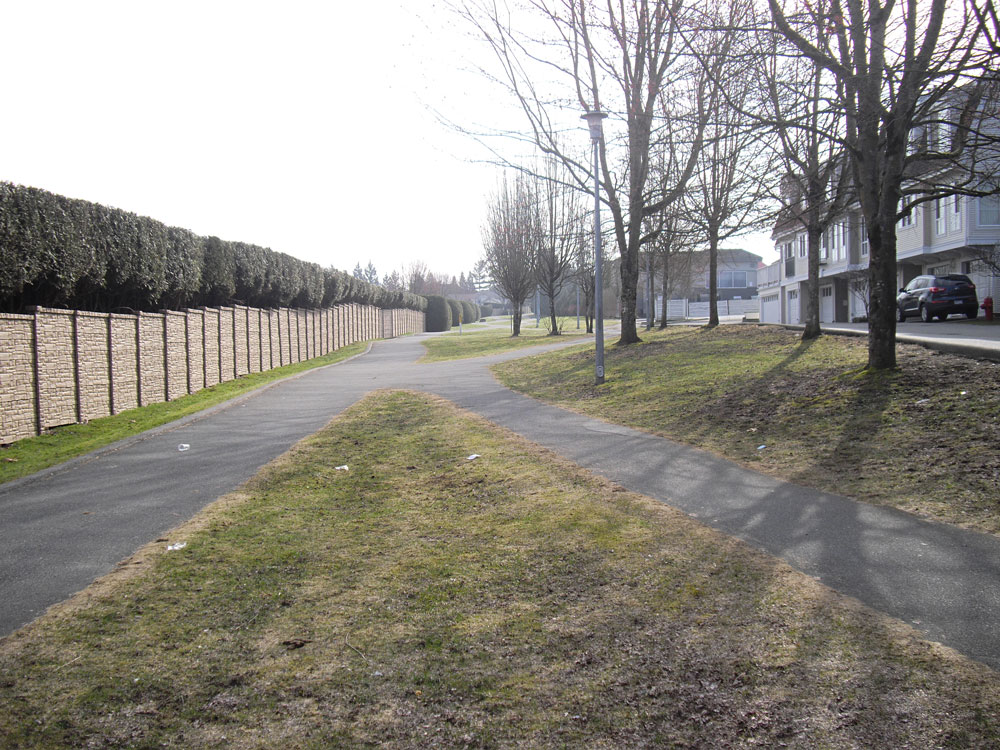
Greenways connect many neighbourhoods within Walnut Grove

Major roads include the Trans Canada Highway, Golden Ears Bridge, 200 Street and 88th Avenue. Bus Service is provided by TransLink.

== Schools ==
- West Langley Elementary School
- Alex Hope Elementary School (includes a French Immersion program)
- Gordon Greenwood Elementary School
- Dorothy Peacock Elementary School
- James Kennedy Elementary School (includes a French Immersion program)
- Topham Elementary School
- École Des Voyageurs (Francophone--belongs to Conseil Scolaire Francophone School District #93)
- Walnut Grove Secondary School

== Businesses ==
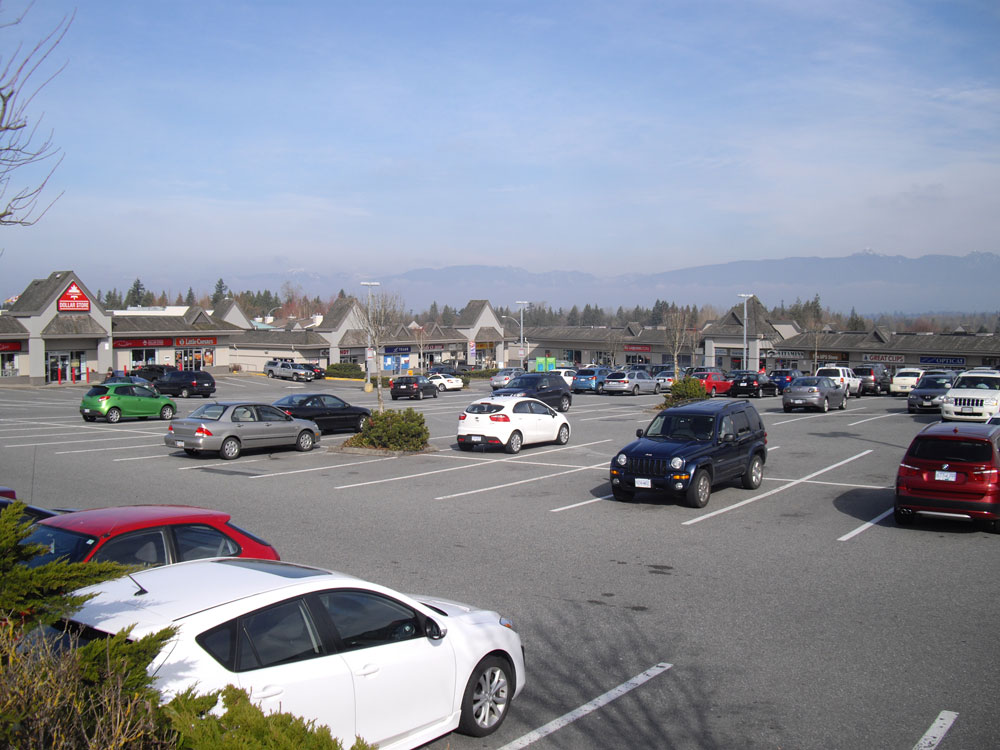
Walnut Grove Town Centre

Walnut Grove is home to many businesses, both independent and chain. There are several shopping plazas and two major grocery stores in the community. The Trans-Mountain Pipeline runs through the middle of the community underground, transporting crude oil from Alberta to the Coast. The community is located next to the North Langley Industrial Area - often referred to as Port Kells.
