= Mikawe =

Mikawe may refer to the following American ships:

- USS Mikawe (SP-309), a United States Navy patrol vessel in commission from 1917 to 1919
- USC&GS Mikawe, a United States Coast and Geodetic Survey launch in commission from 1920 to 1939
