= Daniel Healy (musician) =

Daniel Healy (Dan Healy) is a Scottish singer-songwriter and actor. He was a member of Glasgow-based jazz/pop trio Eoscene. In 2013, as a solo artist, he supported Lawson on their UK tour.

Healy has collaborated with Ronan Keating and co-wrote six songs which feature on Keating's tenth studio album, Time Of My Life, which was released on 12 February 2016. Keating and Healy met when they were both cast members in the West End Musical Once He also co-wrote 2 songs on Keating's album Twenty Twenty

Healy played Paul McCartney in Iain Softley's theatre production of Backbeat which had its World premiere at Citizen's Theatre Glasgow on 9 February 2010. The play transferred to the West End for six months in 2011–12 at the Duke of York's Theatre before relocating to Toronto at the Royal Alexandra Theatre in 2012 and then to Los Angeles at the Ahmanson Theatre in 2013.

Healys other theatre credits include: 'Eamon' in the West End production of Once and the title role in Peter Pan at the King's Theatre, Edinburgh. Continuing the Beatles theme, Healy played the young John Lennon in Bob Eaton's Lennon at the Royal Court Theatre, Liverpool.

Television credits include: River City (BBC); Daddy’s Girl (BBC); Taggart (Scottish Television); Wedding Belles (Channel 4); The Karen Dunbar Show (Comedy Unit/BBC); Chewin' The Fat (Comedy Unit/BBC).

Healy also runs an internet comedy group called The Bad News Crew. and in 2013 won the ‘Best Online Content Award’ at the Lovie Awards presented by Stephen Fry.

He played "Guy" in the regional premier of Once at the New Wolsey Theatre and Queen's Theatre, Hornchurch and in the first UK tour of Once the Musical
