= Time of My Life (Ronan Keating album) =

Studio album by Ronan Keating
- Released: 12 February 2016
- Genre: Pop
- Label: Decca; Universal
- Producer: Steve Lipson; Peter-John Vettese

Ronan Keating chronology
Fires (2012)	Time of My Life (2016)	Twenty Twenty (2020)

Singles from Time of My Life
- 1. "Let Me Love You" Released: 4 January 2016; 2. "Breathe" Released: 1 April 2016

Time of My Life is the tenth studio album by Irish singer-songwriter Ronan Keating. The album was released on 12 February 2016 by Decca Records.

== Background ==
In July 2014, Ronan Keating revealed that he had signed a new three album contract with Decca Records, saying: "Maybe I'm not valid but that's fine, I’m valid to myself, my family and the people who like my music." Ronan Keating announced the album on 25 November 2015 writing: "It's taken a year to write but in that time I have given the most honest piece of me." Keating has said the album was inspired by his wife Storm Uechtritz, whom he married in August 2015: "I think it's my best yet. I’m in a great headspace, the songs are all very optimistic and positive. I'm at this place in my life, I feel very secure. It’s all optimism and hope – it's because of this woman. I feel very lucky."

Time of My Life is Ronan Keating's first studio album in four years (since 2012's Fires), which is the longest span between two albums. Keating has said the album took a year to write and record: "It’s the longest I’ve ever spent making a record so it was a real pleasure to have the time to write and record without the pressure of having to rush to meet a particular deadline."

Ronan Keating said of the title, which comes from the song of the same name: "I threw around different ideas. It was gonna be Breathe, it was gonna be In Your Arms, and Time of My Life just felt right because I definitely feel I'm in my prime, you know—the best time in my life. And this albums reflects that."

== Singles ==
On 25 December 2015, the album was made available for pre-order on iTunes Store with "Falling Slowly" released on the same date as an "instant-grat" track.

The album's lead single "Let Me Love You" was released on 4 January 2016. The music video for the song premiered on 15 January 2016. It features Ronan Keating performing the song the South Bank in London, England as a group of buskers. Ronan Keating has said that the music video "mirrors where I am in my life and the way I now live it: optimistic, happy and without pretence".

"Breathe" was released as the album's second single on 1 April 2016.

Videos for "As long As We're in Love" and "In Your Arms" were released in July 2016.

== Critical reception ==
Writing for The Times, Will Hodgkinson gave the album two out of five stars, and wrote: "Time of My Life sticks to the kind of soft acoustic balladry that neither offends nor excites, with Keating singing one mellifluous song about true love after another."

== Track listing ==
No.	Title	Writer(s)	Producer(s)	Length
1.	"Let Me Love You"	Jon Green; Dan McDougall	Steve Lipson	3:15
2.	"As Long as We're in Love"	Green; Liz Rose; Emily Shackelton	Peter-John Vettese	3:01
3.	"Breathe"	Ronan Keating; Vettese; Dan Healy	Vettese; Lipson	3:07
4.	"She Knows Me"	Keating; Healy	Vettese	3:16
5.	"Time of My Life"	Norma Jean Martine; Adam Argyle; Martin Brammer	Lipson	3:23
6.	"In Your Arms"	Keating; Vettese; Healy	Vettese; Lipson	3:36
7.	"Landslide"	Keating; Healy; Storm Keating	Vettese	3:30
8.	"Keep It Simple"	Keating; Vettese; Healy	Vettese; Lipson	4:06
9.	"You Think I Don't Remember"	Keating; Vettese; Healy	Vettese	3:39
10.	"Shine Like Gold"	Red Triangle; The Vamps	Vettese	3:39
11.	"Grow Old With Me"	McDougall	Lipson	4:19
12.	"Falling Slowly" (featuring The Shires)	Glen Hansard; Markéta Irglová	Lipson	4:07

== Charts ==
Chart (2016)	Peak position
Australian Albums (ARIA)	6
Austrian Albums (Ö3 Austria)	44
Belgian Albums (Ultratop Flanders)	71
Belgian Albums (Ultratop Wallonia)	128
Dutch Albums (Album Top 100)	68
German Albums (Offizielle Top 100)	25
Irish Albums (IRMA)	26
New Zealand Albums (RMNZ)	26
Scottish Albums (OCC)	2
Swiss Albums (Schweizer Hitparade)	16
UK Albums (OCC)	4
UK Album Downloads (OCC)	10
