= Voyageur (disambiguation) =

Voyageurs are professional canoemen who transported furs by canoe during the fur-trade era in North America.

Voyageur may also refer to:

== People ==
- Coureurs des bois, independent fur traders in 17th and 18th century North America - sometimes called voyageurs

== Transportation ==
- Terminus Voyageur (disambiguation)
- Casa-Voyageurs railway station, Casablanca, Morocco
- Voyageur Colonial Bus Lines, a Canadian intercity bus company
- Voyageur Airways, a Canadian charter airline
- DTA Voyageur, a French ultralight trike design

== Literature ==
- Voyageurs (novel), a 2003 novel by Margaret Elphinstone
- Le Voyageur, weekly newspaper for Sudbury, Ontario, Canada
- Voyageur Press, an imprint of UK publishing house The Quarto Group

== Music ==
- Voyageur (Enigma album), 2003, or its title track
- Voyageur (Kathleen Edwards album), 2012

== Education and Schools ==
- Les Voyageurs (camp), a French-language immersion program run through the Concordia Language Villages
- École des Voyageurs, a French-language elementary school in Langley, British Columbia, Canada
- Voyageur Elementary School, an English-language elementary school in Quesnel, British Columbia, Canada
- Society of Les Voyageurs, student fraternity at the University of Michigan

== Other uses ==
- Voyageurs National Park, a US National Park in Minnesota, USA
- Ilot Voyageur, a city block and central bus terminal in Montreal, Quebec, Canada
- Festival du Voyageur, winter festival in Winnipeg, Manitoba, Canada
- Voyageurs Cup, Canadian pro-soccer club championship trophy
- The Voyageurs, a Canadian soccer fan club founded in 1996

== See also ==
- Voyager (disambiguation)
- Voyage (disambiguation)
