= Voyager 1 (disambiguation) =

Voyager 1 is a space probe launched by NASA in 1977.

Voyager 1 may also refer to:

- Voyager 1, an EP by the Verve
- Voyager 1, a fictional space probe in "Voyager's Return", an episode of Space: 1999
- Voyager I, a video game

== See also ==
- Voyager (disambiguation)
