= Voyager =

Voyager may refer to:

== Computing and communications ==
- LG Voyager, a mobile phone model manufactured by LG Electronics
- NCR Voyager, a computer platform produced by NCR Corporation
- Voyager (computer worm), a computer worm affecting Oracle databases
- Voyager (library program), the integrated library system from Ex Libris Group
- Voyager (web browser), a web browser for Amiga computers
- Voyager Digital, a defunct cryptocurrency brokerage company
- HP Voyager series, code name for a Hewlett-Packard series of handheld programmable calculators

== Transport ==
=== Air ===
- Airbus Voyager, Royal Air Force version of the Airbus A330 MRTT
- Frequent flyer program of South African Airways
- Egvoyager Voyager 203, an Italian ultralight aircraft
- Raj Hamsa Voyager, an Indian ultralight trike design
- Rutan Voyager, the first airplane to fly around the world nonstop without refuelling

=== Land ===
- Bombardier Voyager, a high-speed train operated in the United Kingdom
  - Bombardier Voyager (British Rail Class 220), a non-tilting train built 2000–2001
  - Bombardier Super Voyager (British Rail Class 221), a tilting train built 2001–2002
- Chrysler Voyager, a minivan
- Kawasaki Voyager, two series of motorcycles
- Mercury Voyager, a station wagon
- Plymouth Voyager, two series of vans

=== Water ===
- HMAS Voyager (D04), a Royal Australian Navy destroyer
- HMS Voyager (D31), a Royal Navy destroyer
- HSC Stena Voyager, a high-speed ferry
- HSC Voyager, a high-speed ferry
- USS Voyager (SP-361), a US Navy motorboat
- MS Voyager, a balloon launch and recovery ship for high altitude near-space tourism flights by Space Perspective

=== Space ===
- Voyager program, a NASA program of uncrewed space probes
  - Voyager 1, an uncrewed spacecraft launched September 5, 1977
  - Voyager 2, an uncrewed spacecraft launched August 20, 1977
- Voyager program (Mars), a cancelled series of space probes which would have traveled to the planet Mars
- Voyager (communications satellite), a series of American OSCAR satellites
- The Voyager, the first simulator constructed at the Christa McAuliffe Space Education Center
- Voyager Technologies, an American aerospace & defense company

== Arts and entertainment ==
=== Film ===
- Voyager (film), a 1991 German film
- V'Ger, or Voyager 6, a fictional NASA space probe in Star Trek: The Motion Picture (1979)
- Voyagers (film), a 2021 American science fiction film

=== Music ===
- Voyager (English band), a pop-rock group
- Voyager (Australian band), a progressive metal band
- Voyager (Manilla Road album), 2008 or the title song
- Voyager (Mike Oldfield album), 1996, or the title song "The Voyager"
- Voyager (Paul Epworth album), 2020, or the title song
- Voyager (Space Needle album), 1995
- Voyager (Walter Meego album), 2008
- Voyager (311 album), 2019
- The Voyager (album), by Jenny Lewis, 2014
- "Another Planet/Voyager", a 2004 song by Pendulum
- Minimoog Voyager, an electronic musical instrument
- "Voyager", a song from the Alan Parsons Project album Pyramid, 1978
- "Voyager", a song from the Daft Punk album Discovery, 2001
- Voyager, an album by Funk Trek, 2010
- Voyager, an album by The Jet Age of Tomorrow, 2010

=== Television ===
- Voyagers!, an NBC television series, broadcast from 1982 to 1983
- Earth Star Voyager, a 1988 television pilot that aired on Wonderful World of Disney
- Star Trek: Voyager, a UPN science fiction television series, produced from 1995 to 2001
  - USS Voyager (Star Trek), the titular starship of the series
- Voyager (submarine), the miniaturized flying submarine in the 1968–1970 animated TV series Fantastic Voyage
- "Voyager's Return", an episode of the ITV science fiction television series Space: 1999 featuring a fictional space probe "Voyager One"

=== Books ===
- Voyager (novel), a 1992 time travel romance novel by Diana Gabaldon
- Voyager: A Life of Hart Crane, a 1969 biography of Hart Crane by John Unterecker
- Voyager: Seeking Newer Worlds in the Third Great Age of Discovery, a 2010 book about the NASA Voyager program by Stephen J. Pyne
- Voyagers, a 1981 novel by Ben Bova
- Voyagers (Charlton novel), a 2026 science fiction novel by Meg Charlton
- Voyager Books, an imprint of HarperCollins

=== Other ===
- Voyager (video game), a canceled video game by Looking Glass Technologies
- The Voyager Company, a laserdisc and multimedia CD-ROM publisher
- Voyager (Xenosaga), a character in Xenosaga
- Voyager (comics), a character appearing in Marvel Comics publications.
- Voyager, a proposed Ferris wheel project to be built in Las Vegas, Nevada

== See also ==
- Now, Voyager, a 1942 American film
- Long Distance Voyager, a 1981 album by the Moody Blues
- Voyager of the Seas, the first of Royal Caribbean International's five Voyager-class cruise ships
- Voyage (disambiguation)
- Voyageur (disambiguation)
