= HMAS Voyager =

Two ships of the Royal Australian Navy (RAN) have been named HMAS Voyager.

- HMAS Voyager (D31) was a W-class destroyer. Commissioned into the Royal Navy (RN) in 1918. She remained with the RN until 1933, when she was transferred to the RAN. The destroyer remained in service until 23 September 1942, when she ran aground and was scuttled.
- HMAS Voyager (D04) was a Daring-class destroyer commissioned into the RAN in 1957. The ship was lost in a collision with the aircraft carrier HMAS Melbourne on 10 February 1964.

== Battle honours ==
Seven battle honours were awarded to ships named HMAS Voyager:

- Darwin 1942
- Calabria 1940
- Libya 1940–41
- Greece 1941
- Crete 1941
- Mediterranean 1941
- Pacific 1942

== See also ==
- USS Voyager
