= Twenty Twenty (Ronan Keating album) =

Studio album by Ronan Keating
- Released: 24 July 2020
- Genre: Pop
- Length: 47:36
- Labels: Decca; Universal

Ronan Keating chronology
Time of My Life (2016)	Twenty Twenty (2020)	Songs from Home (2021)

Singles from Twenty Twenty
- 1. "One of a Kind" Released: 14 February 2020; 2. "Little Thing Called Love" Released: 29 April 2020; 3. "Love Will Remain" Released: 10 July 2020; 4. "Forever Ain't Enough" Released: October 2020; 5. "Forever and Ever, Amen" Released: 12 February 2021

Twenty Twenty is the eleventh studio album by Irish singer-songwriter Ronan Keating. It was released on 24 July 2020 through Decca Records, after postponement from its announced release on 1 May.

== Background ==
On 12 February 2020, Keating announced the release of his eleventh studio album, titled Twenty Twenty, and its accompanying tour on his programme on Magic Radio. On the following day, he also announced the release and the tour on his Twitter. Twenty Twenty is Keating's first album in four years since Time of My Life (2016), and marks twenty years since the beginning of his solo career. The album has sold 30,000 copies in the UK, 10,000 copies in Australia, 5,000 copies in Germany and 5,000 copies in New Zealand.

== Singles ==
On 13 February 2020, the album's lead single "One of a Kind" was released. On 29 April 2020, the second single "Little Thing Called Love" was released. On 10 July 2020, the third single "Love Will Remain" was released. In October 2020 "Forever Ain't Enough" was released as the album's fourth single. On 12 February 2021, a cover of Randy Travis' "Forever and Ever, Amen" was released as the album's fifth single.

== Track listing ==
Twenty Twenty track listing
No.	Title	Writer(s)	Producer(s)	Length
1.	"Forever Ain't Enough"	Fraser Churchill; Thomas Mann; Benjamin Harrison; Hanni Ibrahim; Patrick Jordan Patrikios	Red Triangle	4:04
2.	"Little Thing Called Love"	Ronan Keating; Jonathan Wright; Daniel Healy; George Tizzard; Richard Parkhouse	Red Triangle	3:09
3.	"One of a Kind" (with Emeli Sandé)	Markus Feehily; Shane Filan; Edward Drewett; Churchill; James Birt; Tizzard; Parkhouse	Red Triangle	3:41
4.	"Only Lovers"	Birt; Ina Wroldsen; Tizzard; Parkhouse	Birt; Red Triangle	3:37
5.	"Forever and Ever, Amen" (with Shania Twain)	Paul Overstreet; Don Schlitz	Stephen Lipson	3:20
6.	"Love Will Remain" (with Clare Bowen)	Keating; Rachel Furner; Steve Robson	Red Triangle	3:09
7.	"The One" (with Nina Nesbitt)	Nina Nesbitt	Red Triangle	3:26
8.	"The Big Goodbye" (with Robbie Williams)	Robbie Williams; Martin Page	Lipson	4:32
9.	"Lovin' Each Day" (2020 version)	Gregg Alexander; Rick Nowels	Ash Howes; Alexander; Nick Lashley	3:29
10.	"When You Say Nothing at All" (2020 version with Alison Krauss)	Paul Overstreet; Don Schlitz	Lipson	4:12
11.	"Life Is a Rollercoaster" (2020 version)	Alexander; Nowels	Alexander; Lewis Thompson; Neave Applebaum; Lashley	3:24
12.	"One of a Kind" (orchestral version; with Emeli Sandé)	Feehily; Filan; Drewett; Churchill; Birt; Tizzard; Parkhouse	Red Triangle; Tobie Tripp	3:39
13.	"Something Wonderful"	Keating; Dan Healy; Peter-John Vettese	Vettese	3:54
Total length:				47:36

== Charts ==
Chart performance for Twenty Twenty
Chart (2020)	Peak position
Australian Albums (ARIA)	9
Austrian Albums (Ö3 Austria)	47
Belgian Albums (Ultratop Wallonia)	116
German Albums (Offizielle Top 100)	24
Irish Albums (Official Charts)	22
New Zealand Albums (RMNZ)	11
Scottish Albums (Official Charts)	1
Swiss Albums (Schweizer Hitparade)	10
UK Albums (Official Charts)	2

== Certifications ==
Certifications for Twenty Twenty
Region	Certification	Certified units/sales
United Kingdom (BPI)	Silver	60,000^{‡}
^{‡} Sales+streaming figures based on certification alone.

== Release history ==
Release history for Twenty Twenty
Region	Date	Format	Label	Catalogue
Various	24 July 2020	LP; digital download; streaming	Decca	0868493
