= The Burning Word =

Studio album by Johnny Duhan
- Released: 2010
- Genre: Folk

The Burning Word is an album by Irish folk singer Johnny Duhan. It was released in 2010.

The Burning Word is the first completely new album produced by Johnny Duhan in many years. The dove rising from the flame on the cover symbolizes both the spiritual nature of the songs and the collection's connection to one of Duhan's last studio albums, Flame, with which it may eventually be combined. Over the years Duhan has received letters from people all over the world telling him that the spiritual dimension in his songs has helped them through times of crisis as well as marking occasions of celebration. This contributed to his going below the surface of his faith for this work.

== Track listing ==
1. "The Coat"
2. "The Flame is Lit"
3. "This World is not Conclusion"
4. "Wonders"
5. "Surrender"
6. "The Burning Word"
7. "Song of the Bird"
8. "The Storm"
9. "Sure Amen"
10. "Part of the Tribe"
11. "Old Story"
