= Meg Charlton =

American writer

- Born: Meg Charlton; United States
- Education: Brooklyn College (MFA)
- Occupation: Writer
- Writing career
- Period: 2014–present
- Genres: Science fiction; literary fiction
- Website: megcharlton.com

Meg Charlton is an American writer based in New York City. She has published a literary science fiction novel and her articles and short stories have appeared in several of publications, including The Yale Review, Slate and Vice. Charlton has a Master of Fine Arts in fiction from Brooklyn College,

== Biography ==
Charlton began her career in television and film, screenwriting and producing documentaries. She said, "I sort of always knew I wanted to be a writer, and yet I thought I would have more interesting things to write about if I studied other things and tried other jobs." She tried her hand at sitcoms and comedy before moving to Vice, where she worked in journalism, film and video production. She wrote articles and short stories that appeared in several of publications, including The Yale Review, Slate, Vice, and an anthology, Letter to a Stranger: Essays to the Ones Who Haunt Us. The rights to adapt some of her short fiction for television and film have been acquired by 3 Arts Entertainment and SB Films. Charlton also wrote a young adult novel, which she described as "a darker Gossip Girl meets a more grounded Heroes", but attempts to get it published failed.

Then, while attending a Bread Loaf Writers' Conference, Charlton decided to apply for a Master of Fine Arts in fiction at Brooklyn College, and was accepted. She graduated in 2021, also winning the college's Creative Writing Award. Charlton stated:

"That was when I started to take writing more seriously. I had written bad screenplays, a bad novel, and a couple of short stories that got published. But it was in the MFA that I made writing the center of my life and really focused on it in a new way."

In 2021, Charlton began work on what became her debut novel, Voyagers, about the suspected abduction of two six-year-old children by aliens. She said she was inspired by listening to people's experiences at a 2016 UFO convention at Roswell she attended while on assignment for Vice News. Charlton had expressed relief that her first attempt at a novel was never published, but added that parts of it ended up in Voyagers.

== Bibliography ==
=== Novels ===
- Voyagers (2026, HarperCollins)

=== Short stories ===
- "On a Scale of One to Ten" (September 2014, Liars’ League)
- "Truly" (April 2016, Blunderbuss)
- "Intangible Variation" (February 2023, Slate)
- "Call Martini" (March 2023, The Yale Review)
