= To the Light =

Studio album by Johnny Duhan
- Released: 2008
- Genre: Folk

To the Light is an album by Irish folk singer Johnny Duhan.

To the Light charts Duhan's years on the road with bands in the sixties and seventies, tilting for fame and the girl. Its tone and rhythm come from the radios, jukeboxes, cafes, bars, dance-halls and nightclubs of the time it sings of. It is not a success story; numerous failures and heartaches are encountered on the road. One of a score of managers who quit working with Duhan out of a sense of frustration (Terry O’Neill) told Duhan that he was the only person he'd encountered in a long career in the music business with “a will to fail”. Duhan doesn't believe that this is quite true, but his uncompromising attitude to his work down the years has no doubt contributed to keeping marketplace success from his door. Though Duhan never quite makes “the big time” he eventually finds the girl and experience a moment of transcendence - illustrated in the song "To the Light" - that convinces him of the truth of a newspaper quotation that he once jotted into his song journal: “We Irish are suspicious of success knowing that there is a lot more of the infinite in its opposite.”

== Track listing ==
1. "Don Quixote"
2. "My Gravity"
3. "The Beggar"
4. "The Night You Left Me"
5. "Our Last Drive"
6. "There Is A Girl"
7. "There Is A Time"
8. "Don't Give Up Till It's Over"
9. "The Room"
10. "I'm Lucky I Had You"
11. "Girls In My Memory"
12. "Molly"
13. "All I Need"
14. "The Spider"
15. "To The Light"
