= Tree (Johnny Duhan album) =

Studio album by Johnny Duhan
- Released: 2002
- Genre: Folk

Tree is an album by Irish folk singer Johnny Duhan.

== Track listing ==
1. "And the Band Played"
2. "After the Dance"
3. "Inviolate"
4. "The Dark Side"
5. "All at Once"
6. "Your Sure Hand"
7. "The Second Time Around"
8. "Ireland"
9. "Morning Star"
10. "We've Come Through the Night"
