= Terminus Voyageur =

Terminus Voyageur may refer to:

- Gare d'autocars de Montréal, formerly Terminus d'autocars Voyageur
- Ottawa Central Station, formerly Voyageur motorcoach Terminus

== See also ==
- Voyageur (disambiguation)
