= Flame (Johnny Duhan album) =

Studio album by Johnny Duhan
- Released: 1996
- Genre: Folk
- Label: Bell Productions

Flame is an album by Irish folk singer Johnny Duhan, which was released in 1996.

== Track listing ==
1. "In the Afterbirth"
2. "The Blight"
3. "Flame"
4. "Face the Night"
5. "After the Dream"
6. "Captain"
7. "On the Water"
8. "My Father Was a Sailor"
9. "The Beacon"
10. "When You Go"
