= The Voyage (album) =

Studio album by Johnny Duhan
- Released: 2005
- Genre: Folk

The Voyage is a 2005 album by Irish folk musician, Johnny Duhan containing his internationally famous modern Irish folk classic "The Voyage".

The idea to write on the family theme grew organically out of Johnny's earlier excavations of family history in some of the songs on his Just Another Town album. Measuring the early struggles of his own marriage against his parents’ rocky relationship, he wrote a song called "Trying to Get the Balance Right", and this led on to reflections on the whole institution of marriage and child rearing. Over a six or seven-year period his thoughts on the subject crystallized into a series of songs that eventually became The Voyage album.

== Title track "The Voyage" ==
The title song "The Voyage" was one of the last songs of the collection to come to him. After exposing the raw nerves of the marriage struggle in many of the other lyrics – and maybe because he was open enough to give full expression to these familial difficulties - he felt empowered to write and sing of the more positive side of the marriage adventure with deep conviction and sincerity.

When the chorus of the title song "The Voyage" came to him out the blue, it took his breath away, mainly because he felt that it got to the nub of what family life is ultimately about - children. In 1989, the first of many covers of the song "The Voyage" was made, some consider as the definitive, certainly the most famous version by Christy Moore. In the folk section of iTunes download charts, Christy's version has almost had a permanent place in the top ten since the chart was established many years ago. Most popular songs have a short life span. "The Voyage" grows more popular with age. Many standard ballads are restricted by national boundaries. But "The Voyage" is sung all over the world in a variety of languages. Niall Stokes of Hot Press magazine has predicted that "The Voyage" will be around long after most popular rock songs are long forgotten. This echoes Christy Moore’s assessment that the song is destined for a high place in the canon of "folk standards".

== Track listing ==
1. "The Voyage" - 3:51
2. "We Had Our Trouble Then" - 2:38
3. "Cornerstone" - 3:32
4. "After the Dance" - 2:32
5. "And the Band Played" - 3:00
6. "Inviolate" - 3:06
7. "Trying to Get the Balance Right" - 3:32
8. "The Second Time Around" - 3:50
9. "Woken Gently" - 2:21
10. "When You Appeared" - 2:04
11. "Aoibheann & Alanna" - 3:50
12. "Your Sure Hand" - 2:26
13. "Face the Night" - 2:20
14. "Brian's Song" - 2:11
15. "Ireland" - 3:58
16. "We've Come Though the Night" 3:45
17. "In Our Father's Name" - 3:53
