= Yvonne Connolly =

Irish model (born 1974)

- Born: 8 February 1974 (age 51); Dublin, Ireland
- Occupations: Model; television personality
- Spouse: Ronan Keating (m. 1998; div. 2015)
- Partner: John Conroy (2012–present)
- Children: 3

Yvonne Connolly (born 8 February 1974) is an Irish model and television personality.

== Career ==
Connolly began her career working as a commercial model for brands including Coca-Cola, Superquinn, Bank of Ireland and the National Lottery. In 2013, Connolly competed in Celebrity MasterChef Ireland on RTÉ One. She was eliminated in the fifth week of the competition. Following her appearance on the show, Connolly picked up several cookery guest spots on television programmes including Virgin Media One's The Six O'Clock Show and ITV's This Morning.

In 2014, Connolly appeared as a mentor on the RTÉ One factual entertainment series, The Family Project.

== Personal life ==
On 30 April 1998, Connolly married Boyzone singer, Ronan Keating. Together, they have three children: a son Jack, born in 1999 and daughters Marie (known as "Missy") and Ali born in 2001 and 2005. In 2010, Connolly and Keating announced their separation; their divorce was finalised in March 2015. Connolly has been in a relationship with cinematographer John Conroy since 2012. In March 2023, Connolly became a grandmother for the first time, after her son Jack became a father.

In November 2019, Connolly was left with severe facial injuries when one of her horses kicked her in the face. Her injuries included a broken jaw, fractured nose and severely damaged eye socket. Connolly has spoken in-depth about her long road to recovery, but continues to train and ride horses.
