= Ronan Keating =

Irish singer (born 1977)

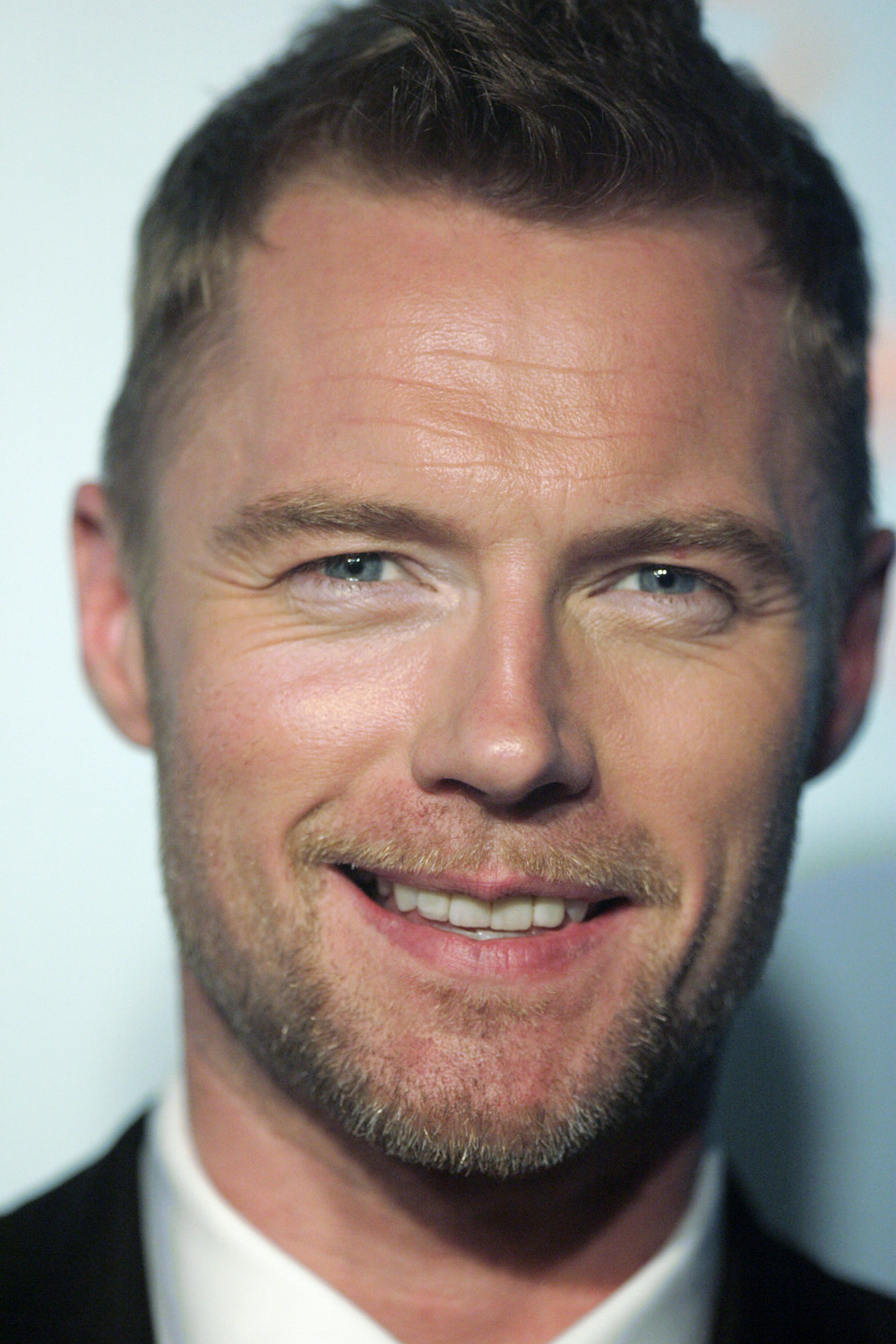
- Keating in 2013
- Born: Ronan Patrick John Keating; 3 March 1977 (age 49); Dublin, Ireland
- Occupations: Singer; songwriter; actor; presenter
- Years active: 1993–present
- Spouses: Yvonne Connolly (m. 1998; div. 2015); Storm Uechtritz (m. 2015)
- Children: 5
- Relatives: Ruairí Keating (nephew)
- Musical career
- Genres: Pop; country; soft rock; pop rock; adult contemporary; easy listening
- Labels: Polydor; Decca
- Formerly of: Boyzone
- Website: ronankeating.com

Ronan Patrick John Keating (born 3 March 1977) is an Irish singer, songwriter and media personality. He debuted in 1993 alongside Keith Duffy, Michael Graham, Shane Lynch, and Stephen Gately, as the co-lead singer (with Gately) of pop group Boyzone. His solo career started in 1999 and he has recorded eleven albums. He gained worldwide attention when his single "When You Say Nothing At All" was featured in the film Notting Hill and reached number one in several countries.

As a solo artist, Keating has sold over 20 million records worldwide alongside the 25 million records with Boyzone. In Australia, he is best known as a judge on All Together Now (2018), The X Factor (2010–14), and as a coach on The Voice Australia (2016, 2025–present). He has also served as a coach on The Voice Kids UK (2022–23) and The Voice of Germany (2023). He hosted a breakfast show on Magic Radio for seven years, ending in July 2024. Keating is active in charity work and has been a charity campaigner for the Marie Keating Foundation, which raises awareness for breast cancer and is named after his mother, who died from the disease in 1998.

== Early life ==
Ronan Patrick John Keating was born on 3 March 1977 in Dublin, the youngest of five children. He grew up in Bayside, County Dublin, and in County Meath, attending St. Fintan's High School. His father, Gerry Keating, was a lorry driver; his mother Marie was a mobile hairdresser. He competed in track and field, winning the All Ireland under-13 200 m title.

He has one sister: Linda, and had three brothers: Ciarán, Gerard and Gary. Ciarán died in 2023.

== Career ==
=== 1993–1999: Boyzone ===
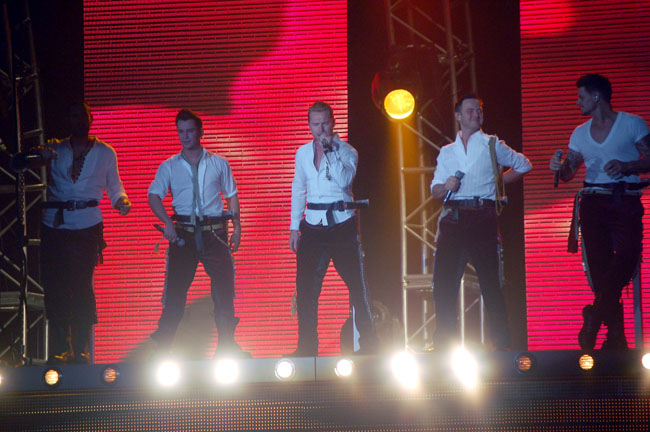
Boyzone performing on tour with Ronan Keating as the lead singer in 2009

In 1993, then 16-year-old Ronan Keating was the youngest member to join Boyzone. Keating, Keith Duffy, Richard Rock, Shane Lynch, Mark Walton and Stephen Gately were chosen as Boyzone members. Walton and Rock would later leave the group before being replaced by Michael Graham. The group performed in various clubs and pubs before being signed by PolyGram in 1994 and released a cover version of "Working My Way Back to You" by The Four Seasons. The group also released a cover version of "Love Me for a Reason" which would peak on several charts. In 1998, his mother died at the age of 51 from breast cancer, resulting in the establishment of the Marie Keating Foundation.

At the age of 21 years, Keating married Yvonne Connolly in April 1998 and together, the couple have three children: Jack (born 15 March 1999), Marie (born 18 February 2001) and Ali (born 7 September 2005). The couple divorced after Keating had an affair.

From 1994 to 1999, Boyzone released 17 singles, 3 studio albums and 1 compilation album before disbanding in 2000 selling 27 million records and 3 million records from 4 singles, 1 compilation and studio album since their reformation.

=== 1999–2006: Ronan, Destination, Turn It On and Bring You Home ===
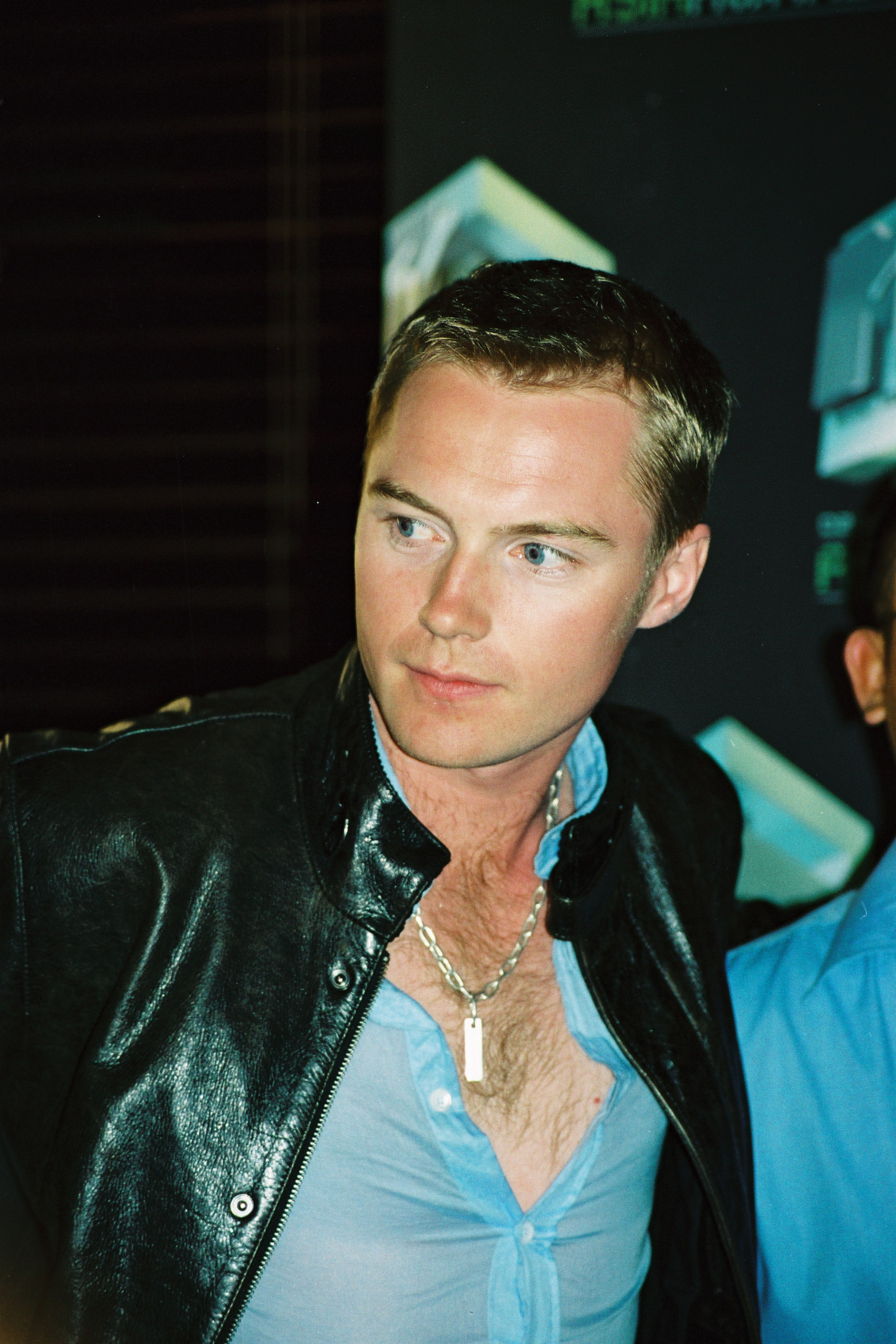
Keating in 2002

In 1999, while still a member of Boyzone, Keating recorded a version of "When You Say Nothing at All" for the motion picture Notting Hill. The single peaked at number one in the UK charts, leading to a successful solo career. Keating released his debut solo album, titled Ronan, in 2000, which peaked at number one in the UK Albums Chart. The album was given several negative reviews, although it sold over 750,000 copies and became one of the top selling albums of the year in the United Kingdom. It debuted at number one on the UK Albums Chart, and has been certified four-times platinum by the British Phonographic Industry for sales of 1.2 million copies. In the singer's native Ireland, the album debuted at number two. The album also became a commercial success in other European countries, where it charted within the top ten of eight countries. In 2001, Ronan was certified two-times platinum by the International Federation of the Phonographic Industry for shipments of two million copies inside Europe.

The album produced four UK and Irish top-ten singles: "When You Say Nothing at All" (originally recorded for the soundtrack of the 1999 film Notting Hill), "Life Is a Rollercoaster", "The Way You Make Me Feel", and "Lovin' Each Day", the latter of which was featured on the re-release edition of the album, and later on Keating's second album, Destination (2002).

After the successful debut album Ronan Keating continued on with his solo career and has since released four more studio albums: Destination (2002), Turn It On (2003), 10 Years of Hits (2004) and Bring You Home (2006), four of which peaked at number one in the UK Albums Chart. Keating collaborated with several major stars, including Elton John, Lulu, LeAnn Rimes and the Bee Gees, for these albums.

Keating and Paul Brady co-wrote the 2001 hit single "The Long Goodbye", one of Keating's most loved hits amongst fans and a huge hit for Brooks & Dunn in the United States. Keating and Brady won the "BMI European song-writing award" for the single. In 2003, Keating was named Rear of the Year – an award given to celebrities with a notable posterior. In October 2007, Keating was listed in the Guinness Book of Records for being the only artist ever to have 30 consecutive top 10 singles in the UK chart, beating the likes of Elvis Presley. Keating also embarked on two world tours, won the Ivor Novello and BMI songwriting awards, released an autobiography, had a role as ambassador for Christian Aid and had sales in excess of 22 million albums worldwide. In 2007 he released two fragrances, based on Sicilian lemon, lavender and Clary sage smells. All proceeds go to the Marie Keating foundation.

Keating performed at the 2006 FIFA World Cup opening party at the Brandenburg Gate in Berlin, Germany, in front of an audience of nearly 250,000 people, and posed nude for Cosmopolitan magazine's 10 Years of Naked Centrefolds. On 9 May 2007, Keating became the first international number-one selling foreign artist to perform a concert in Phnom Penh, Cambodia. Keating also performed at the Olympic Stadium Indoor Arena. Keating has performed duets with Elton John at Madison Garden in New York and has sung for the Pope twice and performed for Prince Charles at the Prince's Trust 30th birthday, which took place at the Tower of London. He performed on stage for the Swedish Royal family at Crown Princess Victoria's birthday celebrations, and at the opening ceremony of the 19th European Athletics Championships in Gothenburg.

=== 2007–2010: Boyzone reformation, Songs for My Mother and Winter Songs ===
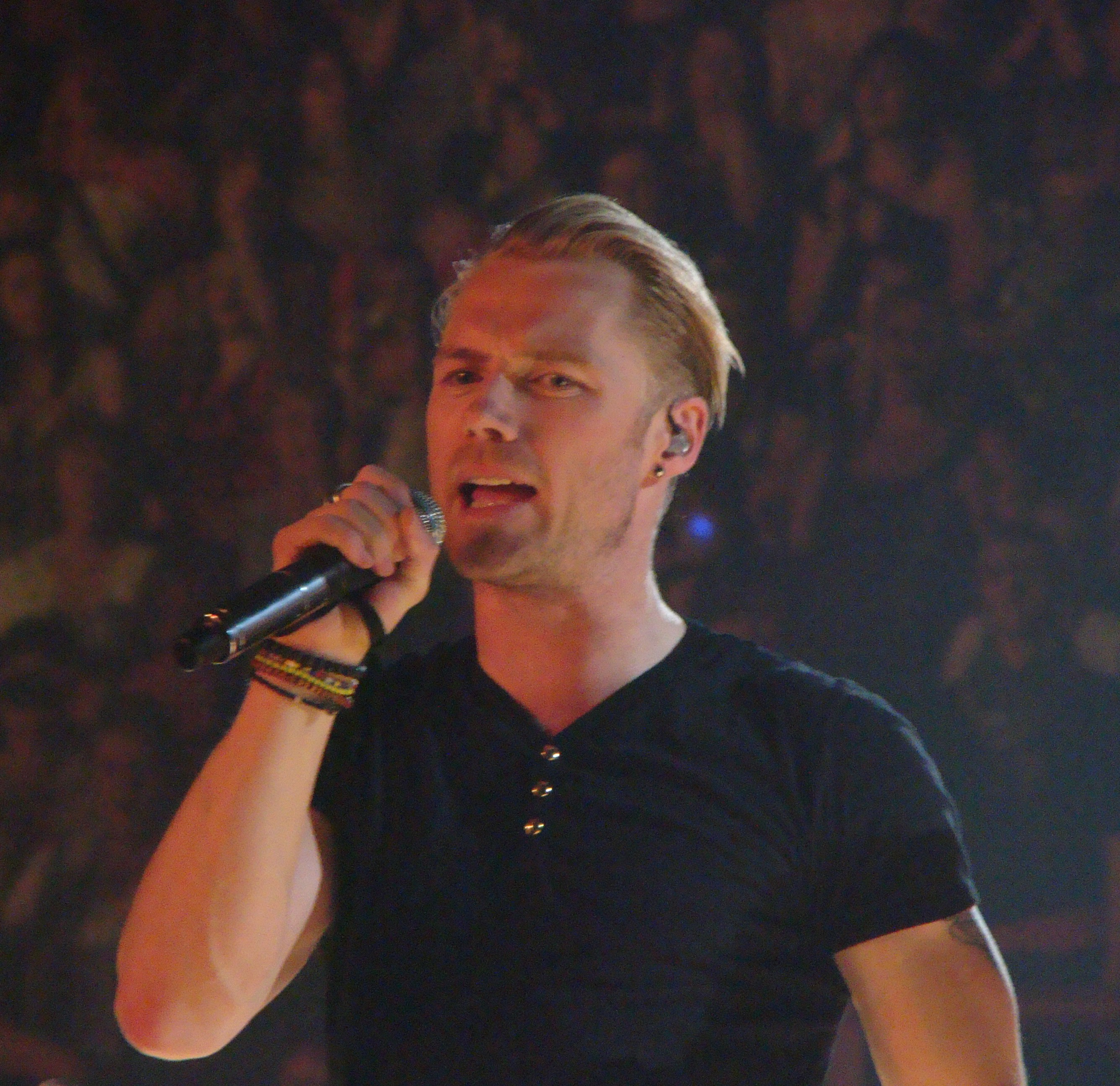
Keating performing with Boyzone in 2009

On 5 November 2007, Keating confirmed that Boyzone would reunite for a special appearance on the BBC's annual fundraiser, Children in Need, performing a medley of hits, although had not yet commented on the possibility of a new tour or album. Soon, they went on a 29-date tour, taking in cities such as Cardiff, Newcastle, Liverpool, London at the O2 Arena and Wembley, Manchester, Birmingham, Glasgow, Aberdeen, Sheffield, Newcastle, Nottingham, Edinburgh Castle and the RDS in Dublin. A greatest hits collection was released and two new singles in 2008 selling 700,000 copies. Stephen Gately, a close friend and bandmate of Keating, died on 10 October 2009 of a pulmonary edema.

In 2009, Keating co-wrote the song "Believe Again" sung by Niels Brinck, who won the Dansk Melodi Grand Prix and represented Denmark in the Eurovision Song Contest 2009 in Moscow where it qualified for the final from the second semi-final and finished in 13th place with 74 points. Following the success of the album Songs for My Mother, he has recorded another entitled Winter Songs. Teaming up again with Songs for My Mother producer Steve Lipson, Keating pulled together eleven songs that evoked memories of winter and Christmas for him. Winter Songs is a mix of traditional and modern festive classics, including tracks from artists such as Simon & Garfunkel, Joni Mitchell and Sugarland along with perennials "Silent Night" and "Have Yourself a Merry Little Christmas". The album also includes two new songs, "It's Only Christmas" and "Scars".

In March 2010, the new Boyzone album Brother was released and went to number one in the UK and Ireland selling 500,000 copies with very little promotion to add to the singles which sold 175,000 copies. On 12 November 2010, Keating released his seventh studio album, entitled Duet, in Australia and New Zealand. "Believe Again" was released as the lead single from the album and features guest vocals from Australian singer, Paulini.

=== 2010–2015: The X Factor, Duet, When Ronan Met Burt and Fires ===
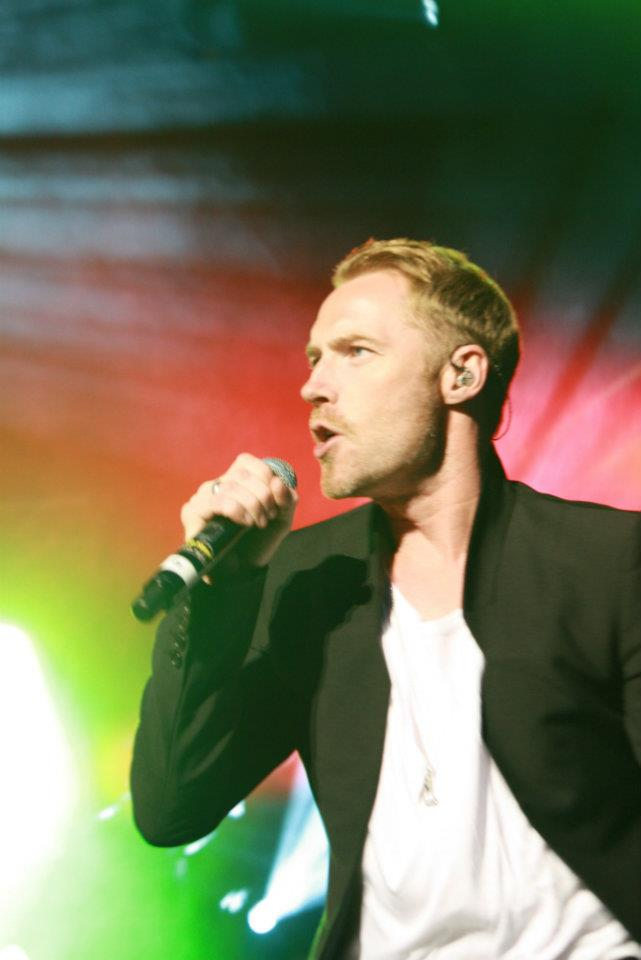
Keating performing "When You Say Nothing at All" in 2012

Keating joined the judging panel of The X Factor in 2010 to replace John Reid, where he remained for five seasons. He was the winning mentor on two occasions; in 2010 with Altiyan Childs and in 2014 with Marlisa Punzalan. He joined Boyzone on their tour of the UK and Ireland during February and March 2011 with a 21 date tour of the Ireland and UK with their arena-based Brother Tour, each of the band members received £1 million from it. The band stated that it was a tour dedicated to their brother 'Steo'. Singer/songwriter Guy Sebastian from Australia appeared as the support act. On 21 March 2011, Keating released an album of covers produced by Burt Bacharach titled When Ronan Met Burt. In April he began shooting scenes for his film debut in Australia; the film, Goddess, was released on 14 March 2013. He performed at the Westfalenhallen in Dortmund, Germany in front of a crowd of 16,500.

Keating toured Australia and New Zealand in the beginning of 2012 at the State Theatre in Sydney, Brisbane Convention Centre, Melbourne's Regent Theatre, Newcastle Entertainment Centre, Canberra's Royal Theatre, Wollongong Entertainment Centre, Adelaide's Festival Theatre and at Perth's Kings Park in front of 29,000, in all making £1.6 million. In July 2012 he visited Malta and performed with Maltese tenor Joseph Calleja and Italian pop-singer Gigi D'Alessio. He later joined his management for dinner at Palazzo Parisio.

His ninth studio album named Fires (the fifth to contain original material) was released on 3 September 2012 in the UK and 30 August in Ireland, Germany, Australia and worldwide. It was released through Universal Music and was produced by Greg Wells and co-written by Keating and Gregg Alexander. To promote the record Keating embarked on a short promotional tour on 3 August at the Summarfestivalur in the Faroe Islands in front of 14,000 fans, 5 August at the Þjóðhátíð festival in Iceland and on 17 August at Festas Mar in Portugal as well as appearances in Germany and Australia.

A tour of the UK and Ireland in 2013 saw Keating perform at Colston Hall in Bristol, The O_{2} Arena, Cardiff International Arena, Brighton Centre, Nottingham Royal Concert Hall, LG Arena in Birmingham, Bournemouth International Centre, Sheffield City Hall, Blackpool Opera House, Liverpool Echo Arena, Manchester Apollo, Newcastle City Hall, Clyde Auditorium and AECC in Scotland and The O_{2} in Ireland to an audience of 80,000 fans, which was predicted to make £3,000,000. On 21 July the single from the album, also named "Fires", was given its first worldwide release on BBC Radio 2. The video premiered on YouTube on 1 August 2012 at 9 am. It was released as a digital download and CD on 24 August worldwide and 27 August in the UK. "Wasted Light", is the second track on the album and premiered on 3 December 2012. The music video part live, part animated.

Boyzone reunited in 2013 to celebrate their 20th anniversary as a group. Keating said in February 2012, "Next year Boyzone will be 20 years gone, so we'll be doing something. We have plans to get various other artists in the mix as well, I know Rizzle Kicks are interested and I have plans to get my nephew Will on a track somewhere in the album" The new Boyzone album, BZ20, was released in the summer of 2013. It featured ten new songs and ten re-recorded songs, with two singles. In September 2013, Keating teamed up with X Factor judge Dannii Minogue to record a duet of the Christmas song "Santa Claus Is Coming To Town" for department store chain Myer's "The Spirit of Christmas 2013" compilation.

=== 2016–2021: The Voice Australia, Time of My Life and Twenty Twenty ===
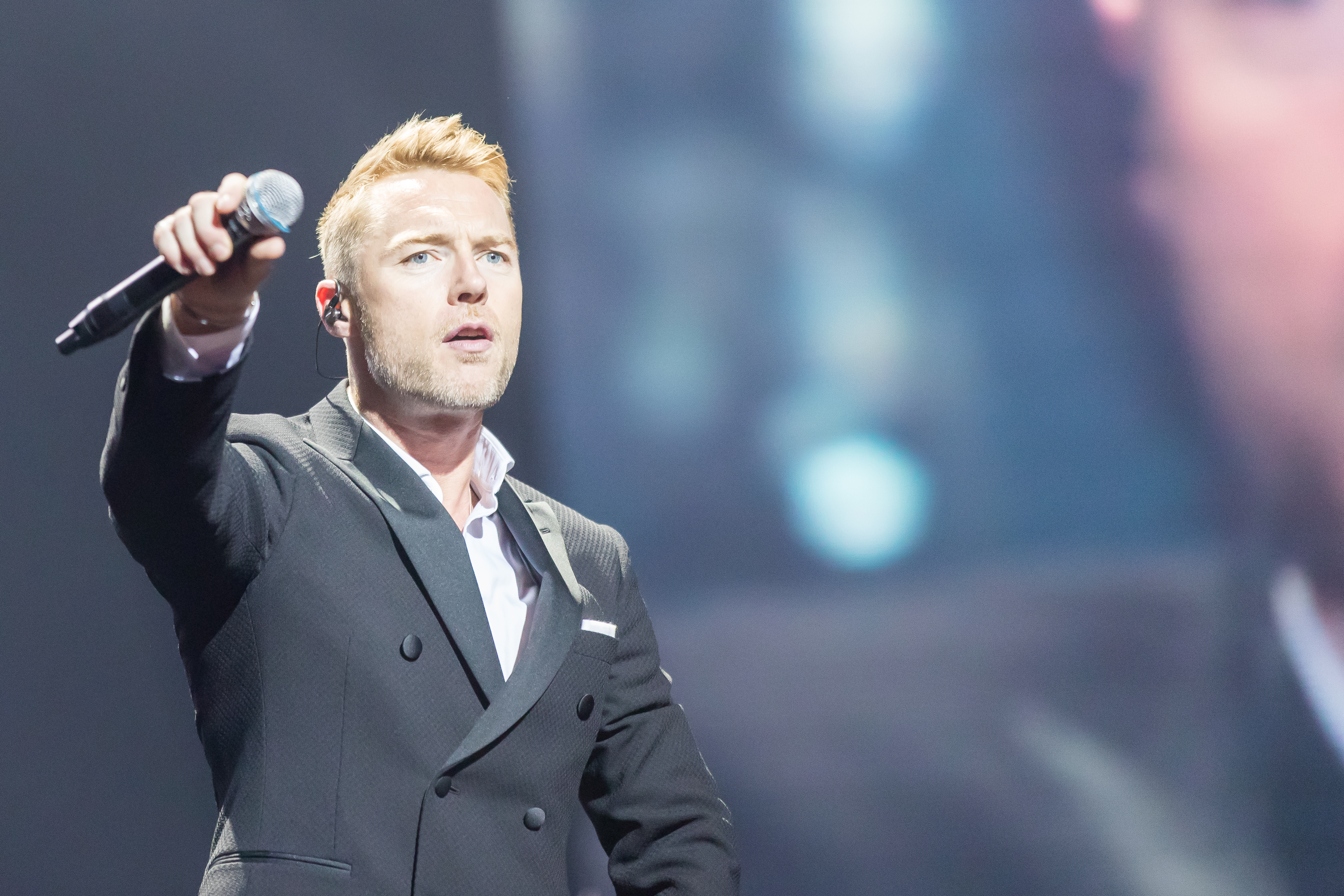
Keating performing in 2016

On 24 December 2015, Keating was announced as Ricky Martin's replacement on The Voice Australia. Keating joined Jessie J, Delta Goodrem and The Madden Brothers on the show. On 7 December 2016, Keating announced his departure from the show after one season. He was replaced by Kelly Rowland. Keating released his tenth studio album Time of My Life in February 2016. The single "Let Me Love You" charted at number 95.

In February 2020, Keating announced the release of his eleventh studio album titled, Twenty Twenty. It was released on 24 July 2020. The single "One of A Kind" charted at number 17. In December 2020, comedian Leigh Francis recorded a version of the Band Aid song "Do They Know It's Christmas?" for charity (with proceeds raising money for The Trussell Trust, Crisis, UNICEF, Shelter and Samaritans), which included Keating alongside Francis's Keith Lemon character, Pixie Lott, Rick Astley and Matt Goss amongst others.

On 21 December 2020, a new version of the charity Christmas number one contender "Don't Stop Me Eatin'" by LadBaby was released which featured Ronan Keating performing the song with 'LadBabyMum' Roxanne Hoyle (a single also raising money for The Trussell Trust). In November 2021, Keating released Songs from Home, a set to pay homage to his homeland of Ireland.

=== 2022–present: Various appearances on The Voice franchise ===
In December 2022, Keating was featured as a coach on the sixth series of The Voice Kids UK. He returned as a coach for the seventh series in July 2023. In June 2023, it was revealed that Keating would be a coach on the thirteenth season of The Voice of Germany which began airing in September. In January 2025, it was revealed that Keating would return to The Voice Australia for its fourteenth season after a nine-season hiatus, as a replacement to Adam Lambert, alongside Melanie C, Richard Marx and returning coach Kate Miller-Heidke. On 31 December 2025, Keating's show Ronan Keating and Friends: A New Year's Eve Party aired at 11.30pm on BBC One, in celebration of New Year's Eve. His guests included Boyzone bandmates Keith Duffy and Shane Lynch, and singers Louise and Calum Scott and actress-singer Shona McGarty.

== Awards ==
Over the years he has won Smash Hits Best Solo Male. He was given a tree in London's Hyde Park for performing for The Prince's Trust. He also has a World Music Award for the best-selling Irish artist. In 2024, he received an Europäische Kulturpräis for his charity work.

== Other work ==
=== Presenting ===
On 3 May 1997, Keating presented the Eurovision Song Contest along with Carrie Crowley. He presented the MTV Europe Music Awards in 1997 and 1999, and co-presented the MTV Asia Awards in 2002 with Mandy Moore. He also hosted Miss World 1998. That same year, Keating co-hosted the Royal Variety Performance alongside Ulrika Jonsson at the Lyceum Theatre in London.

In 1999, Keating presented all nine episodes of the BBC1 talent show Get Your Act Together.

On 20 April 2009, Keating guest co-hosted The Morning Show in Australia alongside Kylie Gillies, while the show's regular male co-host Larry Emdur was on holiday. In addition, he has stood in for Steve Wright on his Sunday Love Songs on BBC Radio 2. He presented a Sunday request show on Magic 105.4 FM.

In a section for the Jeremy Clarkson 2009 DVD Duel, Keating was invited to take part in an off-road race to find "the fastest off-road celebrity", along with newsreader Kate Silverton, Rugby player Matt Dawson, and Clarkson. He came third overall, after being forced to abandon the car with only 20 seconds left to complete the course to disarm the on-board time bomb.

In 2010, Keating became a judge and mentor on the Australian version of The X Factor for John Reid's replacement, joining Guy Sebastian, Natalie Imbruglia, and Kyle Sandilands for the second season of the show. During the second season, Keating mentored the Over 25s category and his fellow Boyzone band members helped him in the judges' house selection of the contest. He eventually became the winning mentor with his contestant Altiyan Childs. Keating went on to mentor the Groups for two consecutive years, notably with The Collective bren the last contestant eliminated in the fourth season. For the fifth season, he was assigned the Boys category and made series history; both his contestants, Taylor Henderson and Jai Waetford, reached the grand-finals and finished runner-up and been the last contestant eliminated respectively. On the sixth season, Keating became the winning mentor for a second time with Marlisa Punzalan, the youngest contestant and first contestant from the Girls category to win. On 25 April 2015, it was announced that Keating would not be returning for the seventh season of The X Factor and replaced by James Blunt.

On Christmas Eve 2015, during the broadcast of Carols by Candlelight on Channel 9 Australia, it was announced that Keating would be returning to Australian TV screens in 2016 as a coach on the fifth season of The Voice Australia, joining other coaches Jessie J, Delta Goodrem and The Madden Brothers.

In June 2015, he filled in as a guest anchor on the morning slot of UK radio station Magic FM.

In September 2017, Keating was signed to co-host Magic Breakfast alongside Harriet Scott on Magic Radio running Monday to Friday, 6 am till 10 am. Keating also presented his own show on Saturday evenings 5pm till 7pm with Disney+.

From 2017 to 2021, Keating guest-presented episodes of The One Show, before becoming a main presenter in May 2021.

On 19 November 2020, Keating was a guest panellist on the ITV Daytime show, Loose Women, and made history as being part of the first all-male panel in the show's 21-year history.

Keating was a judge on The Voice Kids UK in 2022 and 2023 for seasons 6 and 7. Keating joined The Voice of Germany in 2023 for season 13.

=== Acting ===
Keating unsuccessfully auditioned for a role in The Hobbit. The film is based on the J. R. R. Tolkien novel of the same name.

In April 2011, Keating began working on Goddess, a 2013 romantic comedy film co-starring British actress Laura Michelle Kelly. In May 2014, Keating provided the singing voice of Postman Pat in the film Postman Pat: The Movie.

In November 2014, he took over the part of 'Guy' in Once from David Hunter, at the Phoenix Theatre in London's West End, performing the role until March 2015. He was the fourth principal 'Guy' in the West End production, and the first Irishman to have played the role since Glen Hansard in the Oscar-winning original film, on which the musical is based. His performances in Once received positive reviews from critics.

In 2017, Keating starred alongside Jessica Marais in the fourth season of the Australian drama, Love Child. The same year, he also starred as Harold Le Druillenec, brother of Louisa Gould in the film Another Mother's Son, based on a true story from the German occupation of the Channel Islands.

=== Charity work ===
In October 2005, shortly after joining Christian Aid and the Trade Justice Campaign in 2004, Keating went to Rome where he was appointed as a UN Goodwill Ambassador via the Food and Agricultural Organisation.

Keating ran in the London Marathon on 13 April 2008 to raise money for Cancer Research. He has also walked the length of Ireland twice, each time raising money for the Marie Keating Foundation, now linked to Cancer Research in the UK.

In 2009, Keating climbed Mount Kilimanjaro to raise money for Comic Relief; joining him were Gary Barlow, Chris Moyles, Ben Shephard, Kimberley Walsh, Denise van Outen, Fearne Cotton, Alesha Dixon and Cheryl Cole.

In June 2009, Keating received a Special Achievement Award from Cancer Research UK – he was singled out for his work with them since 2006. He, along with the Marie Keating Charity, has helped to raise over £1.7 million for the UK charity. This money is used to fund three special mobile units which raise awareness throughout the UK.

In October 2009, he pulled out of the Chicago Marathon due to the sudden death of his bandmate Stephen Gately; he had intended to run in memory of his mother.

In September 2011, he swam the Irish sea 90 km stretch from Dublin to Holyhead with a team of celebrities to raise money for cancer charities and set a new Guinness World Record for open water swimming with an 11-member celebrity team. They raised £1 million for Cancer Research Britain and the Marie Keating Foundation.

== Feud with Louis Walsh ==
When Keating announced he wanted to take a break from Boyzone, Louis Walsh continued to manage his career. Keating achieved a number one hit with "Life is a Rollercoaster" in 2000 while his album sold 4.4 million copies. Keating and Walsh later agreed to part company and then had a bitter falling out. Walsh told the press: "[Keating] wasn't the most talented one – he's not a great singer and he's got no personality." Keating later told Closer magazine: "That man absolutely tried to ruin me and if he thinks we can ever hug and make up he can forget it. I haven't heard from him in three years and I wouldn't have a problem if I never saw him again. He's not a nice character."

The feud between the two men had apparently ended by March 2008, after which Keating helped in selecting the finalists in the groups category in The X Factor. However, by the time Boyzone celebrated their 20th anniversary in 2013, Walsh had stopped managing the group, claiming his tenure as manager had ended "badly".

== Personal life ==
In April 1998, Keating married Yvonne Connolly. Together, they have three children: a son Jack, born in 1999 and daughters Marie (known as "Missy") and Ali born in 2001 and 2007. In 2009, Keating had a seven-month affair with Boyzone back-up dancer Francine Cornell which resulted in Keating and Connolly separating in 2010; their divorce was finalised in March 2015.

He met his Australian second wife Storm Uechtritz in August 2010 and married her on 17 August 2015. Their son Cooper Archer Keating was born on 26 April 2017. In November 2019, they revealed they were expecting their second child together. Their daughter Coco Knox Keating was born on 27 March 2020.

In 2022, Keating's son Jack appeared on British reality television show Love Island. He again returned to the show in 2026.

On 10 March 2023, Keating became a grandfather for the first time at the age of 46, when his 23-year-old son Jack announced on his Instagram account that he had become the father of a baby girl.

In July 2023, Keating's older brother, Ciaran, was killed in a car crash in County Mayo. Ciaran's son Ruairí Keating (Ronan's nephew) is a professional footballer.

== Discography ==
- Ronan (2000)
- Destination (2002)
- Turn It On (2003)
- Bring You Home (2006)
- Songs for My Mother (2009)
- Winter Songs (2009)
- Duet (2010)
- When Ronan Met Burt (2011)
- Fires (2012)
- Time of My Life (2016)
- Twenty Twenty (2020)
- Songs from Home (2021)

== Filmography ==
- Goddess (2013) – James Dickens
- Postman Pat: The Movie (2014) – Roman, Pat Clifton (singing voice)
- Another Mother's Son (2017) – Harold Le Druillenec
- Love Child (2017) – Lawrence Faber
- PAW Patrol: The Movie (2021) – Harris (UK dub)

== Tours ==
- Ronan Tour (2000-2001)
- The Destination Tour (2002-2003)
- The Turn It On Tour (2004)
- The Bring You Home Tour (2006)
- The Songs for My Mother Tour (2009-2010)
- Australian Tour 2010 (2010)
- The Fires Tour (2012-2013)
- The Time of My Life Tour (2016)
- All the Hits Tour (2022)
- Live in Germany (2024-2025)
- Just Getting Started World Tour (2027)

== See also ==
- List of Eurovision Song Contest presenters

Preceded by Robbie Williams; Jenny McCarthy	MTV Europe Music Awards host 1997; 1999	Succeeded by Jenny McCarthy; Wyclef Jean
Preceded by Morten Harket & Ingvild Bryn	Eurovision Song Contest presenter (with Carrie Crowley); 1997	Succeeded by Terry Wogan & Ulrika Jonsson
