= Johnny Duhan =

Irish singer-songwriter (1950–2024)

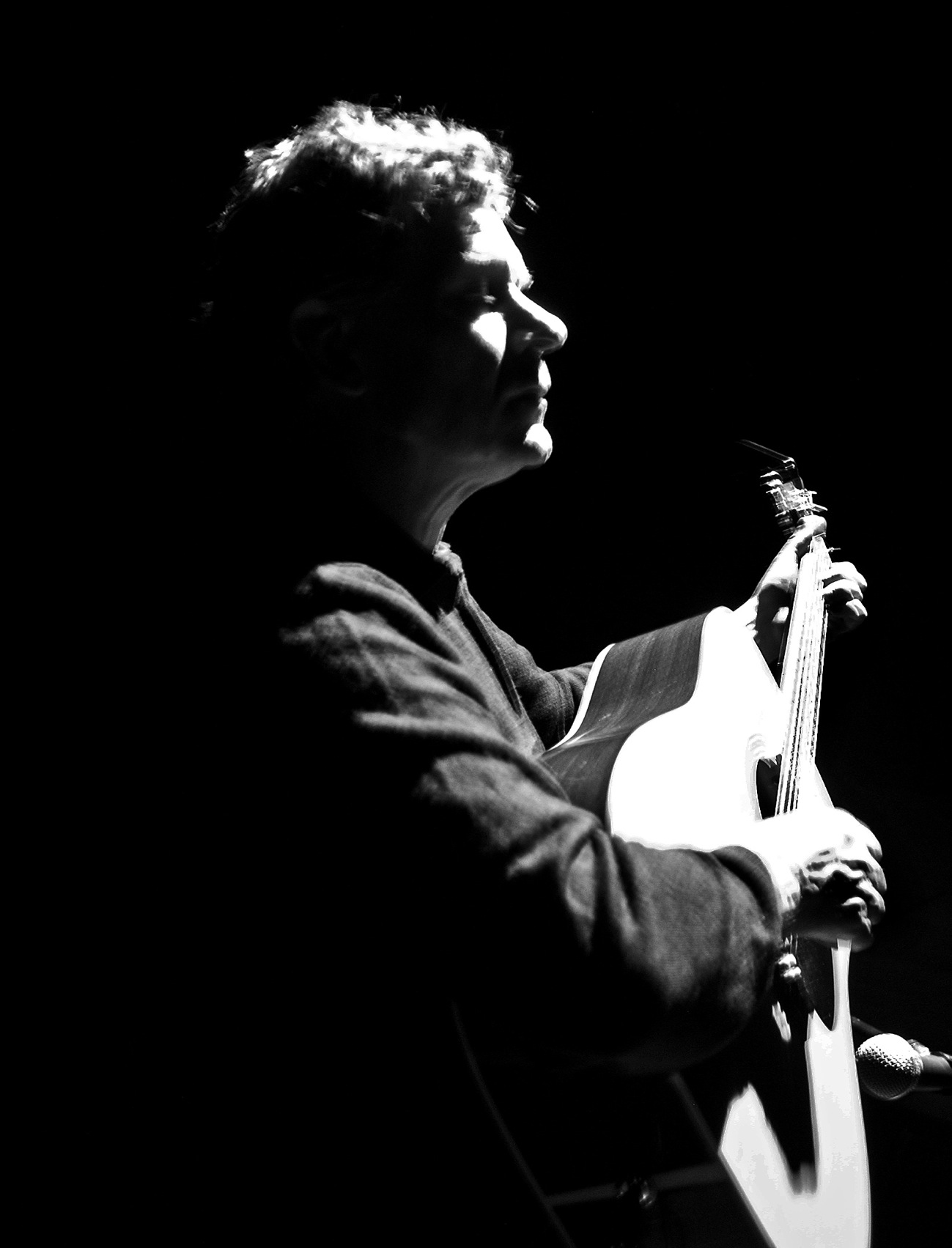
- Duhan in 2006

Background information
- Born: 30 March 1950
- Origin: Limerick, County Limerick, Ireland
- Died: 12 November 2024 (aged 74) County Galway, Ireland
- Genres: Folk
- Occupations: Musician; songwriter
- Instruments: Vocals; guitar
- Years active: 1966–2024
- Formerly of: Granny's Intentions
- Website: johnnyduhan.com

Johnny Duhan (30 March 1950 – 12 November 2024) was an Irish singer-songwriter. He started his career as the 15-year-old frontman of the Irish beat group Granny's Intentions. After success in Limerick and Dublin, the band moved to London and was signed to the Deram Records record label. The band released several singles and one album, Honest Injun. However, the band disbanded before Duhan was twenty-one. Duhan left the music industry to start writing folk songs, poetry, and prose.

Just Another Town, To the Light, Flame, and "The Voyage" are some of his work. These align with the first four sections of his poetic autobiography, To the Light. His songs have been performed by Christy Moore, the Dubliners, Mary Black, and other Irish and international singers. Christy Moore stated that his song "The Voyage" has been performed at over a million weddings worldwide.

On 12 November 2024, Duhan drowned off the coast of County Galway. He was 74.

== Discography ==
- Flame (1996)
- Tree (2002)
- The Voyage (2005)
- Just Another Town (2007)
- To the Light (2008)
- The Burning Word (2010)
- Winter (2012)
- Highlights (2014)
- Creation (2015)

== Books ==
- There Is a Time (Brandon Books, 2001) ISBN 978-0-86322-283-2
- The Voyage – Johnny Duhan Songbook (Waltons Publishers, 2003) ISBN 1-85720-151-5
- To the Light (Bell Productions, 2009) ISBN 978-0-9555106-1-8
