= Storm Keating =

Australian media personality (born 1982)

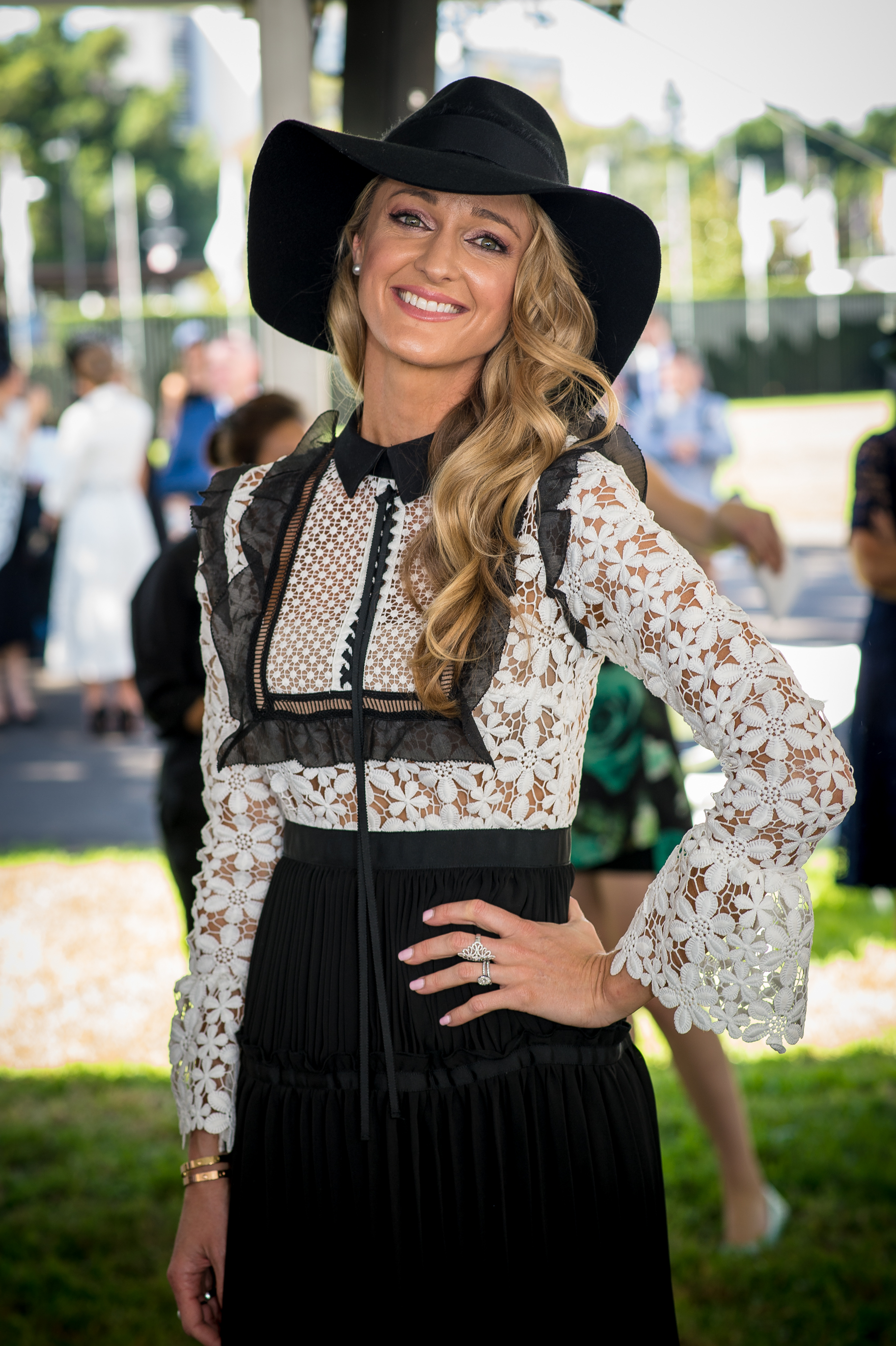
- Keating in 2016
- Born: Sharyn Storm Uechtritz; 27 October 1982 (age 44); Childers, Queensland, Australia
- Education: University of Queensland; University of California, Los Angeles
- Spouses: Tim Ivers (m. 2009; div. 2012); Ronan Keating (m. 2015)
- Children: 2

Storm Uechtritz Keating (née Uechtritz; born 27 October 1982) is an Australian brand ambassador, television producer/ director, media personality and business woman. She has worked on a number of Australian and British television programmes such as The Apprentice Australia, Masterchef Australia, The X Factor, The Voice Australia, and The Voice UK.

== Early life and education ==
Sharyn Storm Uechtritz was born in Childers, Queensland, Australia, the daughter of Gordon Charles Uechtritz, a cattleman, and Debra Lynn (née Hastings), also known as Sharni Ra'harni, a business consultant, healer and Reiki practitioner. She was named after a character from Wilbur Smith's Courtney Novels. She is of German, Danish, Samoan, and English descent.

She grew up in a small village in Papua New Guinea, before her family relocated to a cattle property in Australia in 1988. She has three older brothers.

After school, she attended the University of Queensland (Australia) for three years; she received an international exchange scholarship to study at University of California, Los Angeles in 2003, for the final year of her degree.

== Career ==
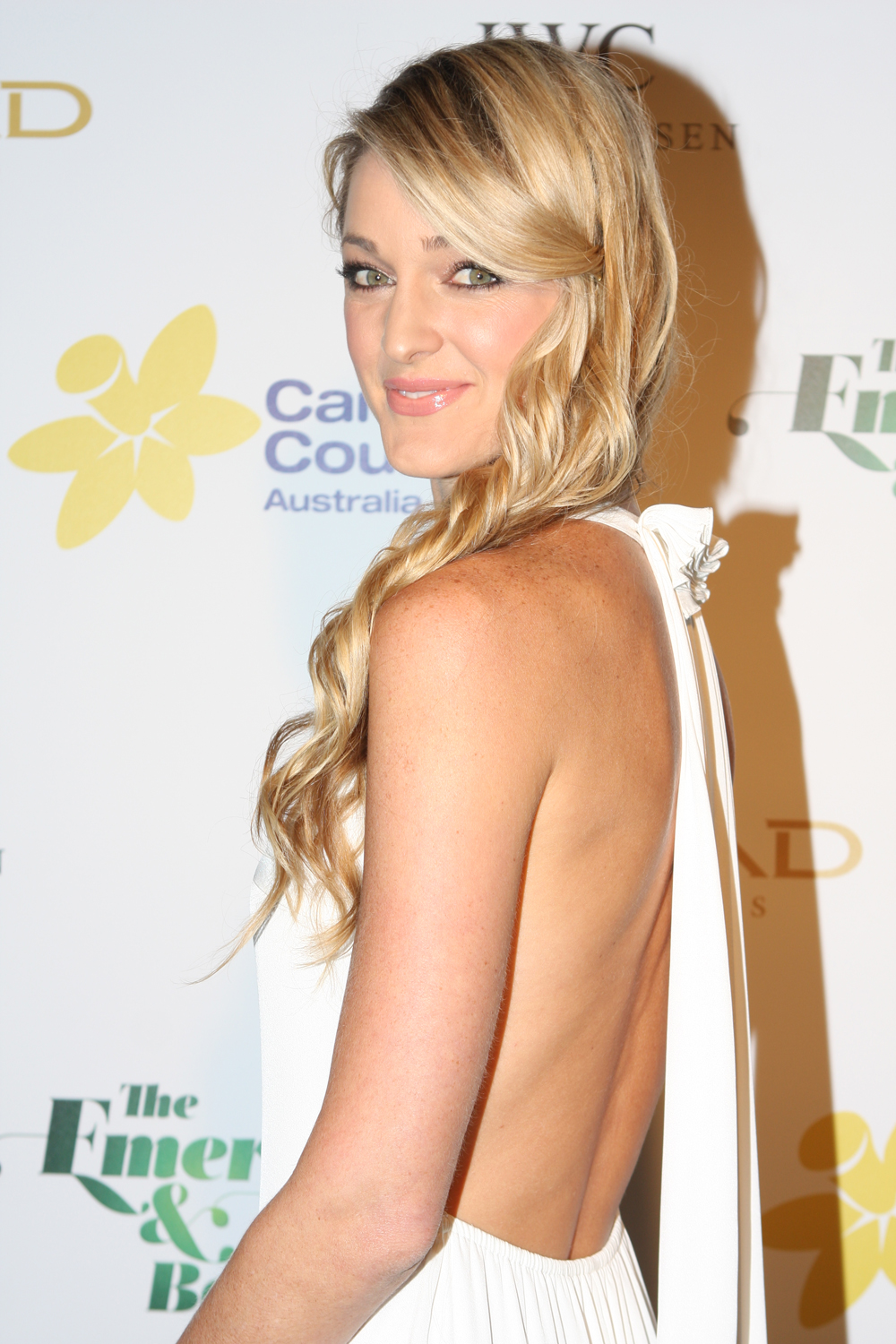
Storm Keating in 2012

During her time at the University of California Los Angeles, Keating interned at HBO in the Original Programming Department under Chris Albrecht. It was upon her return to Australia that she began her career in television production at Channel Nine in Sydney.

In 2009, Keating worked on the production of the Australian version of NBC's The Apprentice. From 2010 to 2012, she worked on shows such as The X Factor, Masterchef, and The Voice. In 2012, she moved to London where she became the producer-director of The Voice UK.

Keating collaborated on a range of boots with Italian bootmaker, Stivaleria Cavallin. Called the "Storm Boots", these were launched in February 2015 at the Burberry show during London Fashion Week. In October 2015, Keating was announced as brand ambassador for Positive Luxury, a London-based company which awards luxury brands that meet sustainability and ethical business criteria.

Keating maintained a fashion and lifestyle blog in 2016 and 2017.

== Personal life ==
Keating (then known by her maiden name, Uechtritz) married Tim Ivers in August 2009. They had met while she was studying at the University of Queensland. Their marriage ended in April 2012.

In August 2010, she met Ronan Keating on the Australian The X-Factor show. She married him on 17 August 2015 and began using his surname after their marriage. They have two children, a son born in 2017 and a daughter born in 2020.

== Filmography ==
Year	Title	Role
2009	The Apprentice Australia	Associate producer
2010	So You Think You Can Dance Australia	Producer
2010	The X Factor	Producer
2011	MasterChef Australia	Producer
2011	Junior MasterChef Australia	Producer
2012	The Voice AU	Producer
2013	The Voice UK	Producer director
2021	Loose Women	Panelist
