= Just Another Town =

Studio album by Johnny Duhan
- Released: 1992
- Genre: Folk

Just Another Town is an album by Irish folk singer Johnny Duhan, originally released 21 September 1992 in Ireland, re-released on CD on 31 March 2007.

== Track listing ==
1. "Another Morning"
2. "Always Remember"
3. "In the Garden"
4. "Just Another Town"
5. "Daredevil"
6. "Let's Just Have Another Drink"
7. "Benediction"
8. "Mary"
9. "Two Minds"
10. "Stowaway"
11. "This Time"
12. "One Hundred Miles"
13. "The River Shannon"
14. "Margaret"
15. "Young Mother"
16. "Everything Will Be Alright"
17. "A Winter's Night"
