= Voyagers (Charlton novel) =

2026 novel by Meg Charlton

- First edition cover
- Author: Meg Charlton
- Cover artist: Milan Božić
- Language: English
- Genres: Science fiction; literary fiction
- Publisher: HarperCollins
- Publication date: June 16, 2026
- Publication place: United States
- Media type: Hardcover
- Pages: 320
- ISBN: 978-0-06-344121-7

Voyagers is a 2026 literary science fiction novel by American writer Meg Charlton. It is her debut novel and was first published in the United States in June 2026 by HarperCollins. The novel is set in the United States, and is about two six-year-old children who mysteriously disappear for 36 hours. They have no memory of what happened to them, but speculation grows that they were abducted by aliens.

== Background ==
Charlton said the idea for Voyagers grew out of an assignment she did for Vice News at a 2016 UFO convention at Roswell. After listening to people's experiences, she starting thinking about what it must be like to be part of a community that society generally frowns upon, and "what it means to tell stories about ourselves, what it means to trust ourselves". She wondered what it must be like for a child to grow up with these experiences that they take very seriously. Charlton said she wanted to explore the reliability of memory, and how people tend to create narratives that help them make sense of these experiences. "[W]e can tell whatever story we want [about ourselves] and at the end of the day still get it wrong. On some level, no one can really see the truth." She said she also wanted to show that telling your story makes "a private experience ... public and how that ensuing celebrity can estrange you from your own experience and start to affect the way that you talk about your own experience."

For research, Charlton stated that being an ufology outsider, she focused on books by other outsiders on ufo-related topics, for example Abduction: Human Encounters with Aliens by professor of psychiatry, John E. Mack, and American Cosmic: UFOs, Religion, Technology by professor of religious studies, Diana Walsh Pasulka. She said she also read books on conspiracy culture and paranoia, and individual and collective memory. For Alex and Ana's relationship, Charlton referenced J. D. Salinger's Franny and Zooey and Lila and Lenú from Elena Ferrante's Neapolitan Novels.

Charlton stated that Allen is an imaginary alien created by Alex and Ana to put a face to the creature that may have taken them. It is the youngsters' "inside joke" and not part of their public story. But, depending on how the novel's ending is interpretated, Allen could also be a real alien. Charlton explained that she "wanted the ending to feel alien in a way, like to have it feel resolved, but still mysterious".

Charlton said that Voyagers began in early 2021 when she presented her agent with a "verbal pitch" of the story. The agent expressed interest, but Charlton said it took two years before she was ready to submit the first eighty pages of a draft. Her agent was impressed and signed her in 2023. While happy with the development, Charlton noted, "The awful truth of signing on a partial is that you still have to finish the book." That took her another two years before it was ready for publication.

== Cover ==
Charlton said that during the time she spent writing Voyagers, she collected an assortment of pictures that motivated her to keep writing. The theme common to all the images was "a tension between awe and intimacy. They managed to feel mysterious but never sinister." Charlton presented ideas for the book cover to her publisher, and was surprised how accommodating they were. She said she worked with Milan Božić on the design of the cover, and was very happy with the final result.

Charlton explained the book's cover:

The two figures on the cover are stand ins for the protagonists, Alex and Ana. The Joshua Trees reflect the setting for the novel’s inciting incident and ... its climax. But my favorite part of the cover is the negative space of the night sky and the unknown glow on the horizon. I wanted the cover to leave space for speculation — is it an alien craft behind those clouds or just the light of the moon? — and put the reader in the same headspace as the characters.

== Plot summary ==
While on vacation in Palm Springs, California with their respective parents, two six-year-olds, Alex and Ana disappear for 36 hours. When they return, they have no memory of what had happened to them, but the media covering the story speculates that they were abducted by aliens. The children, looking for answers, assume that they were abducted and become close friends. They create "Allen", an imaginary alien they pretend took them, and joke about how he spends his time.

The media turns the children into minor celebrities, and they appear on TV shows. Ana embraces the attention they are receiving, and does not question the media speculation about what happened to them. But Alex shies away from the attention, and starts to wonder what really happened. By the time they are teenagers, Ana is regularly appearing on TV, and features in a TV sitcom, while Alex distances himself from her. Their differing opinions about what happened to them severs their friendship.

In the present, and now adults, Alex is a lawyer and Ana a professional "experiencer advocate" helping those who have experienced contact with aliens. Meanwhile, a signal has been detected from the outer Solar System, for which no government claims responsibility. Some believe the "Signal" is a rogue AI, but the general consensus is that it is alien, and that first contact is imminent. As the source of the Signal approaches Earth, satellites begin to malfunction, planes are grounded, and electronic devices freeze, which creates global panic. Amidst the chaos, Alex realizes that he wants to be with Ana, and meets up with her at a retreat she runs in Palm Springs. Alex and Ana visit Major Williams who lives nearby hoping he can explain what happened to them. Williams, now retired, was in the United States Marine Corps, and was one of the first officials to interview them immediately after their disappearance. He had initially stated that he believed the children were abducted, but later recanted his statement.

== Critical reception ==
In a review in SFX magazine, Rhian Drinkwater called Voyagers "a quiet, introspective tale of friendship and development. And possibly aliens." He wrote that "[m]emory is a tricky thing" and asked the question: "Just who are we if our memories can’t be trusted?" Drinkwater gave Charlton's book four stars out of five. Writing in the Financial Times, James Lovegrove described Voyagers as a "meditative [and] intriguing ... first contact story", but added that it is also about "mythologising, childhood trauma, and the reliability of memory." Meagan Shay described Voyagers as "a blend of sci-fi and literary fiction" that "gives depth" to familiar alien abduction themes. In a review in Library Journal, Shay stated that Charlton's debut novel is written "with the elegant prose, cohesive plotlines, and believable characters of a seasoned author."

Kirkus Reviews noted that aliens can be "tricky subject matter", and "in lesser hands", this book could have been "a schlocky story" about humans confronting the unknown. But the reviewer stated that in Voyagers, "Charlton strikes just the right notes of smarts and warmth, and the result is an uncommonly confident debut novel." A reviewer in Publishers Weekly described Voyagers as a "satisfying deep dive into the worlds of ufology and child stardom". They said it was "well-researched and [puts a] deeply introspective spin on a familiar alien abduction scenario."
