= USS Voyager (SP-361) =

Patrol vessel of the United States Navy

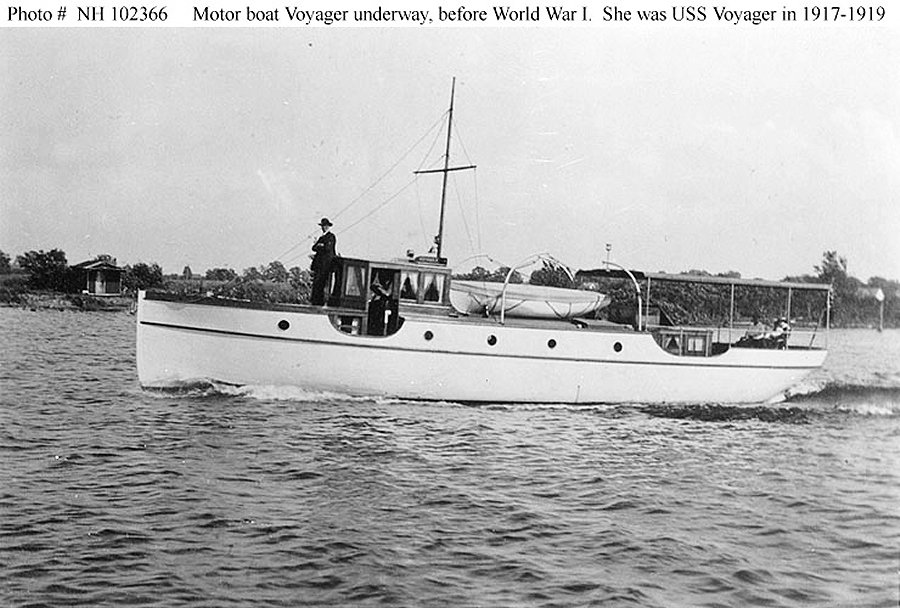

History

United States
- Name: USS Voyager
- Builder: Defoe Boat and Motor Works, Bay City, Michigan
- Acquired: July 1917
- Commissioned: 25 July 1917
- Decommissioned: 13 May 1919
- Stricken: 13 May 1919
- Fate: Transferred to United States Coast Guard, 15 September 1919
- Name: USCGC Voyager
- Acquired: 15 September 1919
- Commissioned: 13 April 1921
- Decommissioned: circa 1936
- Renamed: AB-18, 6 November 1923
- Fate: scrapped in 1944

General characteristics
- Type: Patrol boat
- Tonnage: 35 long tons (36 t) gross
- Length: 52 ft (16 m)
- Beam: 10 ft 6 in (3.20 m)
- Draft: 4 ft (1.2 m)
- Speed: 9.5 knots (17.6 km/h; 10.9 mph)
- Complement: 9

USS Voyager (SP-361) was a wooden-hulled motorboat of the United States Navy. She was built at Bay City, Michigan, by the Defoe Boat and Motor Works company, was acquired by the Navy from H. J. Defoe in July 1917.

Although listed in the 1918 edition of Ship's Data: U.S. Naval Vessels as being delivered and commissioned on 25 July 1917, Voyager's extant logs do not begin until on 1 September 1917. Nevertheless, they indicate that the first men actually reported on board for duty as early as on 13 July 1917, 12 days before the delivery/commissioning date given in the Ship's Data: U.S. Naval Vessels for 1918.

== Service history ==
=== U.S. Navy service ===
Attached to the 9th, 10th, and 11th Naval District local patrol forces and based at Sault Ste. Marie, Michigan, for the duration of World War I, Voyager operated actively on the Great Lakes until winter ice stopped navigation. Her first recorded duty in September appears to have been standing off a navigable channel off Pipe Island, guarding the wreck of the U.S. Steel Corporation boat Mitchell, which was apparently blocking part of the channel.

Voyager operated out of Sault Ste. Marie into mid-November 1917 before she shifted to Detroit, Michigan, in company with the old gunboat Isla de Luzon. She was subsequently placed out of service between 18 and 21 November, and was decommissioned "for the season" on the 23rd. She remained inactive until on 8 May 1918, when she was ordered to return to Sault Ste. Marie. Departing on that day, Voyager set out in company with Isla de Luzon, Avis, Mikawe, Dicky, and Raboco.

Rough weather during the first night of the voyage forced Voyager to drag anchor and run aground, but she was pulled off soon thereafter. Her motor broke down on 11 May, however, necessitating the SP boat's being towed back to her home port of Sault Ste. Marie. Voyager operated out of that Michigan port through the armistice of World War I on 11 November 1918, and was decommissioned on 13 May 1919. Simultaneously struck from the Navy List, Voyager was turned over to the Treasury Department for use by the United States Coast Guard at Chicago, Illinois, on 15 September 1919.

=== U.S. Coast Guard service ===
Voyager operated out of Chicago until late in 1922, when she was shifted back to her former home port, Sault Ste. Marie. On 6 November 1923, the erstwhile patrol craft lost her name and became simply AB-18. Classified as a harbor patrol cutter, she served in that capacity into the late 1930s. After 1936, her name disappeared from Coast Guard ship registers.

She was purchased privately in 1936, and operated as the fishing vessel Marley Grace on Lake Superior until 1944, when she was scrapped by her owner.
