= The Voyage (song) =

Song by Johnny Duhan

"The Voyage" is a song by Irish singer-songwriter Johnny Duhan. Duhan first offered it to the Irish singer Christy Moore, whose 1989 recording became the most well-known version of the song. Duhan went on to record his own version for his similarly titled album The Voyage that was released much later in 2005. The song has been interpreted by numerous artists and translated into other languages.

The inspiration for the song came from Duhan's earlier excavations of family history. He compared the early struggles of his marriage to that of his parents, and wrote a song called "Trying to Get the Balance Right" which led on to reflections on the institution of marriage and child rearing, and he wrote "The Voyage" about positive aspects of marriage.

== Christy Moore version ==
In 1989, the first of many covers of the song "The Voyage" was made by Irish singer Christy Moore. Moore's version has been a regular feature of the folk section of the iTunes download charts.

== Impact ==
Niall Stokes of Hot Press magazine has predicted that "The Voyage" will be around long after most popular rock songs are long forgotten. Similarly, Moore has described the song as a folk standard. He has stated that "The Voyage" has been performed more than a million weddings worldwide.

== Other versions ==
The song has been recorded by Celtic Thunder (2008), Donna Taggart (2011), and Lee Matthews (2014). The John Smith Band (2023)
