= École des Voyageurs =

Location
- 8736-216th Street; Langley, British Columbia, V1M 2X9; Canada
- Coordinates: 49.16117°N 122.62357°W

Information
- School type: Public, Elementary school
- School board: Conseil scolaire francophone de la Colombie-Britannique
- School number: 9335028
- Staff: 12
- Grades: K-7
- Enrollment: 122 (September 2024)
- Language: French
- Website: voyageurs.csf.bc.ca
- Last updated: May 29, 2006

École des Voyageurs is a French first language elementary school located in Langley, British Columbia, Canada. It serves the French population of the Greater Vancouver Regional District.

== Student exchange ==
In 2007, a number of students from the 6th and 7th grade participated in the national SEVEC student exchange programme. The twin school for the exchange was École François-Perrot in Île Perrot, Quebec.
