= USC&GS Mikawe =

Patrol vessel of the United States Navy

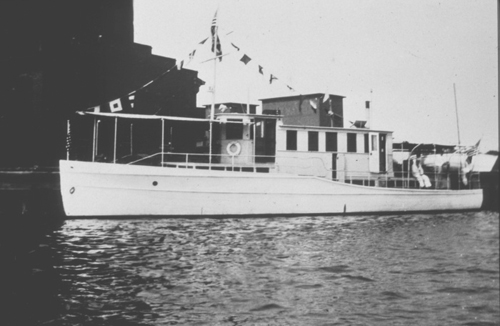
- USC&GS Mikawe at Norfolk, Virginia on 4 July 1928, dressed overall for Independence Day.

History

United States
- Name: Mikawe (1916-1917); USS Mikawe (SP-309) (1917-1919); USC&GS Mikawe (1919-1939)
- Namesake: Previous name retained
- Builder: Defoe Boat and Motor Works, Bay City, Michigan
- Completed: 1916
- Acquired: 24 April 1919
- Commissioned: 1920
- Fate: Destroyed by fire 27 October 1939

General characteristics
- Type: Launch
- Length: 64.5 ft (19.7 m)
- Beam: 14 ft (4.3 m)
- Draft: 5.5 ft (1.7 m)
- Installed power: 75 hp (56 kW) Gasoline engine
- Propulsion: Gasoline engine
- Speed: 11.6 knots
- Armament: 2 × 1-pounder guns; 2 × machine guns

USC&GS Mikawe was a United States Coast and Geodetic Survey launch in commission from 1920 to 1939.

Mikawe was built as a civilian wooden-hulled motorboat of the same name in 1916 by Defoe Boat and Motor Works at Bay City, Michigan. From 1917 to 1919, she served in the United States Navy was an armed motorboat used as the patrol vessel and called USS Mikawe (SP-309). The U.S. Navy purchased her from her owner, Thomas H. Gill, for $12,500 (USD) on 10 August 1917 for World War I service and commissioned her on the same day. Assigned to the 9th Naval District—at the time a part of the single administrative entity known as the 9th, 10th, and 11th Naval Districts -- Mikawe served as a section patrol boat on the Great Lakes for the rest of World War I.

On 24 April 1919, (Note: The NOAA History Web site claims she was acquired from the Navy sometime in 1920; presumably the NOAA site is confusing her transfer date with the date on which she entered Coast and Geodetic Survey service.) Mikawe was transferred to the Coast and Geodetic Survey. Placed in service in 1920, she served along the United States East Coast during her Survey career. In the late 1920s, she served as a training ship for Coast and Geodetic Survey deck officers.

Mikawe was destroyed by fire while taking on gasoline on 27 October 1939 in Norfolk, Virginia. Clement A. Bennett was killed with Lieutenant Max G. Ricketts, Anon J. Small, William D. Bennett, Elton E. Mooney, and Issac R. Jones being seriously injured.
