= Castle Hill Roman villa =

The Castle Hill Roman villa has been described as "the largest and most sophisticated villa complex known in Suffolk".

Under what is now housing in Tranmere Grove and Chesterfield Drive in the old village of Whitton (now a suburb of Ipswich) lies the remains of a Roman villa. It was first excavated in 1931. It was excavated again in 1949 by the archaeologist Basil Brown before residential building started. Coins were found along with a mosaic floor which is on display in Ipswich Museum.

It featured on Channel 4's archaeological television programme Time Team in 2004. The dig helped provide more evidence to supplement that gathered in the 1949 dig.
