= Westbourne, Suffolk =

Suburb of Ipswich, Suffolk, England

Coordinates: 52.069°N 1.132°E

Westbourne is a suburb of Ipswich, on the northwestern fringe of the town, in the Ipswich district, in the county of Suffolk, England. It borders the suburbs of Whitton and Castle Hill to the east and the villages of Bramford and Sproughton to the west. Whitehouse is a large estate occupying the northern part of the suburb. It is named after the West Bourne, a former stream and tributary of the River Gipping that ran east through the north of the suburb then south alongside Westbourne Road. It was diverted in the early twentieth century to supply the town with water. The former stream bed can still be seen on the eastern perimeter of the Bramford Lane Allotments and its waters can be heard flowing beneath the manhole covers on the site.

Westbourne Academy (formerly known as Westbourne High School and Westbourne Sports College) takes its name from the district. Westbourne Library in the south of the suburb was renamed Broomhill Library following consultation with local residents after the running of the county's libraries passed from Suffolk County Council to Suffolk Libraries in 2012. The Suffolk Punch is a public house in the area, a notable 'Tolly Folly', styled on the Tollemache stately home, Helmingham Hall. A number of artists and writers live in the district.
