= Pipers Vale =

Nature reserve in Suffolk, England

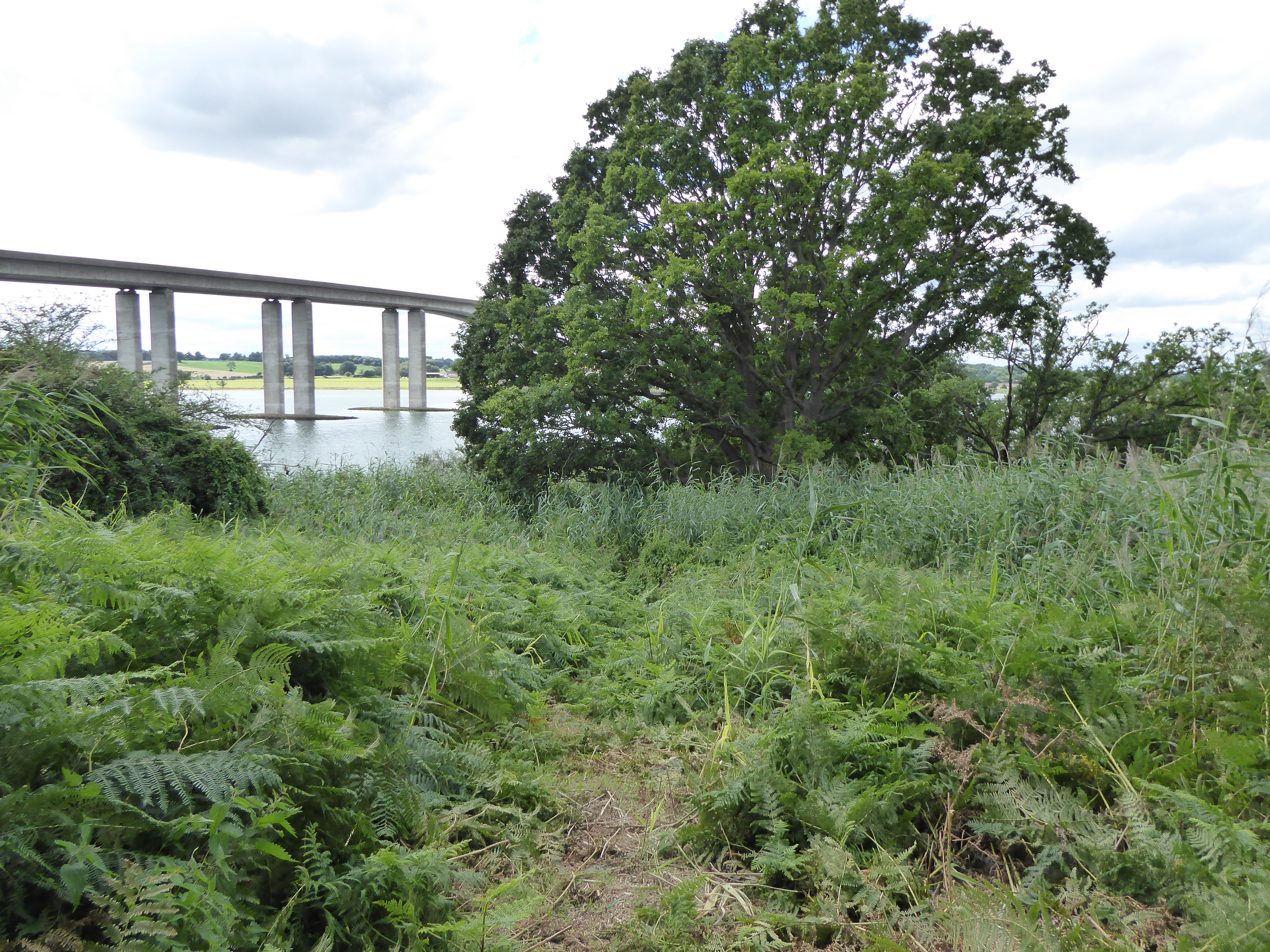
- Pipers Vale with the Orwell Bridge and River Orwell in the background
- Interactive map of Pipers Vale
- Type: Local Nature Reserve
- Location: Ipswich, Suffolk
- OS grid: TM 178 414
- Area: 19.7 hectares (49 acres)
- Manager: Ipswich Borough Council

Pipers Vale is a 19.7 hectare Local Nature Reserve on the southern outskirts of Ipswich in Suffolk. It is owned and managed by Ipswich Borough Council.

This site on the bank of the River Orwell is part of Orwell Country Park. Its diverse habitats include heath, reedbeds, scrub and alder carr. Over 100 bird species have been recorded here, including redwings, whimbrels and bullfinches.

There is access from Gainsborough Lane.

== Pipers Vale Pool ==
Pipers Vale Pool (52.0309°N 1.1706°E) was an outdoor swimming venue opened on 12 June 1937 and replaced the West End Bathing Place, which had closed in 1936 due to fears that it was polluting the River Orwell. The pool was designed by County-Borough's Engineer Edward McLauchlan and constructed at a cost of £8000.

The pool consisted of a main pool and a smaller paddling pool. The main pool was 40 yards (45.72m) long, 12.5 yards (11.43) wide and depths between 2 feet 6 inches (0.76m) to 9 feet (2.7m). The pool boasted a 1m spring board as well as a steel framed diving stage with 1m, 2m and 3m fixed diving boards. The paddling pool was 50 feet (15.24) long by 35 feet (10.66m) width. Access was via a long walk through Pipers Vale; locally known as The Lairs.

The pool overlooked the River Orwell. The site was very close to where the east side of the Orwell Bridge, which spans the River Orwell, begins.

The popularity of the pool prompted the construction of a further pool, Broomhill Swimming Pool, to serve the western side of the town.

Like the boilers of Broomhill Pool, Pipers Vale's boilers were removed as part of the WWII war effort.

The Piper's Vale Pool was demolished in 1979 as part of temporary road works through the area prior to the construction of the Orwell Bridge.

Areas amenities included sun-bathing beaches. In the first season much of the beach shingle at Pipers Vale soon found its way into the bottom of the pool tank and was not replicated for the following seasons. Other areas included a spectators' shelters, administration offices, 94 dressing cubicles (47 for ladies and 47 for gentlemen) and covered area with provision for up to 100 bicycles, a superintendent's office, a basket room for max. 450 baskets, plus a small buffet serving visitors to the pool and park. A wringer (mangle) was provided in each section to remove surplus water from costumes and towels.

The pool was in close reach of four new large housing estates (Racecourse Estate, Gainsborough Estate, Gloucester Estate and the Greenwich Estate), some 3000 houses and three recently constructed schools.
