= Crown Pools =

Coordinates: 52.0599°N 1.1538°E

Crown Pool
- Interactive map of Crown Pool
- Location: Crown Street, Ipswich, Suffolk, Crown Street, IP1 3JA

Construction
- Opened: 1984

Crown Pools is a swimming venue in Ipswich that opened in 1984.

== Design and building ==
Crown Pools has a collection of three pools: a 8-lane 25x18m pool (0.9-1.8m deep), a pleasure pool (0-1.75m deep) with a wave machine and a teaching pool (0.75m deep). It is the biggest leisure facility in Ipswich also offering a range of indoor facilities including gym and sauna. When it opened in 1984, there were queues of children waiting to gain entrance and in the summer of 2019 saw more than 1,000 children swimmers each day.

The land was originally home of the Art Deco designed Egertons Ipswich Ltd (garage and showroom). It was demolished in the early 1960s and was temporarily used as a market before Crown Pools building began.

In 2023, the requirement to have the bulk supply of sodium hypochlorite to the facility by an external contractor was changed to an Electro Chlorination System, which generates its own sodium hypochlorite on site. This reduces the Ipswich Borough Council's carbon footprint and make a cost saving.

== Notable visitors ==
Lady Diana visited Crown Pools and spoke to swimmers in 1990.

== Refurbishment and current use ==
In 2010, new changing area and reception and improved air conditioning were installed as part of a £3.5million revamp.

in 2011, the leisure and teaching pool were emptied in phase II of the refurbishment. The work involves tiling, roofing, lighting, general redecoration and replacing heating equipment underneath the pools. The pools re-opened in 2012.

In 2012, the competition pool was refurbished and re-opened later that year.

== Future ==
Crown pool will likely be closed when the new "low carbon aquatics centre" opens next to Ipswich Town Football Club in 2027. The aquatics centre will include an Olympic sized pool, water flumes, a bigger gym, better facilities for fitness classes, soft play and a cafe.

The Crown Pool site will likely be redeveloped for housing or commercial use.
