= Ipswich =

Town in Suffolk, England

Ipswich Borough of Ipswich
- Town and borough
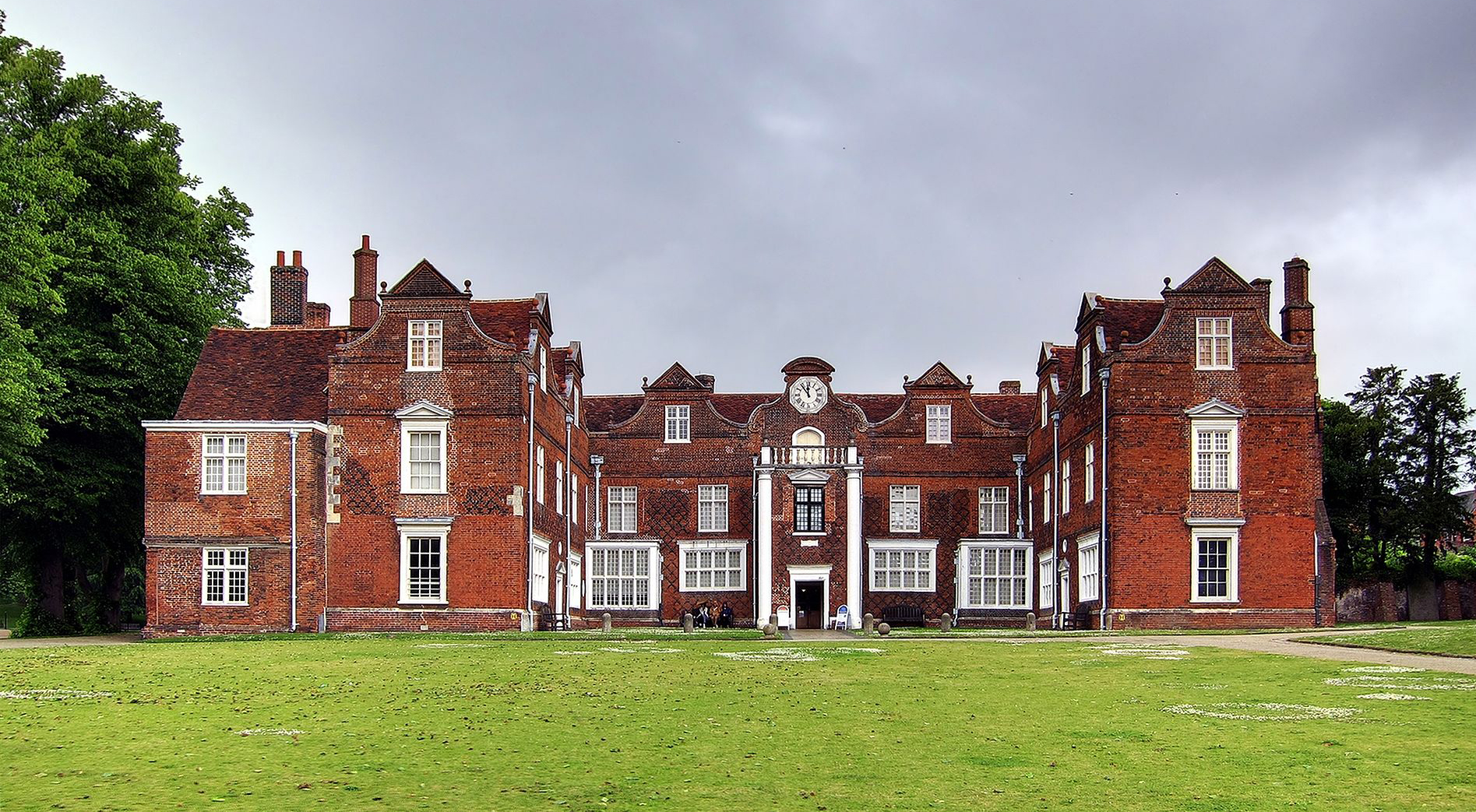
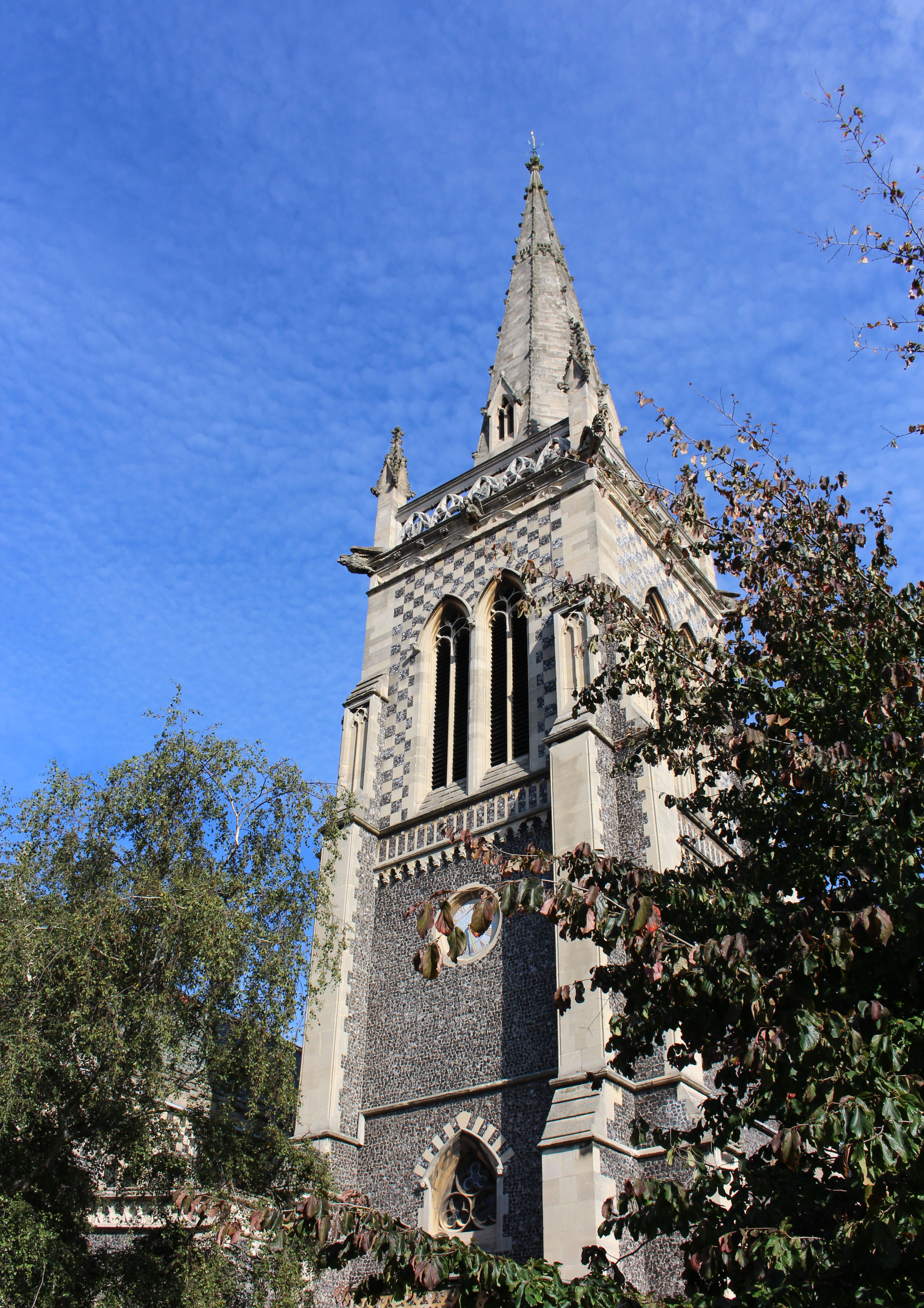
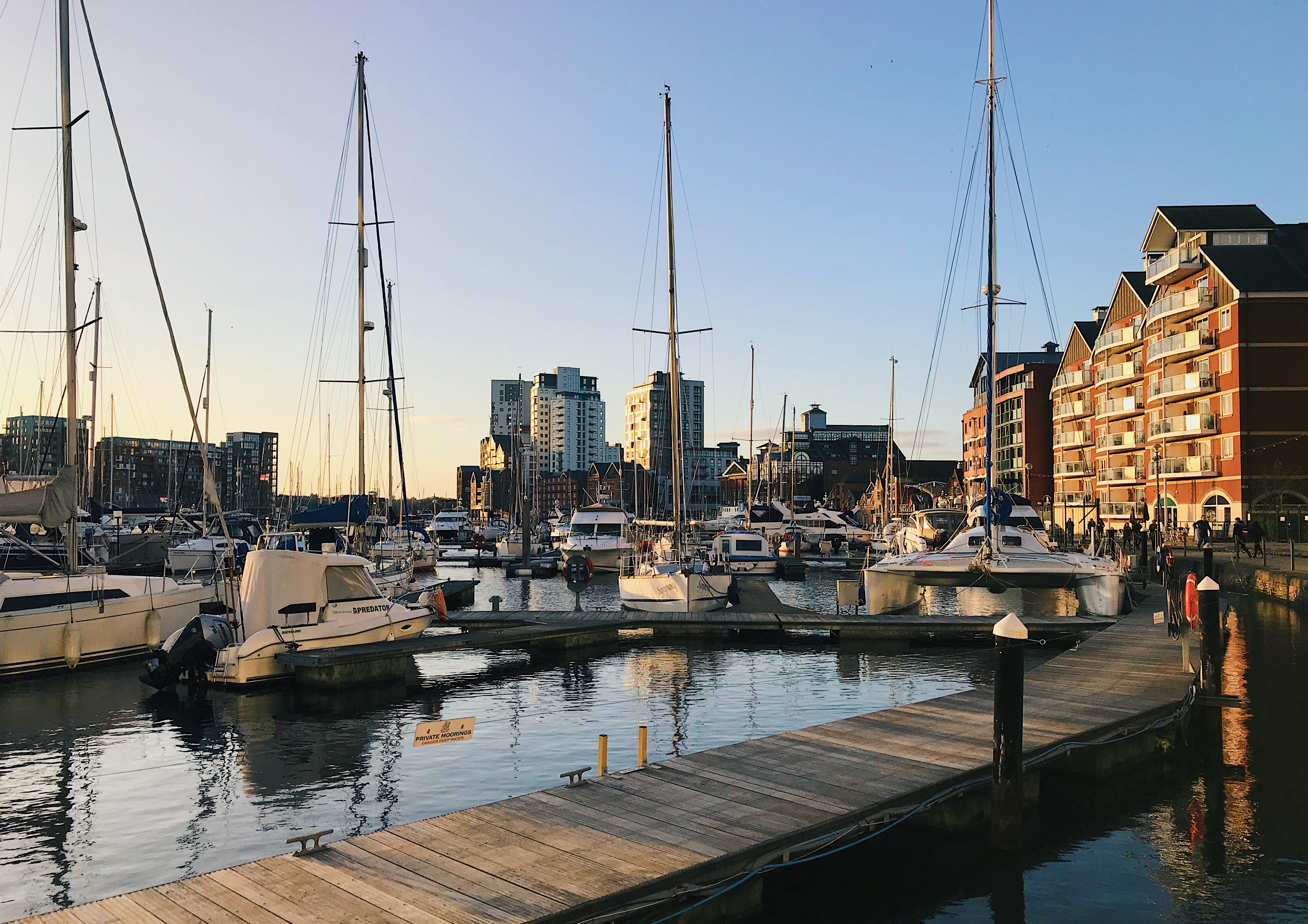
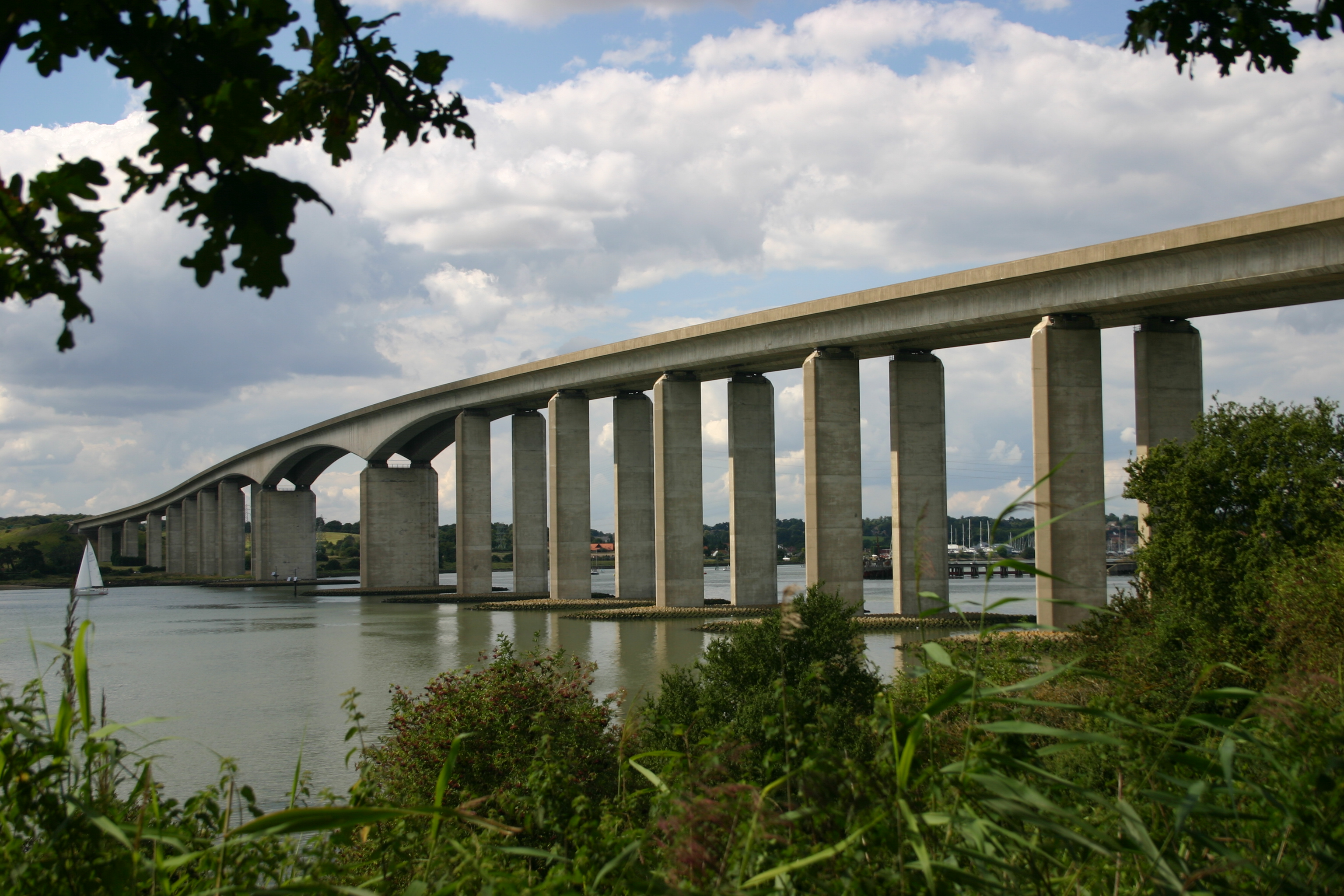
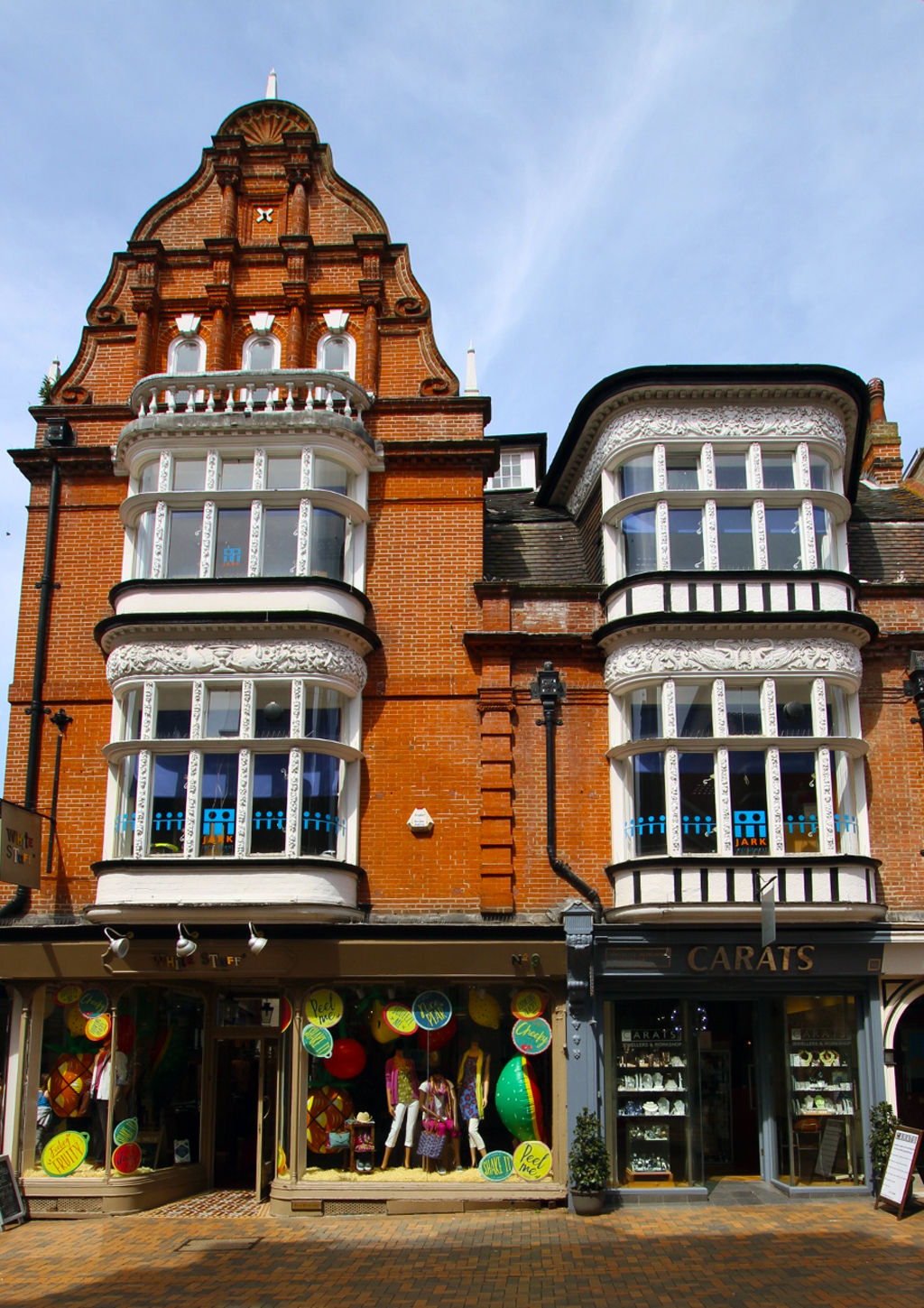
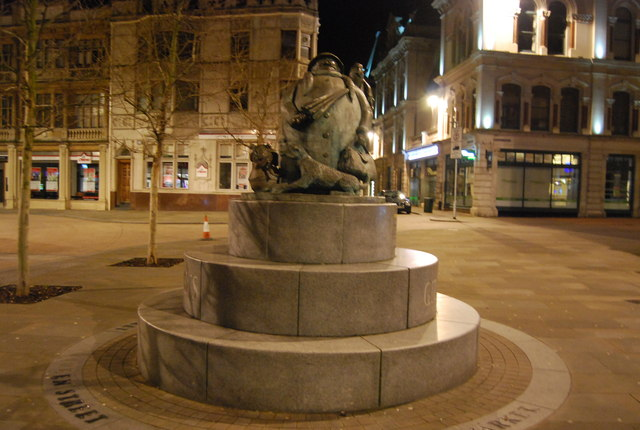
- Christchurch Mansion Ipswich Minster Ipswich Waterfront Orwell Bridge Ipswich Town Centre Giles Circus

- Coat of arms
- Motto(s): Munia civitatis decus civium (The functions of citizenship are the glory of the citizens)
- Location within Suffolk

- Location within England Location within the United Kingdom
- Coordinates: 52°3′34″N 1°9′20″E
- Sovereign state: United Kingdom
- Country: England
- Region: East of England
- County: Suffolk
- District: Ipswich
- Areas of the town: List: California; Castle Hill; Chantry; Gainsborough; Greenwich; Ipswich Village; Ipswich Waterfront; Kesgrave (Part); Maidenhall Estate; Pinewood (Part); Purdis Farm (Part); Ravenswood; Rushmere; Stoke; Stoke Park; Westbourne; Whitehouse; Whitton

Government
  - Type: Leader and Cabinet
  - Body: Ipswich Borough Council
  - MPs: Jack Abbott (L); Patrick Spencer (C)

Area – District ranked 262nd
  - Total: 15.22 sq mi (39.42 km^{2})

Population (2025)
  - Total: 139,457
  - Rank: 173rd
  - Density: 9,100/sq mi (3,530/km^{2})

Ethnicity (2021)
  - Ethnic groups: List: 84.3% White; 5.5% Asian; 4.6% Mixed; 3.5% Black; 2.1% other

Religion (2021)
  - Religion: List: 45.3% no religion; 42.2% Christianity; 8.6% other; 3.9% Islam
- Postcode: IP
- Area code: 01473
- Vehicle registration area code: AV, AW, AX, AY
- ONS code: 42UD
- Website: ipswich.gov.uk

Ipswich (/ˈɪpswɪtʃ/) is a port town and borough in Suffolk, England, located on the River Orwell. It is the county town, and largest in Suffolk, followed by Lowestoft and Bury St Edmunds, and the third-largest population centre in East Anglia, after Peterborough and Norwich. It is 65 miles (105 km) northeast of London. In 2025, Ipswich had a population of 139,457, making it the fourth-largest in the East of England and the 42nd-largest in England and Wales. It is surrounded by the towns and villages of Kesgrave, Woodbridge, Bramford and Martlesham Heath.

Ipswich was first recorded during the medieval period as Gippeswic; the town has also been recorded as Gyppewicus and Yppswyche. It has been continuously inhabited since the Saxon period, and is believed to be one of the oldest towns in the United Kingdom. The settlement was of great economic importance to the Kingdom of England throughout its history, particularly in trade, with the town's historical dock, Ipswich Waterfront, known as the largest and most important dock in the Kingdom.

Ipswich is divided into various quarters, with the town centre and the waterfront drawing the most footfall. The town centre features the retail shopping district and the historic town square, known as the Cornhill. The waterfront, south of the town centre on a meander of the River Orwell, offers a picturesque setting with a marina, luxury yachts, high-rise apartment buildings, and a variety of restaurants and cafes. The waterfront is also home to the University of Suffolk campus.

Ipswich is adjacent to the Suffolk & Essex Coast & Heaths National Landscape AONB and is close to Dedham Vale AONB. The town has a tourist sector, with 3.5 million people reported to have visited the town in 2016. In 2020, Ipswich was ranked as an emerging global tourist destination by TripAdvisor.

== History ==
Ipswich is one of England's oldest towns, and is claimed to be the oldest still continuing town to have been established and developed by the English, with continuous settlement since early Anglo-Saxon times.

=== Roman settlement ===
A large Roman fort, part of the coastal defences of Britain, stood at Walton near Felixstowe (13 miles (21 km), and the largest Roman villa in Suffolk (possibly an administrative complex) stood at Castle Hill (north-west Ipswich).

=== Middle Ages ===
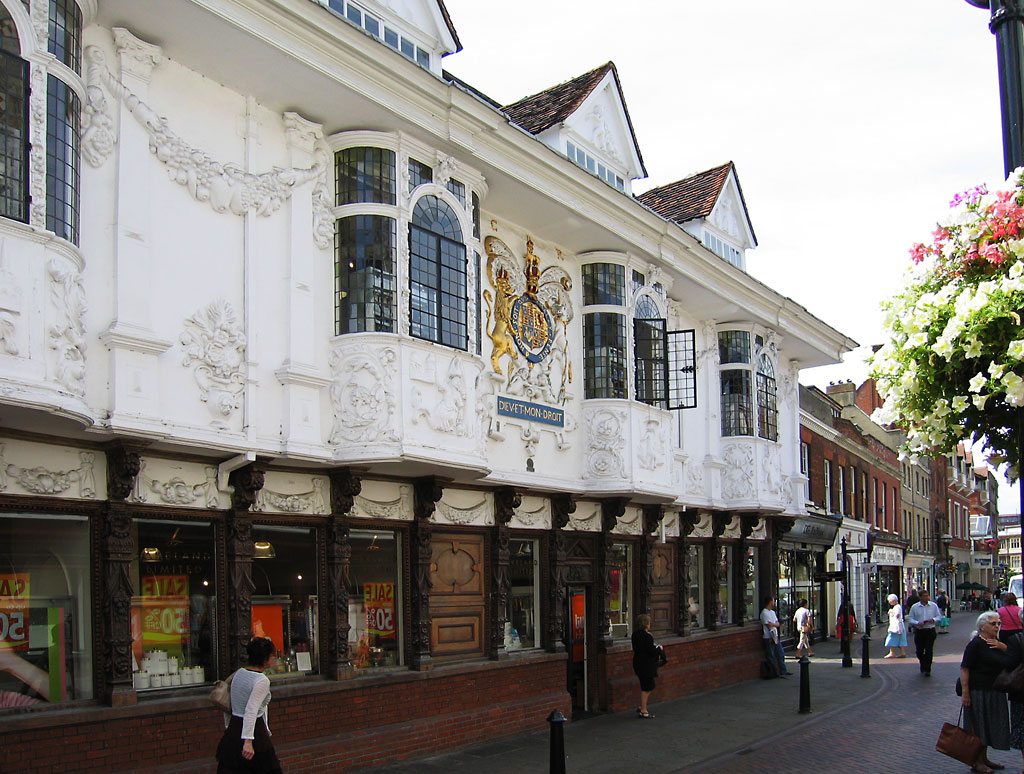
Ancient House, Ipswich is decorated with a particularly fine example of pargeting.

The modern town took shape in Anglo-Saxon times (7th–8th centuries) around the Port of Ipswich. As the coastal states of north-western Europe emerged from the collapse of the Roman Empire, essential North Sea trade and communication between eastern Britain and the continent (especially to Scandinavia, and through the Rhine) passed through the former Roman ports of London (serving the kingdoms of Mercia, the East Saxons, Kent) and York (Eoforwic) (serving the Kingdom of Northumbria).

Gipeswic (also in other spellings such as Gippeswich) arose as the equivalent to these, serving the Kingdom of East Anglia, its early imported wares dating to the time of King Rædwald, ruler of the East Angles (616–624). The famous ship-burial and treasure at Sutton Hoo nearby (9 miles; 14 km) is probably his grave. The Ipswich Museum houses replicas of the Roman Mildenhall and Sutton Hoo treasures. A gallery devoted to the town's origins includes Anglo-Saxon weapons, jewellery and other artefacts.

The seventh-century town was centred near the quay. Around 700 AD, Frisian potters from the Netherlands area settled in Ipswich and set up the first large-scale potteries in England since Roman times. Their wares were traded far across England, and the industry was unique to Ipswich for 200 years. With growing prosperity, in about 720 AD a large new part of the town was laid out in the Buttermarket area. Ipswich was becoming a place of national and international importance. Parts of the ancient road plan still survive in its modern streets.

After the invasion of 869, Ipswich fell under Viking rule. The earth ramparts circling the town centre were probably raised by Vikings in Ipswich around 900 to prevent its recapture by the English. They were unsuccessful. The town operated a mint under royal licence from King Edgar in the 970s, which continued through the Norman Conquest until the time of King John, in about 1215. The abbreviation Gipes appears on the coins.

King John granted the town its first charter in 1200, laying the medieval foundations of its modern civil government. Thenceforth Ipswich strongly maintained its jurisdiction over the Liberty of Ipswich, an administrative area extending over about 35 square kilometres centred on the town.

In the next four centuries it made the most of its wealth. Five large religious houses, including two Augustinian Priories (St Peter and St Paul, and Holy Trinity, both mid-12th century), and those of the Ipswich Greyfriars (Franciscans, before 1298), Ipswich Whitefriars (Carmelites founded 1278–79) and Ipswich Blackfriars (Dominicans, before 1263), stood in medieval Ipswich. The last Carmelite Prior of Ipswich was the celebrated John Bale, author of the oldest English historical verse-drama (Kynge Johan, c. 1538). There were also several hospitals, including the leper hospital of St Mary Magdalene, founded before 1199.

During the Middle Ages the Marian Shrine of Our Lady of Grace was a famous pilgrimage destination, and attracted many pilgrims including Henry VIII and Katherine of Aragon. At the Reformation the statue was taken away to London to be burned, though some claim that it survived and is preserved at Nettuno, Italy.

Around 1380, Geoffrey Chaucer satirised the merchants of Ipswich in The Canterbury Tales. Thomas Wolsey, the future cardinal, was born in Ipswich in 1473 as the son of a wealthy landowner. One of Henry VIII's closest political allies, he founded a college in the town in 1528, which was for its brief duration one of the homes of the Ipswich School. He remains one of the town's most famed figures.

=== Early-modern era ===
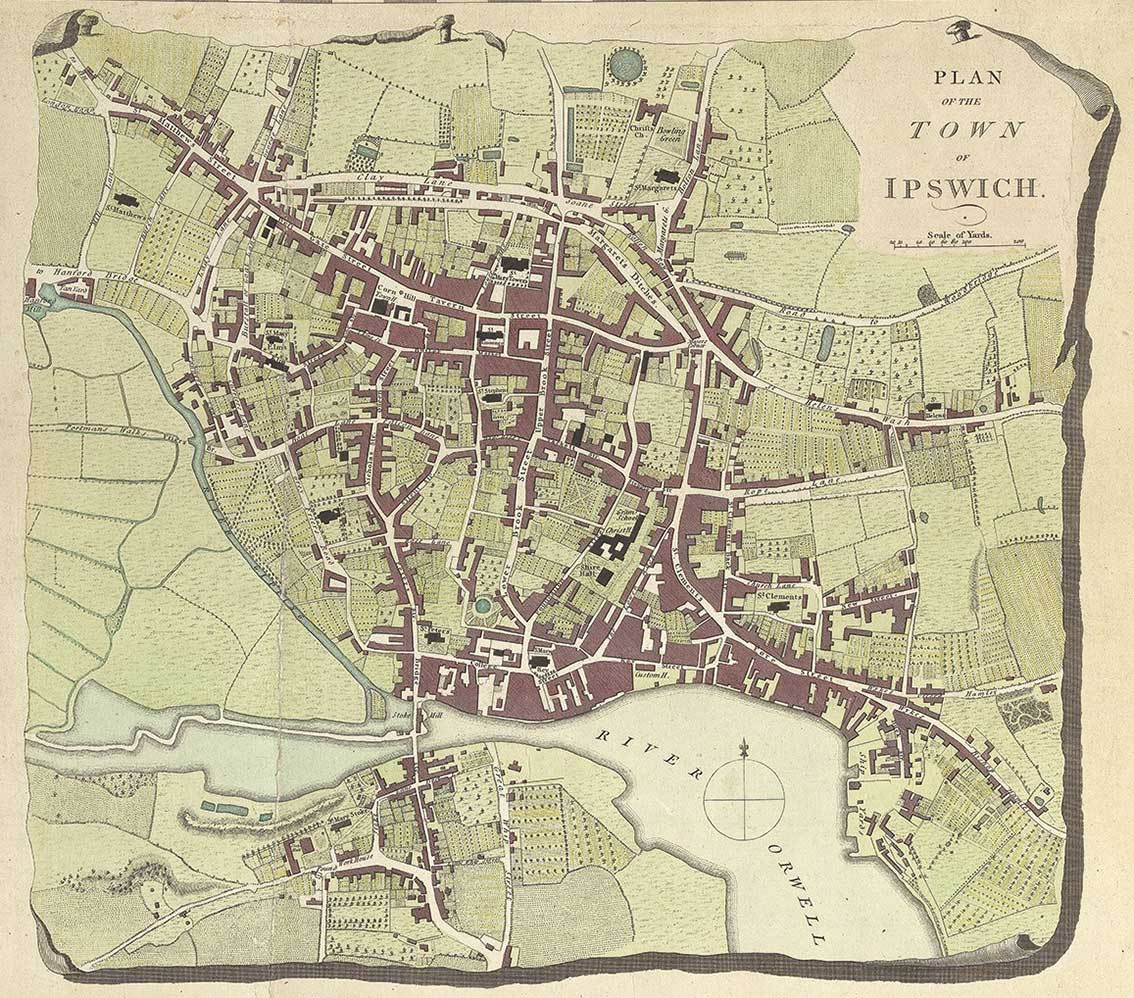
Early map of Ipswich from Hodskinson's 1783 Map of Suffolk

During the 14th to 17th centuries Ipswich was a kontor for the Hanseatic League, the port being used for imports and exports to the Baltic.

In the time of Queen Mary the Ipswich Martyrs were burnt at the stake on the Cornhill for their Protestant beliefs. A monument commemorating this event now stands in Christchurch Park. Ipswich was a printing, bookseller centre, and an entrepôt for continental books in the 16th century. From 1611 to 1634 Ipswich was a major centre for emigration to New England. This was encouraged by the Town Lecturer, Samuel Ward. His brother Nathaniel Ward was first minister of Ipswich, Massachusetts, where a promontory was named 'Castle Hill' after the place of that name in north-west Ipswich, UK. Ipswich was also one of the main ports of embarkation for puritans leaving other East Anglian towns and villages for the Massachusetts Bay Colony during the 1630s and what has become known as the Great Migration.

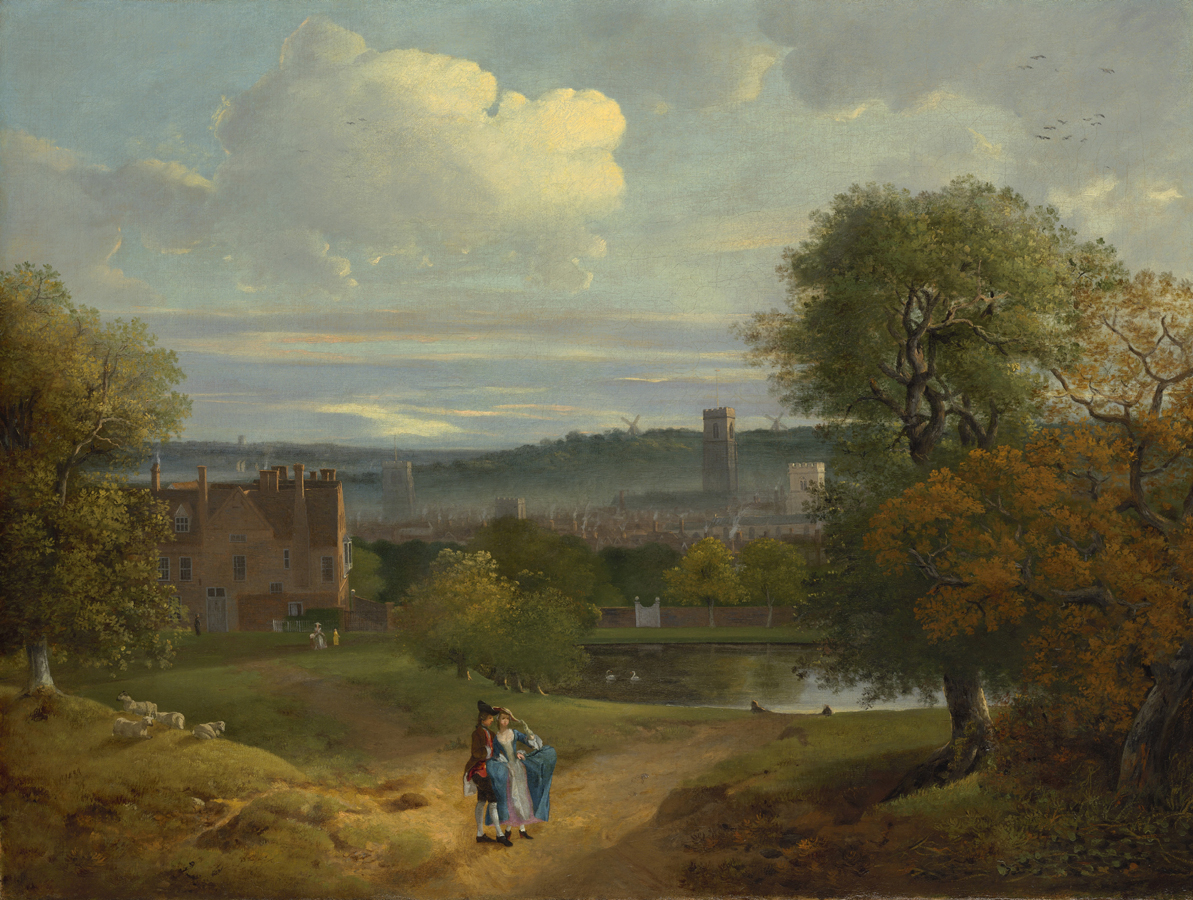
View of Ipswich from Christchurch Park by Thomas Gainsborough c. 1746-49

The painter Thomas Gainsborough lived and worked in Ipswich. In 1835, Charles Dickens stayed in Ipswich and used it as a setting for scenes in his novel The Pickwick Papers. The hotel where he resided first opened in 1518; it was then known as The Tavern and later became known as the Great White Horse Hotel. Dickens made the hotel famous in chapter XXII of The Pickwick Papers, vividly describing the hotel's meandering corridors and stairs.

=== 19th and 20th centuries ===
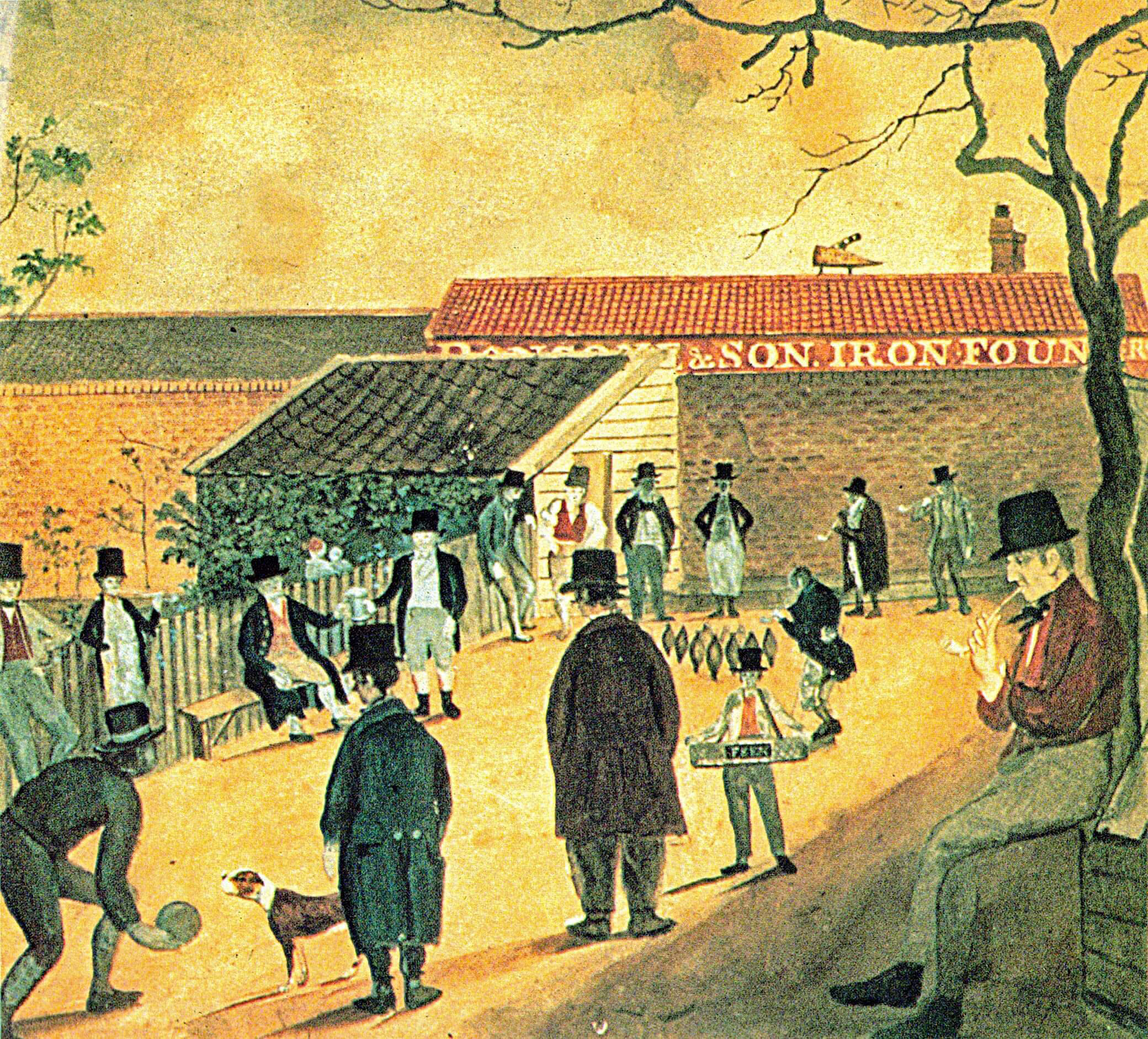
A circa 1810 painting of outdoor bowling near Ransome & Son Foundry, an early embodiment of Ipswich's longtime agricultural equipment maker Ransomes, Sims & Jefferies

In 1824 Dr George Birkbeck, with support from several local businessmen, founded one of the first Mechanics' Institutes, which survives to this day as the independent Ipswich Institute reading room and library. The building is located at 15 Tavern Street.

In the mid-19th century coprolite (fossilised animal dung) was discovered; the material was mined and then dissolved in acid, the resulting mixture forming the basis of Fisons fertiliser business.

The Tolly Cobbold brewery, built in the 18th century and rebuilt in 1894–96, is one of the finest Victorian breweries in the UK. There was a Cobbold brewery in the town from 1746 until 2002 when Ridley's Breweries took Tolly Cobbold over. Felix Thornley Cobbold presented Christchurch Mansion to the town in 1896. Smaller breweries include St Jude's Brewery, situated in an 18th-century coach-house near the town centre.

Ipswich was subject to bombing by German Zeppelins during World War I but the greatest damage by far occurred during the German bombing raids of World War II. The area in and around the docks was especially devastated. Eighty civilians died by enemy action in the Ipswich county borough area during the latter war. The last bombs to fall on Ipswich landed on Seymour Road at 2 a.m. on 2 March 1945, killing nine people and destroying six houses.

The Willis Building is a glass-clad building owned by Willis. Designed by Norman Foster, the building dates from 1974, when it was known as the Willis Faber & Dumas building. It became the youngest grade I listed building in Britain in 1991, being at the time one of only two listed buildings to be less than thirty years old.

In September 1993, Ipswich and Arras, Nord Pas-de-Calais, France, became twin towns, and a square in the new Buttermarket development was named Arras Square to mark the relationship.

Ipswich formerly had a municipal airport to the south-east of the town, which was opened in 1929 by the Ipswich Corporation. The airport was controversially closed in 1996. The site was redeveloped for housing as the Ravenswood estate.

=== 21st century ===
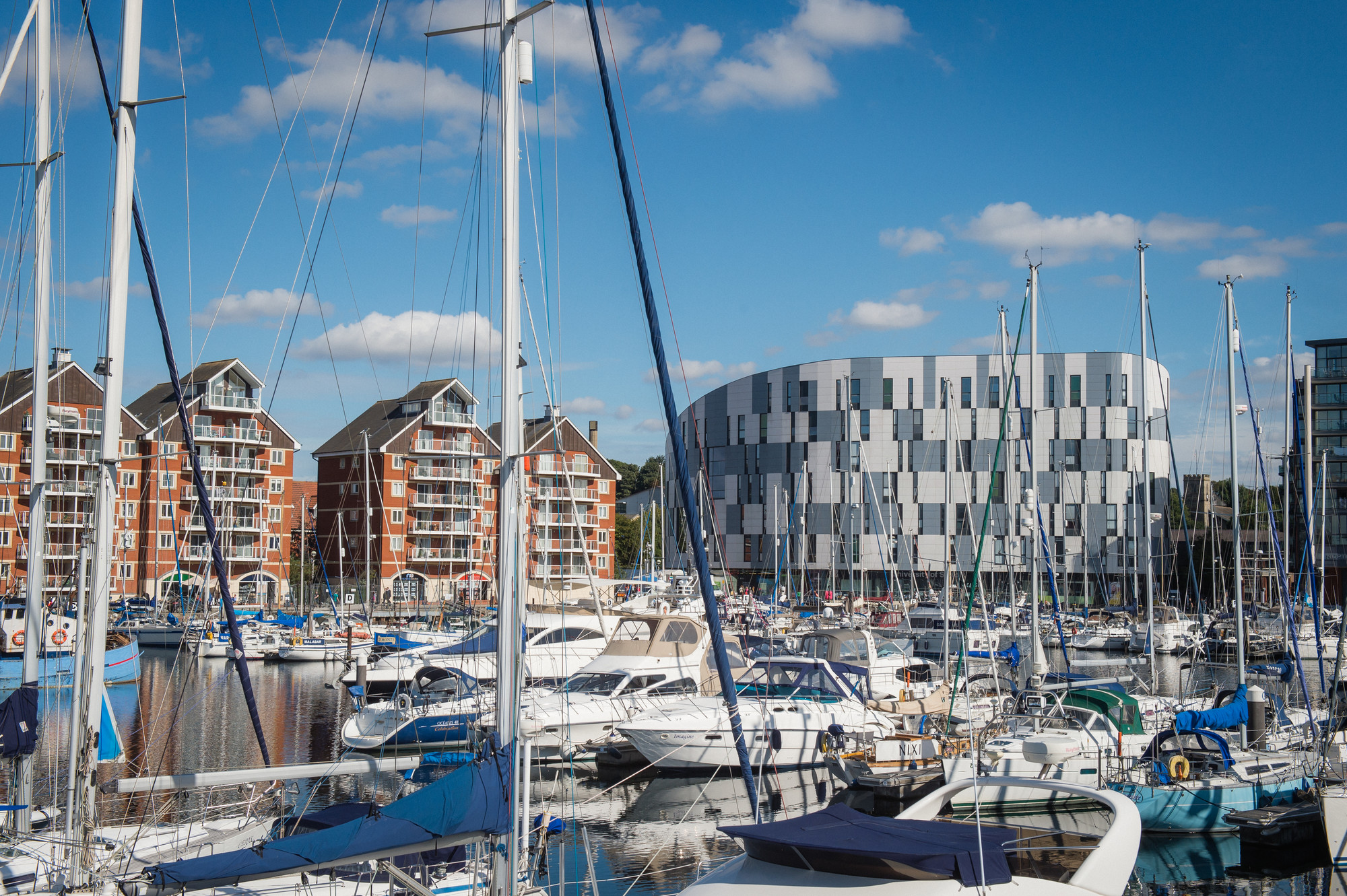
The Ipswich Waterfront

Ipswich has experienced a building boom in the early part of the 21st century. Construction has mainly concentrated around the former industrial dock which is now known as the Ipswich Waterfront. Regeneration to the area has made it a hub of culture in Ipswich, the area boasts fine dining restaurants, a boutique hotel, and the new regional university, the University of Suffolk. The new high rise buildings of the Regatta Quay development has topped the list of the tallest buildings in Ipswich. The mixed-use high rise building, The Mill, is currently the tallest building in Suffolk.

Ipswich has made several unsuccessful bids for city status. The town does not have a cathedral, so the Bishop of St Edmundsbury and Ipswich is based at Bury St Edmunds, the former county town of West Suffolk.

Ipswich is the largest town in Suffolk, followed by Lowestoft and Bury St Edmunds, and the third-largest population centre in East Anglia, after Peterborough and Norwich. It is 65 miles (105 km) northeast of London and in 2011 had a population of 144,957. The Ipswich built-up area is the fourth-largest in the East of England and the 42nd-largest in England and Wales. It includes the towns and villages of Kesgrave, Woodbridge, Bramford and Martlesham Heath.

Under upcoming local government reform plans Ipswich will form the core of a new Ipswich and South Suffolk unitary authority from 2028.

== Localities ==
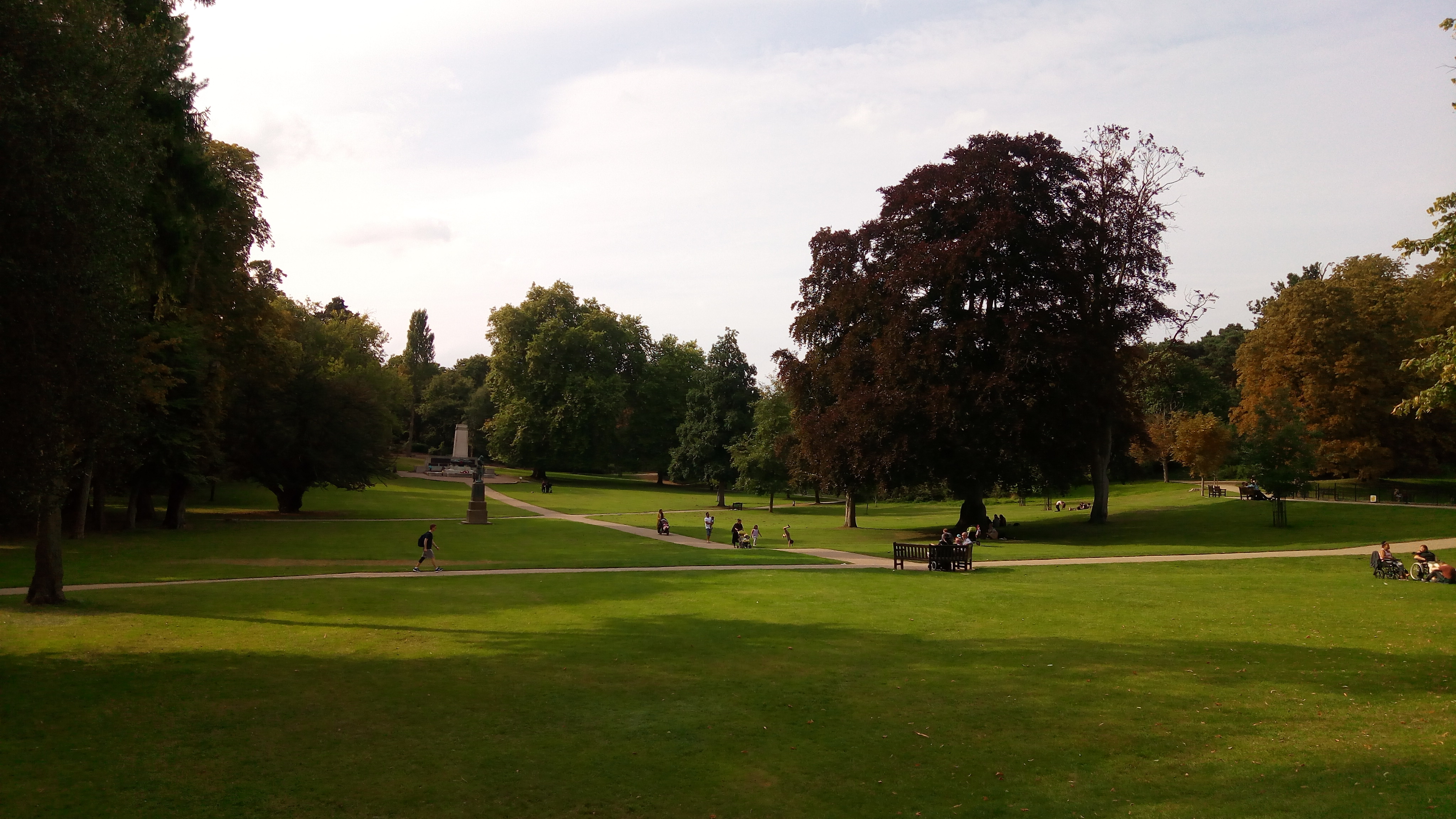
Christchurch Park is a large 82-acre park in the centre of the town.

The waterfront is now devoted primarily to leisure use and includes extensive recent development of residential apartment blocks and a university campus. Businesses operated from the dock include luxury boats and a timber merchant. Other industries have been established to the south of the wet dock. The area was flooded in 2013 during a tidal surge. In February 2019 a flood gate, which protects the "New Cut", was unveiled. The flood barrier, similar in design to the Thames Barrier, cost £67m. The Ipswich Village Development, begun in 2002 around Russell Road, is home to Suffolk County Council and Ipswich Borough Council.

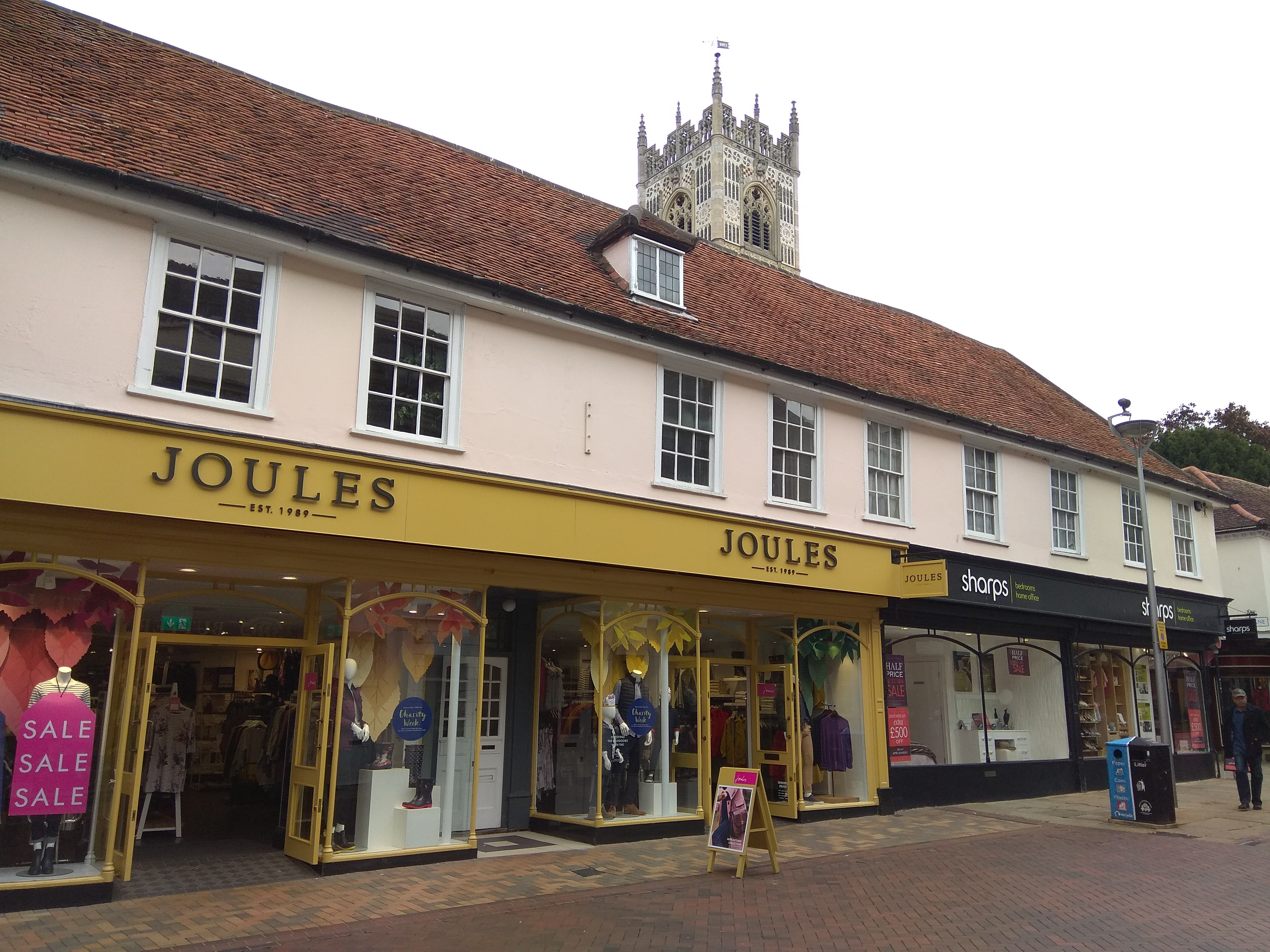
Shops along the Ipswich high street

Holywells Ward, Ipswich is the area around Holywells Park, a 67-acre (27-hectare) public park situated near the docks, and the subject of a painting by Thomas Gainsborough. Alexandra Park is the nearest park to the waterfront's northern quay, and situated on Back Hamlet, adjacent to University of Suffolk.

Localities outside the town centre include Bixley Farm, Broke Hall, California, Castle Hill, Chantry, The Dales, Gainsborough, Greenwich, Maidenhall, Pinewood, Priory Heath, Racecourse, Ravenswood (built on a former airfield), Rose Hill, Rushmere, Springvale, St Margarets, Stoke, Warren Heath, Westbourne, Whitehouse and Whitton.

To the east of the town is Trinity Park near Bucklesham the home of the annual Suffolk Show, a typical county show. The 'Trinity' is the name given to the three animals native to the county of Suffolk, namely Red Poll cattle, the powerful Suffolk Punch horse and the black-faced Suffolk sheep.

== Culture ==
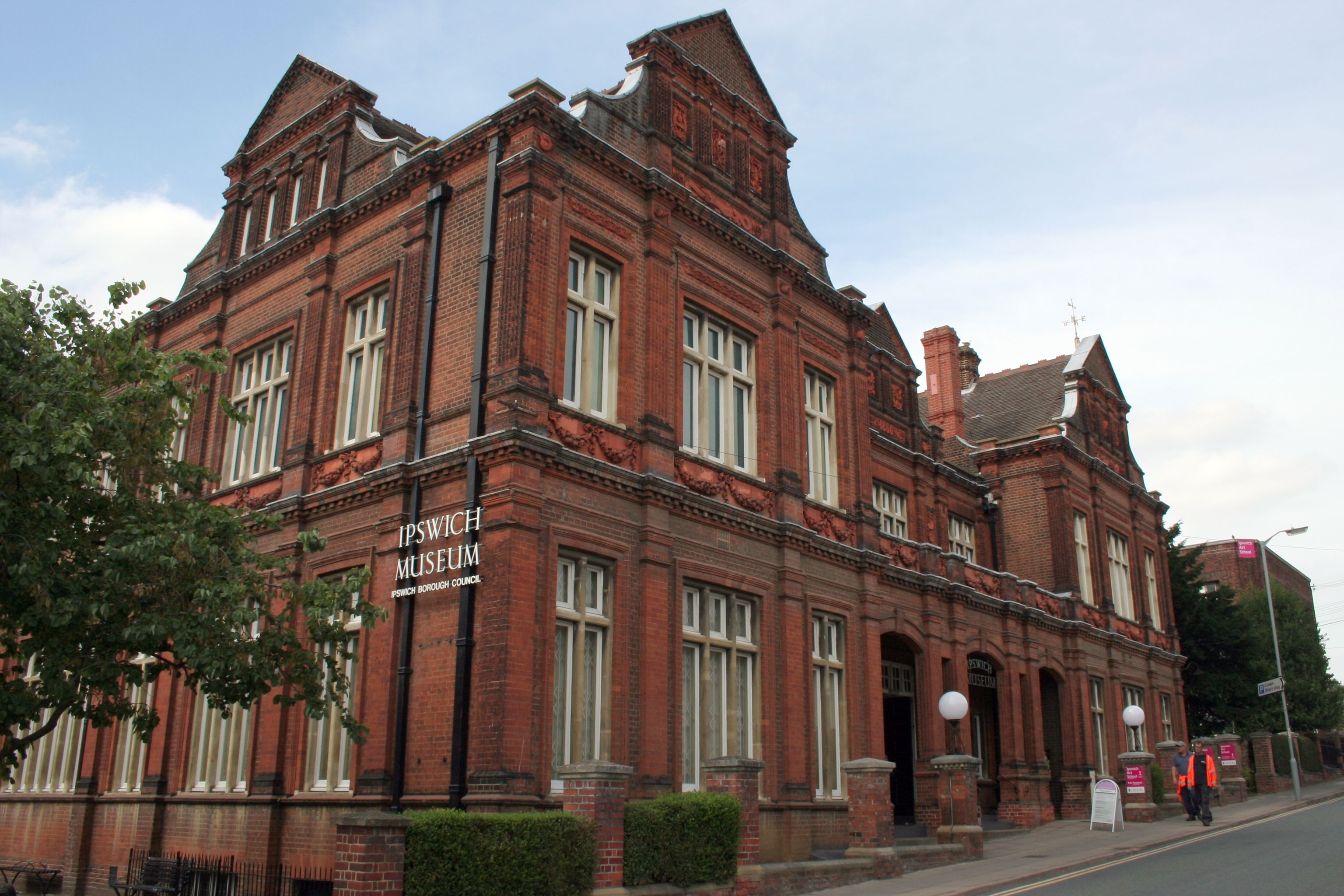
The Ipswich Museum

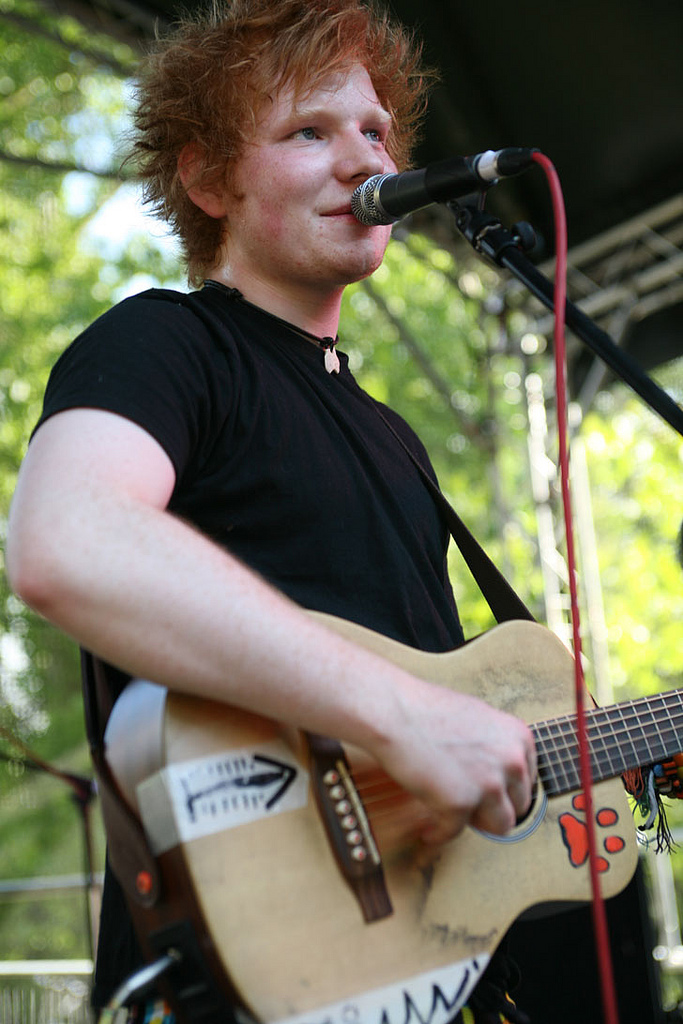
Ed Sheeran playing at Ipswich Arts Festival 2010

For a town of its size, Ipswich is noted for its cultural institutions and artistic community. Ipswich is home to a number of art galleries, the most prominent of which are located at Christchurch Mansion, the Town Hall, Ancient House, and the Ipswich Art Gallery. The visual arts are further represented by many sculptures at easily accessible sites in public spaces. The Borough Council promotes the creation of new public works of art and has been known to make this a condition of planning permission. The town is also home to the Ipswich Museum and the Ipswich Transport Museum.

Ipswich is also home to a number of performing arts venues, music festivals, and cultural organisations. With a capacity of 1551, Regent Theatre, built in 1929 and located on St. Helen's St. in Ipswich, is the largest theatre in East Anglia. The Beatles played a concert there in 1963. The New Wolsey Theatre is a 400-seat theatre situated on Civic Drive. Although the Wolsey Theatre was built in 1979, The New Wolsey Company took on the management and running of the Wolsey Theatre in 2000, opening its first production in February 2001. It has also been known as the Gaumont Theatre. It was designated as a Grade II listed building in 2000. 2001 also saw the founding of the Gecko theatre company, an award-winning and internationally acclaimed physical theatre company, led by Artistic Director Amit Lahav. The dance company DanceEast, established in 1983 as Suffolk Dance, is also based in Ipwich. Brighten The Corners, a cultural nonprofit set up by Out Loud Music CIC, operates three full-time venues in Ipswich, promotes independent and emerging artists/musicians, and organised the annual town center arts festival. Launched in Ipswich in 2007, Spill Festival of Performance organizes events in Ipswich, East Anglia, and elsewhere, supporting local artists and attracting internationally significant and ground-breaking artists’ work to Ipswich and the UK. They also run year-round events and activities in the SPILL Think Tank venue, next door to Ipswich Museum. The Eastern Angles Theatre Company, founded in 1982, is based at its community hub the Eastern Angles Centre in Ipswich, engaging in rural tours and seasonal performances. Red Rose Chain a not for profit theatre company based at The Avenue Theatre, delivering a vibrant professional and community programme.

== Media ==
=== Television ===
Ipswich is covered by BBC Look East and ITV News Anglia, both broadcast from Norwich.

=== Radio ===
The town has five local radio stations, BBC Radio Suffolk which broadcast from its studios on St Matthews Street in the town, the commercial station Heart East which was founded in 1975 as Radio Orwell covering the A14 corridor in Suffolk, and Ipswich 102 who took over the FM frequency in 2018, until 2020 when it rebranded as Greatest Hits Radio Ipswich & Suffolk. Then in September 2022, the station was rebranded again as Nation Radio Suffolk where it has one local show on weekday afternoons 1pm-4pm, hosted by Rob Chandler (who hosted the local afternoon show prior to the rebrand). The younger audience was catered for with Suffolk-based Kiss 105-108, until September 2023 when its 106.4 frequency flipped over to carrying Greatest Hits Radio Ipswich & Suffolk. Ipswich Community Radio was launched in 2007.

=== Newspapers ===
The town's daily newspaper is the Ipswich Star, a sister title to the county's daily newspaper the East Anglian Daily Times.

== Buildings ==
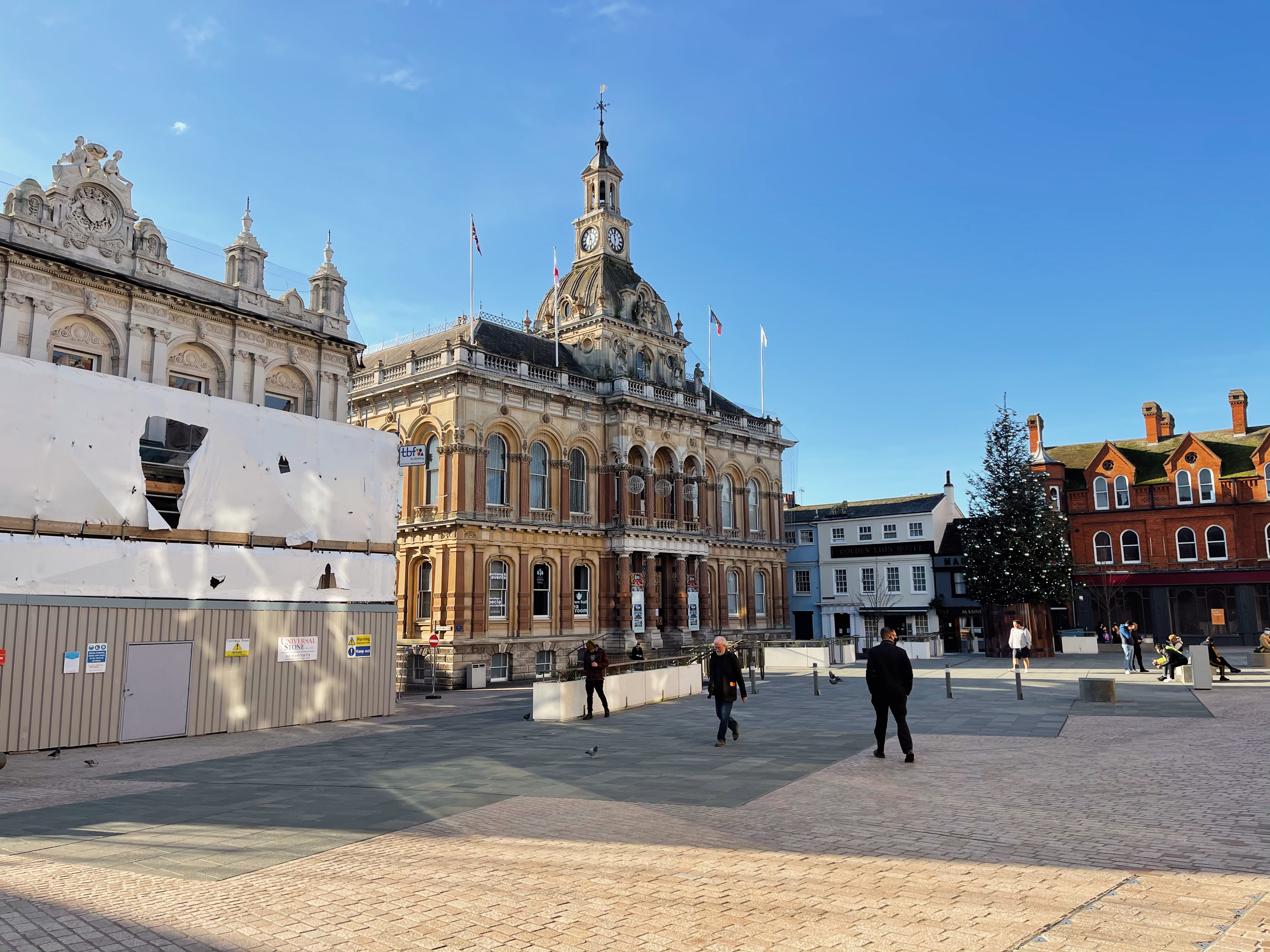
Ipswich Town Hall on The Cornhill town square

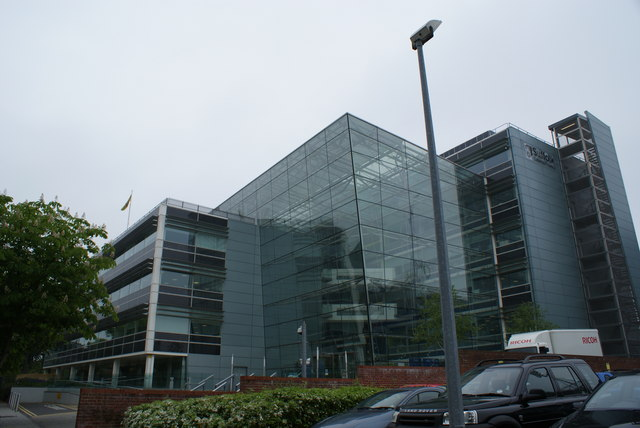
Endeavour House, home of Suffolk County Council

In addition to the Christchurch Mansion and Ancient House, Ipswich in the 21st century has some important cultural buildings including the New Wolsey Theatre and the Regent Theatre—the largest theatre venue in East Anglia where, in 1964, the Beatles performed when it was still known as the Gaumont. There is also the Corn Exchange in King Street which was completed in 1882.

There are several medieval Ipswich churches but the grandest is Ipswich Minster (previously known as St. Mary-le-Tower), rebuilt by the Victorians. Holy Trinity Church by the waterfront is one of the few churches in the country which was built during the reign of William IV and whilst the outside looks plain, the interior is quite spectacular. The world's oldest circle of church bells is housed in St Lawrence Church, which is maintained by the Ipswich Historic Churches Trust.

The Ancient House in the Buttermarket is an example of a merchant house which features Tudor pargeting and the Ipswich window.

Another notable example of Tudor architecture in Ipswich is Wolsey's Gate, the sole remnant of a college founded in the town by Cardinal Wolsey.

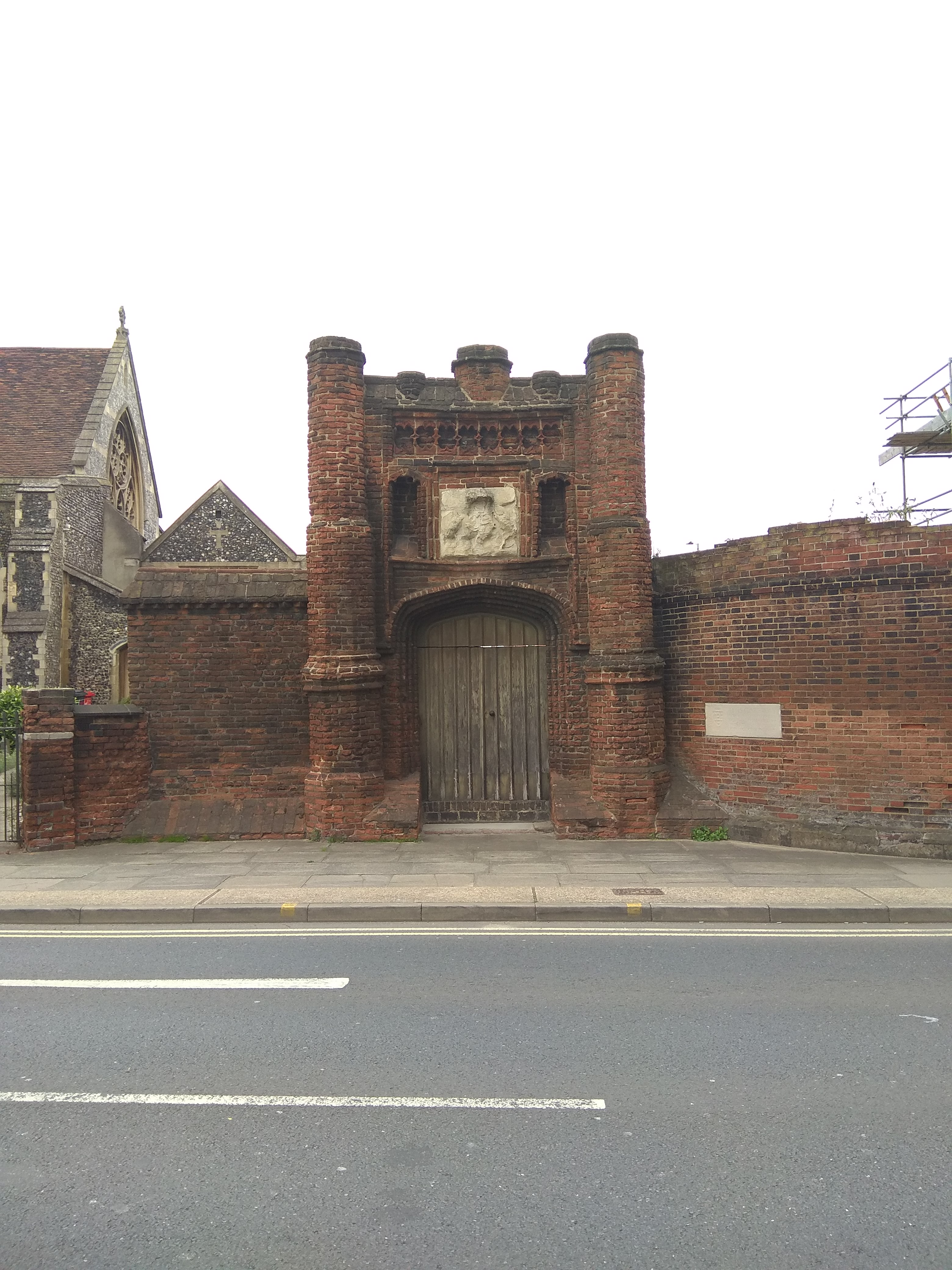
Wolsey's Gate, the sole remnant of a grand college in Ipswich

The former East Suffolk County Hall is just east of the centre of Ipswich. It is listed as a building at risk by the Victorian Society. The Town Hall remains in use as an arts centre and events venue; it dates from 1866 (architects: Bellamy & Hardy of Lincoln). The 18th Century Grade II listed Old Post Office, which was built in 1881, has been renovated and is now home to the Botanist bar.

Initially opening on museum street in 1847 it remained the site of the museum until 1881. In 1881 the Ipswich museum first opened its doors in its new, purpose built, location showcasing a primary focus on natural history but later expanded including sections on anthropology.

Modern buildings include Endeavour House (headquarters of Suffolk County Council and formerly home of the TXU Corporation), Grafton House (home of Ipswich Borough Council) and Ipswich Crown Court, all located on Russell Road in the area known as the Ipswich Village Development, which includes Portman Road stadium. The stadium has hosted England under-21, under-23, and international soccer matches, as well as rugby union and hockey matches.

In the waterfront area The Mill is the tallest building in Suffolk, reaching 23 storeys.

On the north-west side of Ipswich lies Broomhill Pool, a Grade II listed Olympic-sized lido which opened in 1938 and closed in 2002, since which time a campaign to see it restored and re-opened has been run by the Broomhill Pool Trust. On the southern side of Ipswich is historic Belstead Lodge, now the Belstead Brook Hotel.

== Governance ==
The Municipal Borough of Ipswich was created in 1836 by the Municipal Corporations Act 1835. It was the form of local government for the ancient borough of Ipswich until the Local Government Act 1888 replaced it with the County Borough of Ipswich in 1889. The rest of the county of Suffolk outside of Ipswich was split into East Suffolk and West Suffolk for administrative purposes and the term administrative county was introduced. There was a level of continuity as Ipswich was still run by the Ipswich Corporation, independently from East Suffolk (which surrounded it), although the county council was based in Ipswich at East Suffolk County Hall. Both originated from the ancient borough of Ipswich. The local authority was Ipswich Corporation. Following the passage of the Reform Act 1832, the government set up a Royal Commission in July 1833 to investigate how local councils worked. On 25 March 1903 all the parishes in the district were merged into a single parish. On 1 April 1934 the district look in part of the parish of Bramford from Bosmere and Claydon Rural District, parts of the parishes of Belstead and Sproughton from Samford Rural District and parts of the parishes of Alnesbourn Priory, Purdis Farm and Rushmere St Andrew from Woodbridge Rural District. On 1 April 1952 the district look in parts of the parishes of Akenham, Bramford and Whitton from Gipping Rural District, part of Sproughton from Samford Rural District and parts of Nacton, Purdis Farm, Rushmere St Andrew, Tuddenham St Martin and Westerfield from Deben Rural District, 1 acre was also moved to Deben Rural District from Ipswich. On 1 April 1974 following the Local Government Act 1972 Ipswich became a non-metropolitan district with borough status in the administrative county of Suffolk with the same boundaries as the abolished county borough. Ipswich Borough Council became the local authority, with county council duties fulfilled by Suffolk County Council. No successor parish was formed so it became unparished. On 1 April 1986 land was transferred from the Ipswich district to Westerfield.

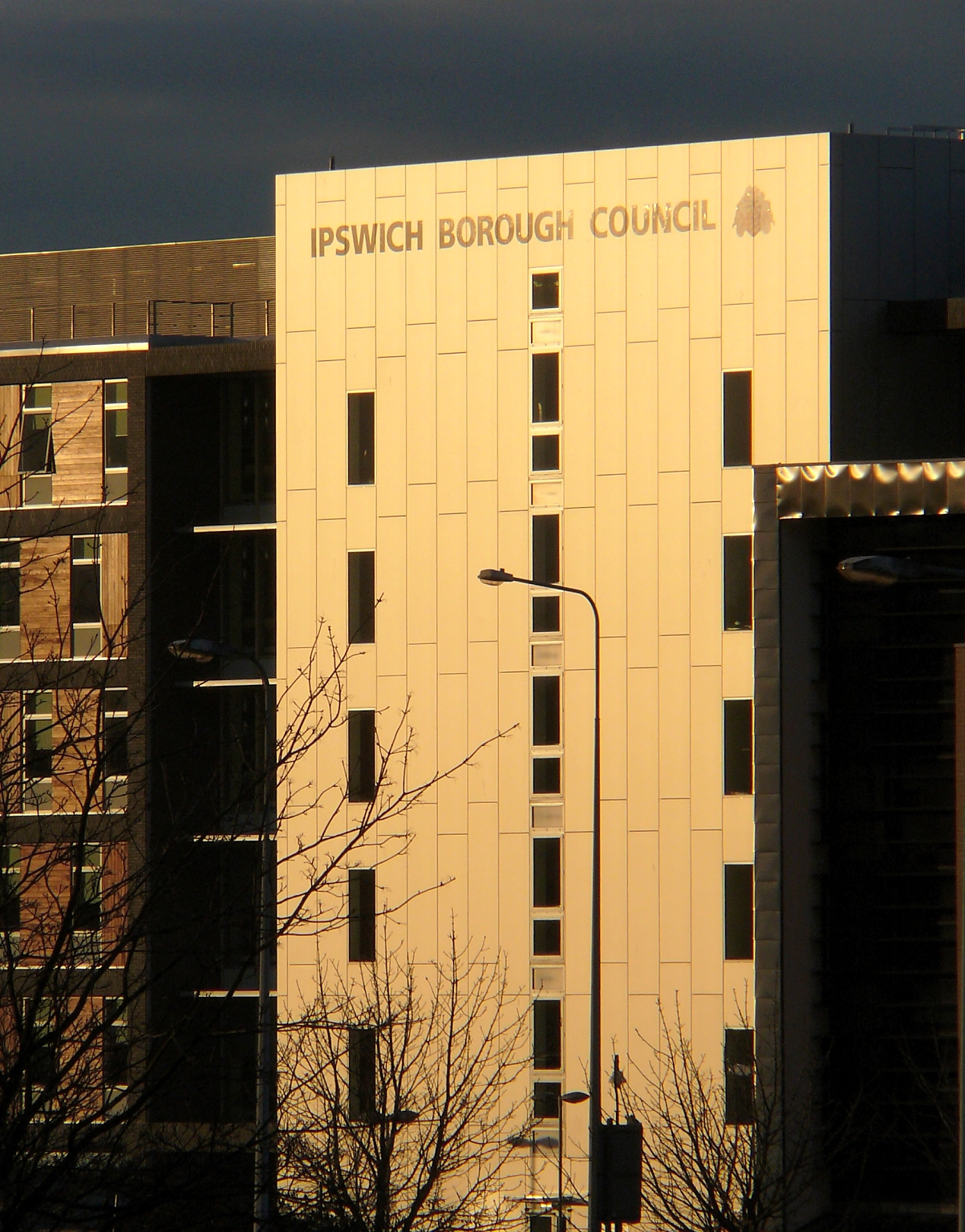
Ipswich Borough Council offices at Grafton House, on Russell Road

Ipswich is governed locally by a two-tier council system. Ipswich Borough Council fulfils district council functions such as refuse collection, housing and planning and Suffolk County Council provides the county council services such as transport, education and social services.

The town is covered by two parliamentary constituencies: Ipswich, which is represented by Labour MP Jack Abbott and covers about 75% of the town, and Central Suffolk and North Ipswich, which covers the remaining 25% and is represented by Conservative MP Patrick Spencer. Parts of the town are in the Babergh and East Suffolk districts, part of the wider urban area is in Mid Suffolk.

In April 2006 the borough council initiated public discussions about the idea of turning the borough into a unitary authority; Ipswich had constituted a county borough from 1889 to 1974, independent of the administrative county of East Suffolk, and this status was not restored by the Banham/Cooksey Commission in the 1990s. Ipswich, Norwich, Exeter and Oxford united to campaign for unitary authority status for the four towns. In March 2007, it was announced that Ipswich was one of 16 shortlisted councils. In December 2007 plans were put into doubt as the government announced that it had "delayed" the unitary bids for Ipswich and Exeter. In July 2008 the Boundary Committee announced its preferred option was for a unitary authority covering Ipswich and the south eastern corner of Suffolk, including Felixstowe.

== Industry ==
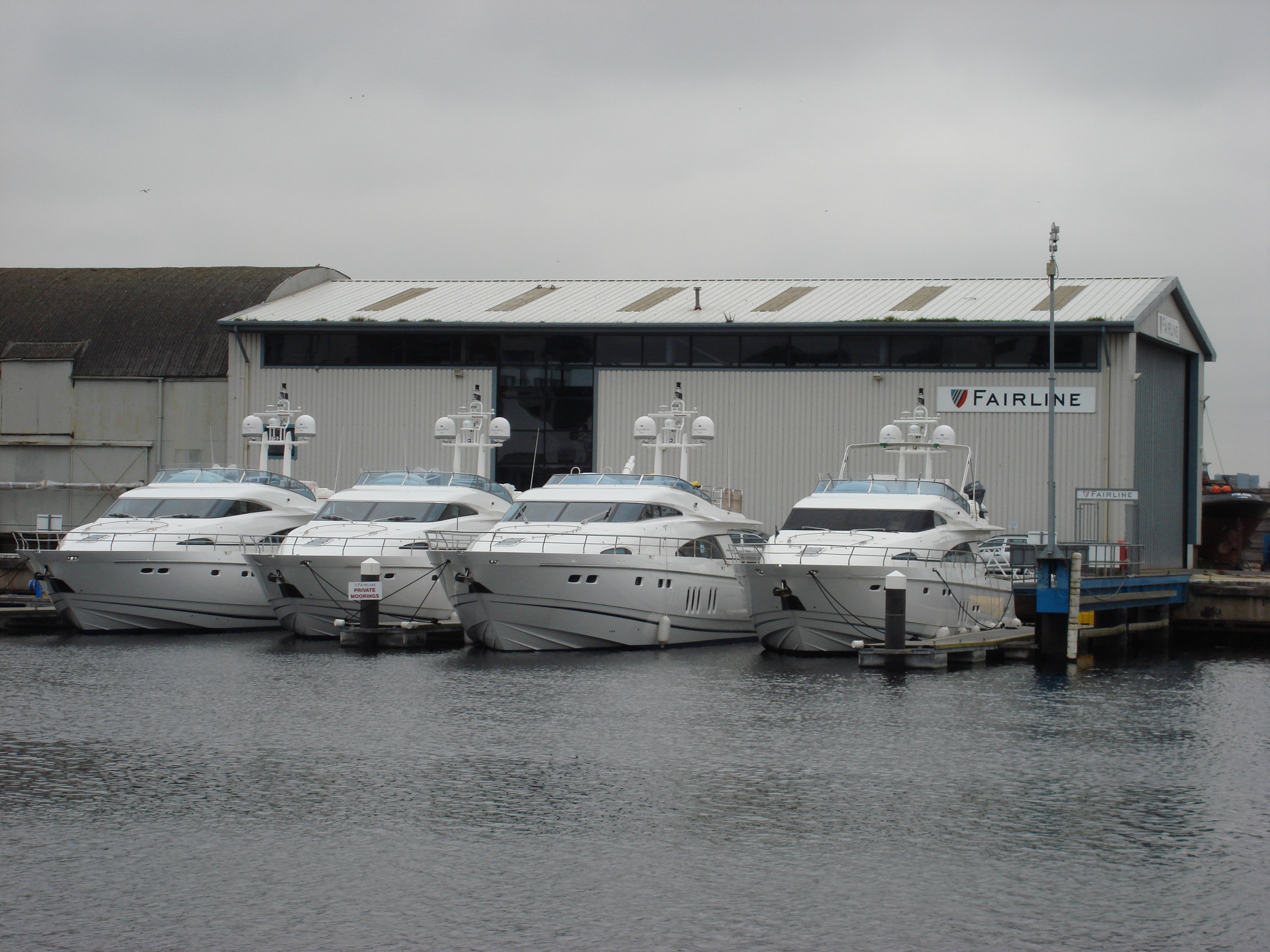
Four Fairline Yachts outside Fairline's Ipswich testing facility

Being the county town of agricultural Suffolk, industry around Ipswich has had a strong farming bias with Ransomes, Sims & Jefferies, one of the most famous agricultural manufacturers, located in the town. The world's first commercial motorised lawnmower was built by Ransomes in 1902. Ransomes & Rapier was a major British manufacturer of railway equipment and later cranes, from 1869 to 1987. There was a sugar beet factory at Ipswich for many years; it was closed in 2001 as part of a rationalisation by British Sugar. This agricultural link is preserved in the Ipswich Town F.C.'s nickname "The Tractor Boys". Phillips & Piper Ltd on Old Foundry Road employed many women who sewed equestrian and hunt jackets for Harrods, Pytchley, and other labels for 130 years, finally closing down in June 1982.

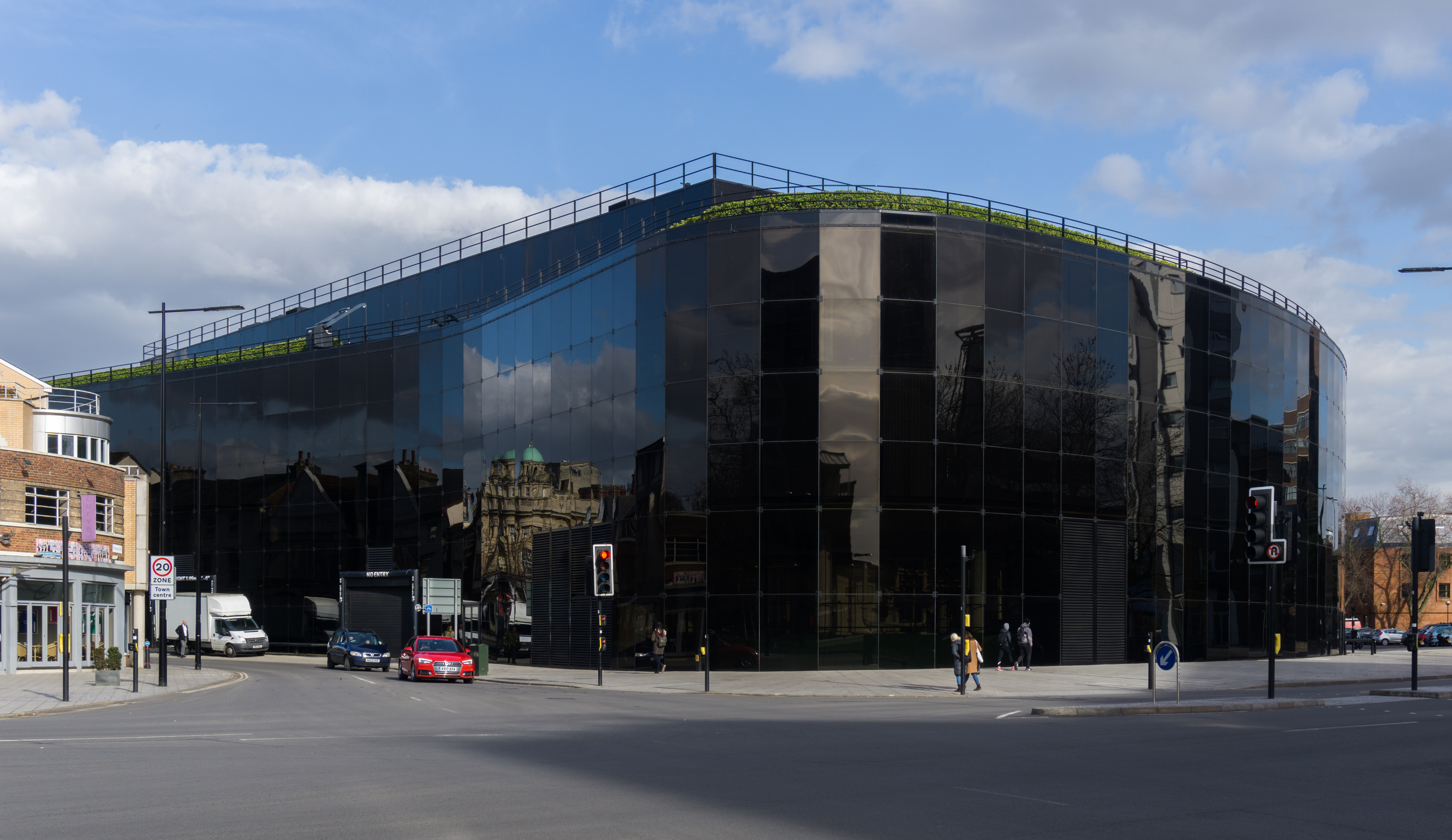
The Willis Building in Ipswich was one of Foster + Partners earliest commissions, built in 1975.

The British Telecom Research Laboratories were located to the east of the town in 1975 at Martlesham Heath; it is now a science park called Adastral Park. The area was originally RAF Martlesham Heath, a World War II airfield. Part of the old airfield is now the site of Suffolk Constabulary's police headquarters.

A key employment sector is insurance, both wholesale and retail sectors. Some of the major players with a key presence in Ipswich include Axa, Churchill, Legal & General, LV and Willis Towers Watson. Access to a skilled and experienced workforce has also led to the establishment of ancillary businesses serving these companies, including call centres dealing with sales and claims.

Ipswich is one of the Haven ports and is still a working port, handling several million tonnes of cargo each year. Prior to decommissioning, HMS Grafton was a regular visitor to the port and has special links with the town and the county of Suffolk. HMS Orwell, named after the river, is also closely linked with Ipswich.

== Demography ==
=== Ethnicity ===
Ethnic group	Year									
Ethnic group	1981 estimations		1991		2001		2011		2021	
Ethnic group	Number	%	Number	%	Number	%	Number	%	Number	%
White: Total	114,118	96.7%	111,691	95.5%	109,381	93.4%	118,596	88.9%	117,757	84.4%
White: British	–	–	–	–	106,309	90.8%	110,624	82.9%	104,208	74.6%
White: Irish	–	–	–	–	706		610	0.5%	587	0.4%
White: Gypsy or Irish Traveller	–	–	–	–	–	–	149		356	0.3%
White: Roma	–	–	–	–	–	–	–	–	663	0.5%
White: Other	–	–	–	–	2,366		7,213	5.4%	11,943	8.6%
Asian or Asian British: Total	–	–	1,609	1.4%	2,562	2.2%	5,740	4.3%	7,611	5.4%
Asian or Asian British: Indian	–	–	464		839		1,801		2,366	1.7%
Asian or Asian British: Pakistani	–	–	73		158		242		376	0.3%
Asian or Asian British: Bangladeshi	–	–	595		913		1,687		2,015	1.4%
Asian or Asian British: Chinese	–	–	312		449		666		749	0.5%
Asian or Asian British: Other Asian	–	–	165		203		1,344		2,105	1.5%
Black or Black British: Total	–	–	2,991	2.6%	2,159	1.8%	3,096	2.3%	4,882	3.5%
Black or Black British: African	–	–	90		247		1,554		2,483	1.8%
Black or Black British: Caribbean	–	–	1,725		1,625		1,025		1,508	1.1%
Black or Black British: Other Black	–	–	1,176		287		517		891	0.6%
Mixed or British Mixed: Total	–	–	–	–	2,658	2.3%	4,816	3.6%	6,409	4.6%
Mixed: White and Black Caribbean	–	–	–	–	1,545		2,579		3,016	2.2%
Mixed: White and Black African	–	–	–	–	234		655		1,151	0.8%
Mixed: White and Asian	–	–	–	–	333		637		820	0.6%
Mixed: Other Mixed	–	–	–	–	546		945		1,422	1.0%
Other: Total	–	–	675	0.6%	309	0.3%	1,136	0.9%	2,984	2.2%
Other: Arab	–	–	–	–	–	–	151		357	0.3%
Other: Any other ethnic group	–	–	675	0.6%	309	0.3%	985		2,627	1.9%
Non-White: Total	3,897	3.3%	5,275	4.5%	7,688	6.6%	14,788	11.1%	21,886	15.6%
Total	118,015	100%	116,966	100%	117,069	100%	133,384	100%	139,643	100%

=== Religion ===
Religion	2001		2011		2021	
Religion	Number	%	Number	%	Number	%
Holds religious beliefs	82,632	70.5	77,048	57.8	67,664	48.5
Christian	79,719	68.1	70,797	53.1	58,898	42.2
Buddhist	216	0.2	495	0.4	596	0.4
Hindu	489	0.4	1,102	0.8	1,342	1.0
Jewish	106	0.1	83	0.1	101	0.1
Muslim	1,462	1.2	3,577	2.7	5,433	3.9
Sikh	246	0.2	343	0.3	456	0.3
Other religion	394	0.3	651	0.5	838	0.6
No religion	23,813	20.3	46,687	35.0	63,256	45.3
Religion not stated	10,624	9.1	9,649	7.2	8,722	6.2
Total population	117,069	100.0	133,384	100.0	139,642	100.0

== Transport ==
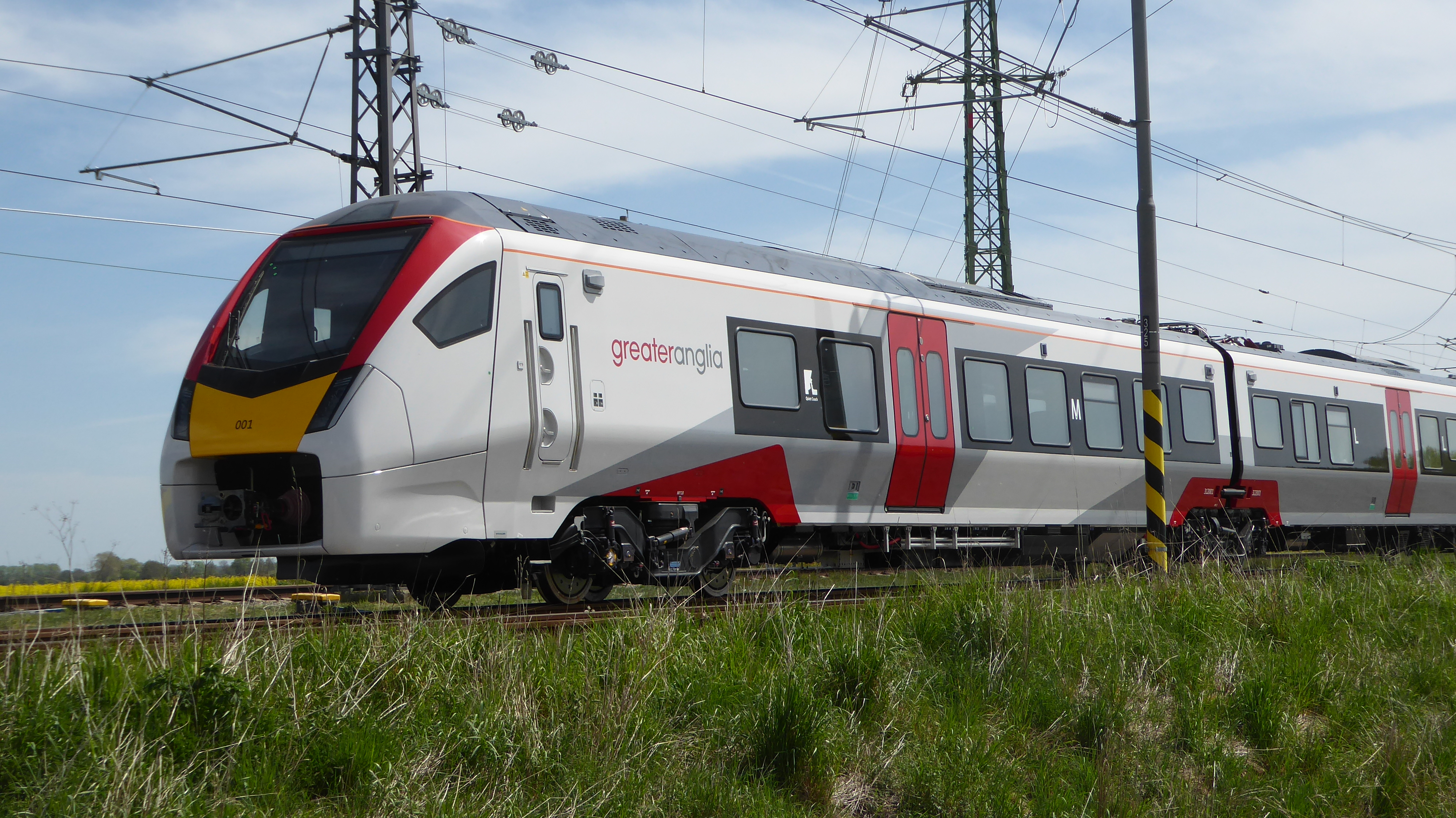
Greater Anglia operates train services in the Ipswich area, including to London Liverpool Street.

Ipswich railway station is on the Great Eastern Main Line from London to Norwich, the East Suffolk Line to Lowestoft and the Felixstowe Branch Line. Trains are run by Greater Anglia, which operates direct services to cities including London, Cambridge, Chelmsford, Norwich and Peterborough. Ipswich engine shed opened in 1846 and closed in 1968. Ipswich is still a signing-on point for locomotive crews and a stabling point. The town has a smaller suburban station at Derby Road east of the town centre, on the Felixstowe branch line.

Ipswich is close to the A12 and the A14 roads. The Orwell Bridge which carries the A14 over the River Orwell connects it to the Port of Felixstowe, a major container port 12 miles (19 km) to the east.

Bus services in Ipswich are operated by Ipswich Buses, First Eastern Counties, Beestons and several smaller companies. Town services operate mainly from Tower Ramparts bus station and regional services from the Ipswich Old Cattle Market bus station. Ipswich Airport closed in 1996.

Ipswich is on Sustrans's National Cycle Route 1 and National Cycle Route 51.

== Sport ==
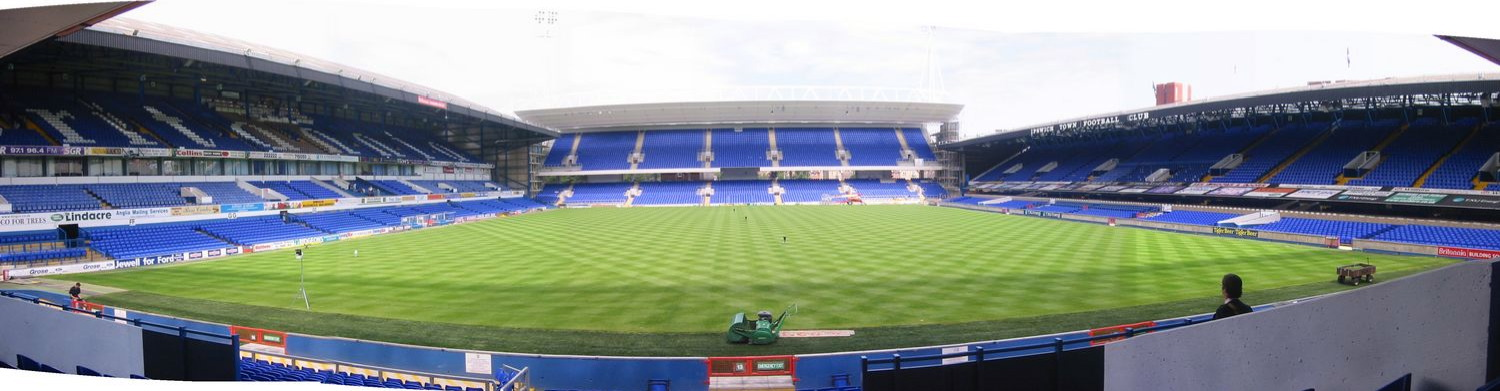
Portman Road, home ground of Ipswich Town

Ipswich's sole professional association football club is Ipswich Town, which was established in 1878 and play at the 30,300-capacity Portman Road stadium. The club returns to the Premier League for the 2026-27 season after finishing second in the EFL Championship. Elected to the Football League in 1938, they have a strong rivalry with Norwich City, and were the previous club of the two most successful England managers; Alf Ramsey, who was buried in the Old Cemetery in the town on his death in 1999, and Bobby Robson. Ipswich won the First Division title in 1961–62 in their first season as a top division club during Ramsey's reign, as well as the 1978 FA Cup and the 1981 UEFA Cup under Robson. The club are also undefeated at home in all European competitions, having won 25 and drawn six of 31 matches.

Ipswich is also home to several non-League football clubs, including Ipswich Wanderers and Whitton United in the Eastern Counties League, and Achilles, Crane Sports, and Ransomes Sports among others in the Suffolk & Ipswich League. The town has representation in both codes of rugby. There are two rugby union teams – Ipswich RFC, who play in London 2 North East League, and Ipswich YM RUFC – and one rugby league side – Ipswich Rhinos, who play in the Rugby League Conference. Ipswich Cardinals are an American football team, playing in the South-East Conference of BAFACL 1; the second tier of the BAFA Community Leagues.

The speedway team, the Ipswich Witches, have ridden at Foxhall Stadium on the outskirts of Ipswich since 1951 and have won the top-tier league title five times, the knock-out cup six times and the second-tier knock-out cup twice. The stadium is also used regularly for Hot Rod, Stock Car and Banger racing events, hosting major events throughout the year on the stadium's outer tarmac oval.

Ipswich Gymnastics Centre is one of only three fully Olympic accredited gymnastics facilities in the UK.

Ipswich has a rich history of public swimming. During the 1830s, there were at least three designated swimming places – one was near St Cement's, the second was next to St Mary-At-The Quay and the third not far from Stoke Bridge. These were all closed in the late 1830s during the building of the wet dock. A designated enclosed area of the River Orwell, called Stoke Bathing Place, was created to cater for the swimmers. It was damaged in the floods of 1953 but maps show the swimming place still in situ as late as 1973. Ipswich Swimming, formed in 1884 as Ipswich Swimming Club, used the Stoke Swimming Place. Fore Street Swimming Pool opened in 1894. The pool is still in use and is the second oldest swimming pool in use in the UK. Pipers Vale Pool opened in 1937 after replacing the West End Bathing Place, which had closed in 1936 due to fears that it was polluting the River Orwell. Broom Hill pool opened, in 1986, which was prompted to serve the western side of the town. It closed in 2002 but is about to be restored with the plan of opening again in 2025/26. St Matthew's Baths was opened in 1924 and closed in 1984 when Crown Pools opened, which is still in use. The Ipswich Swimming Club, is based there although they use the Fore Street swimming pool, too. The most successful Ipswich Swimming Club member is World Championship gold medallist Karen Pickering. There are plans for a new "low carbon aquatics centre" with the intention of opening next to Ipswich Town Football Club in 2027.

Ipswich had a racecourse which ran a mix of flat and National Hunt races.

== Education ==
=== Schools ===
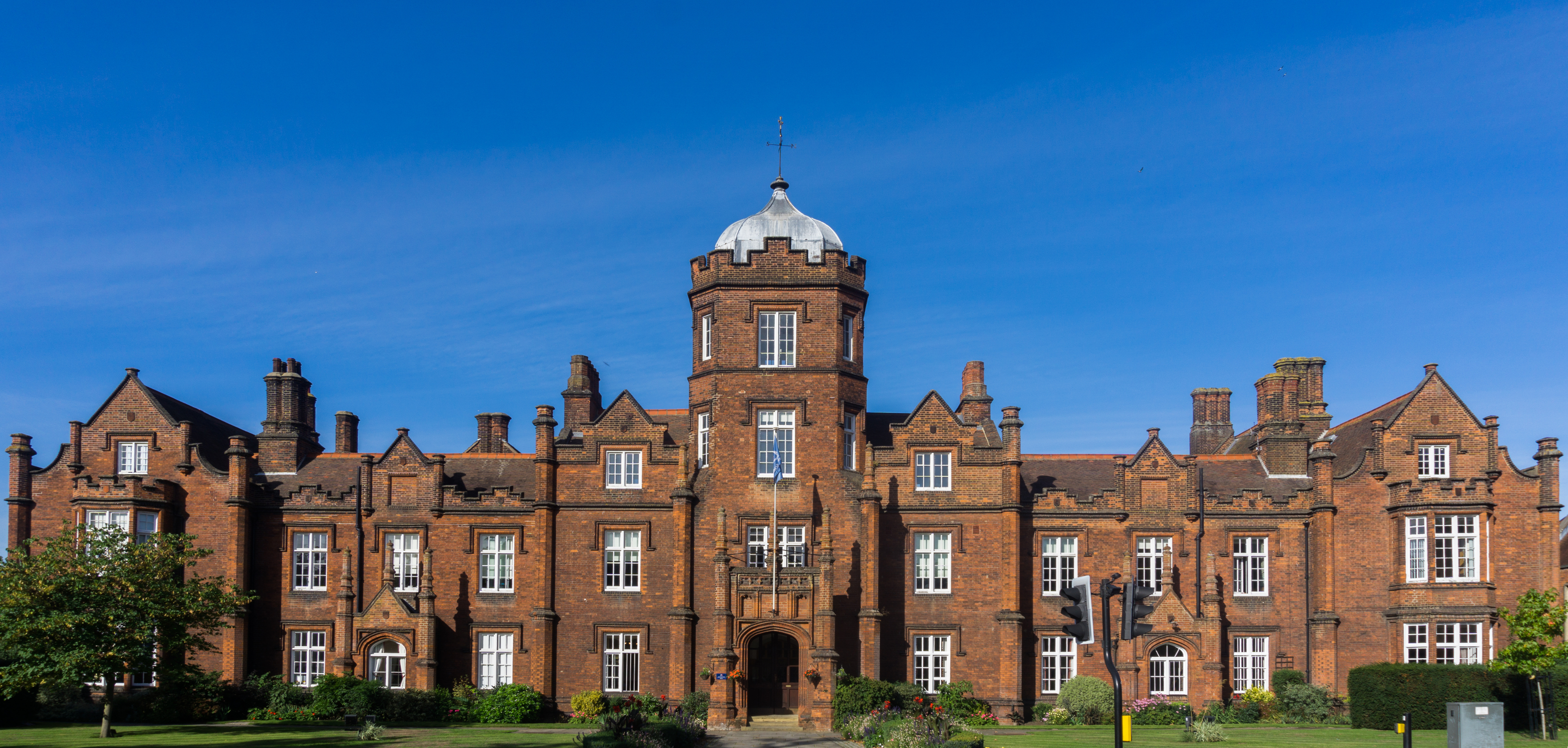
Ipswich School was established in 1399.

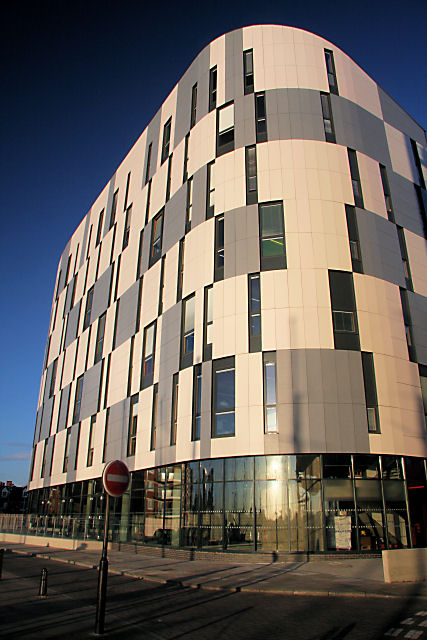
The Waterfront Building of the University of Suffolk

State-funded secondary schools include comprehensive schools such as Copleston High School, St Alban's Catholic High School, Holbrook Academy, Holbrook Primary and Northgate High School and academies such as Ipswich Academy and Chantry Academy. Ipswich is also home to several independent schools, including Royal Hospital School, Ipswich School (both are co-educational and members of the Headmasters' and Headmistresses' Conference), Ipswich High School (has recently changed from girls only to girls and boys) and St Joseph's College (Catholic, co-educational) which hosts an international summer camp.

=== Further and higher education ===
Suffolk New College is a further education college located in Ipswich, serving students from the town and wider area. There is also a sixth form college, One, which serves students from the same area.

Ipswich is the location of the University of Suffolk, Suffolk's first Higher Education Institution (HEI), established in 2007. It was originally University Campus Suffolk, a collaborative venture involving the University of Essex in Colchester, the University of East Anglia in Norwich, various further education colleges and Suffolk County Council. However, the university was granted its own degree awarding powers in November 2015, and in May 2016 it was awarded university status. The university was renamed to the University of Suffolk in August 2016, prior to its former name University Campus Suffolk.

== Climate ==
Ipswich experiences an oceanic climate, like the rest of the British Isles, with a narrow range of temperature and rainfall spread evenly throughout the year. One of the two nearest for which data is available is East Bergholt, about 7 miles (11 km) south west of the town centre and at a similar elevation, and similar river valley/estuary situation. The average July maximum of 23.2 °C (73.8 °F) is the third-highest for a major settlement in the country, behind London and Colchester, illustrating the relative warmth of the area during the summer part of the year. The record maximum is 35.2 °C (95.4 °F), set during August 2003. Typically, 24.9 days of the year will record a maximum temperature of 25.1 °C (77.2 °F) or above, and the warmest day of the year should reach 30.0 °C (86.0 °F), on average.

The absolute minimum is −16.1 °C (3.0 °F), set in January 1963, although frosts have been recorded in all months except July, August and September. In an average year, 55.33 nights will report an air frost. The lowest temperature to be recorded in recent years was −14.5 °C (5.9 °F) during December 2010.

As with much of East Anglia, rainfall is low, averaging 569.3mm in a typical year, with 103.8 days of the year reporting over 1mm of rain. All averages refer to the period 1971–2000.

The weather station at Levington is even closer than East Bergholt at 5.8 miles (9.4 km) from the town centre further down the river estuary on the way to Felixstowe. It has a slightly more marine climate than East Bergholt, with slightly lower highs and milder lows throughout the year in the 1981–2010 average period. It is slightly less prone to frosts, averaging 35.5 such occurrences in a calendar year. Sunshine levels at 1,707.7 hours per annum are relatively high for the British Isles, but not abnormal for southern parts of England.

Wattisham is 26 kilometres (16 miles) from Ipswich, but has a higher altitude of 282 feet (86 m). As a result, high temperatures there are a little lower than East Bergholt and Levington, but lows are similar. In average year, there are around 43 nights of frost recorded at Wattisham (as well as two days of frost), and one day when the temperature exceeds 30 °C (86 °F).

Climate data for East Bergholt, elevation 7 m, 1971–2000, extremes 1960–
Month	Jan	Feb	Mar	Apr	May	Jun	Jul	Aug	Sep	Oct	Nov	Dec	Year
Record high °C (°F)	15.9 (60.6)	18.1 (64.6)	23.1 (73.6)	25.6 (78.1)	28.9 (84.0)	33.5 (92.3)	35.0 (95.0)	35.2 (95.4)	31.5 (88.7)	29.0 (84.2)	20.6 (69.1)	15.9 (60.6)	35.2 (95.4)
Mean daily maximum °C (°F)	7.3 (45.1)	7.5 (45.5)	10.4 (50.7)	13.5 (56.3)	17.5 (63.5)	21.2 (70.2)	23.2 (73.8)	23.0 (73.4)	20.1 (68.2)	14.9 (58.8)	10.3 (50.5)	7.9 (46.2)	14.7 (58.5)
Mean daily minimum °C (°F)	0.9 (33.6)	0.8 (33.4)	2.3 (36.1)	3.5 (38.3)	6.2 (43.2)	10.0 (50.0)	12.3 (54.1)	12.2 (54.0)	9.8 (49.6)	6.6 (43.9)	3.1 (37.6)	1.6 (34.9)	5.8 (42.4)
Record low °C (°F)	−16.1 (3.0)	−13.9 (7.0)	−11.1 (12.0)	−5.8 (21.6)	−4 (25)	−1.1 (30.0)	2.3 (36.1)	2.2 (36.0)	0.0 (32.0)	−5.5 (22.1)	−8.4 (16.9)	−14.5 (5.9)	−16.1 (3.0)
Average precipitation mm (inches)	52.14 (2.05)	34.07 (1.34)	41.63 (1.64)	42.06 (1.66)	41.80 (1.65)	51.86 (2.04)	35.50 (1.40)	49.12 (1.93)	51.31 (2.02)	58.14 (2.29)	56.25 (2.21)	54.52 (2.15)	569.31 (22.41)
Source: KNMI

Climate data for Levington, elevation 22 m, 5.8 miles (9.4 km) from Ipswich, 1991–2020 averages
Month	Jan	Feb	Mar	Apr	May	Jun	Jul	Aug	Sep	Oct	Nov	Dec	Year
Mean daily maximum °C (°F)	7.6 (45.7)	8.0 (46.4)	10.5 (50.9)	13.8 (56.8)	17.0 (62.6)	20.0 (68.0)	22.7 (72.9)	22.5 (72.5)	19.4 (66.9)	15.2 (59.4)	10.8 (51.4)	8.1 (46.6)	14.7 (58.5)
Mean daily minimum °C (°F)	2.5 (36.5)	2.2 (36.0)	3.5 (38.3)	4.9 (40.8)	8.1 (46.6)	10.9 (51.6)	13.3 (55.9)	13.2 (55.8)	11.2 (52.2)	8.6 (47.5)	5.1 (41.2)	2.8 (37.0)	7.2 (45.0)
Average precipitation mm (inches)	47.12 (1.86)	42.05 (1.66)	37.29 (1.47)	34.78 (1.37)	39.21 (1.54)	50.51 (1.99)	49.26 (1.94)	47.93 (1.89)	48.68 (1.92)	59.87 (2.36)	55.45 (2.18)	56.75 (2.23)	568.90 (22.40)
Mean monthly sunshine hours	68.2	85.3	126.6	184.6	222.4	214.5	227.4	202.3	158.4	119.0	73.4	60.4	1,741.6
Source: Met Office

Climate data for Wattisham, elevation 86 m, 1991–2020, extremes 1973–
Month	Jan	Feb	Mar	Apr	May	Jun	Jul	Aug	Sep	Oct	Nov	Dec	Year
Record high °C (°F)	14.4 (57.9)	17.6 (63.7)	20.4 (68.7)	25.6 (78.1)	27.6 (81.7)	33.0 (91.4)	35.7 (96.3)	35.3 (95.5)	29.7 (85.5)	28.2 (82.8)	18.1 (64.6)	15.0 (59.0)	35.7 (96.3)
Mean daily maximum °C (°F)	6.7 (44.1)	7.4 (45.3)	10.0 (50.0)	13.3 (55.9)	16.5 (61.7)	19.5 (67.1)	22.1 (71.8)	21.9 (71.4)	18.7 (65.7)	14.4 (57.9)	10.0 (50.0)	7.1 (44.8)	14.1 (57.4)
Mean daily minimum °C (°F)	1.4 (34.5)	1.2 (34.2)	2.6 (36.7)	4.3 (39.7)	7.2 (45.0)	10.1 (50.2)	12.3 (54.1)	12.3 (54.1)	9.9 (49.8)	7.5 (45.5)	4.2 (39.6)	2.0 (35.6)	6.3 (43.3)
Record low °C (°F)	−15 (5)	−10 (14)	−7.1 (19.2)	−4.6 (23.7)	−2.3 (27.9)	0.5 (32.9)	1.0 (33.8)	4.0 (39.2)	−1.7 (28.9)	−3.5 (25.7)	−6.2 (20.8)	−12.8 (9.0)	−15 (5)
Average precipitation mm (inches)	41.92 (1.65)	38.55 (1.52)	45.50 (1.79)	32.71 (1.29)	47.15 (1.86)	46.04 (1.81)	49.25 (1.94)	61.15 (2.41)	43.89 (1.73)	55.74 (2.19)	57.26 (2.25)	48.13 (1.89)	567.291 (22.33)
Source: Meteostat

== People ==
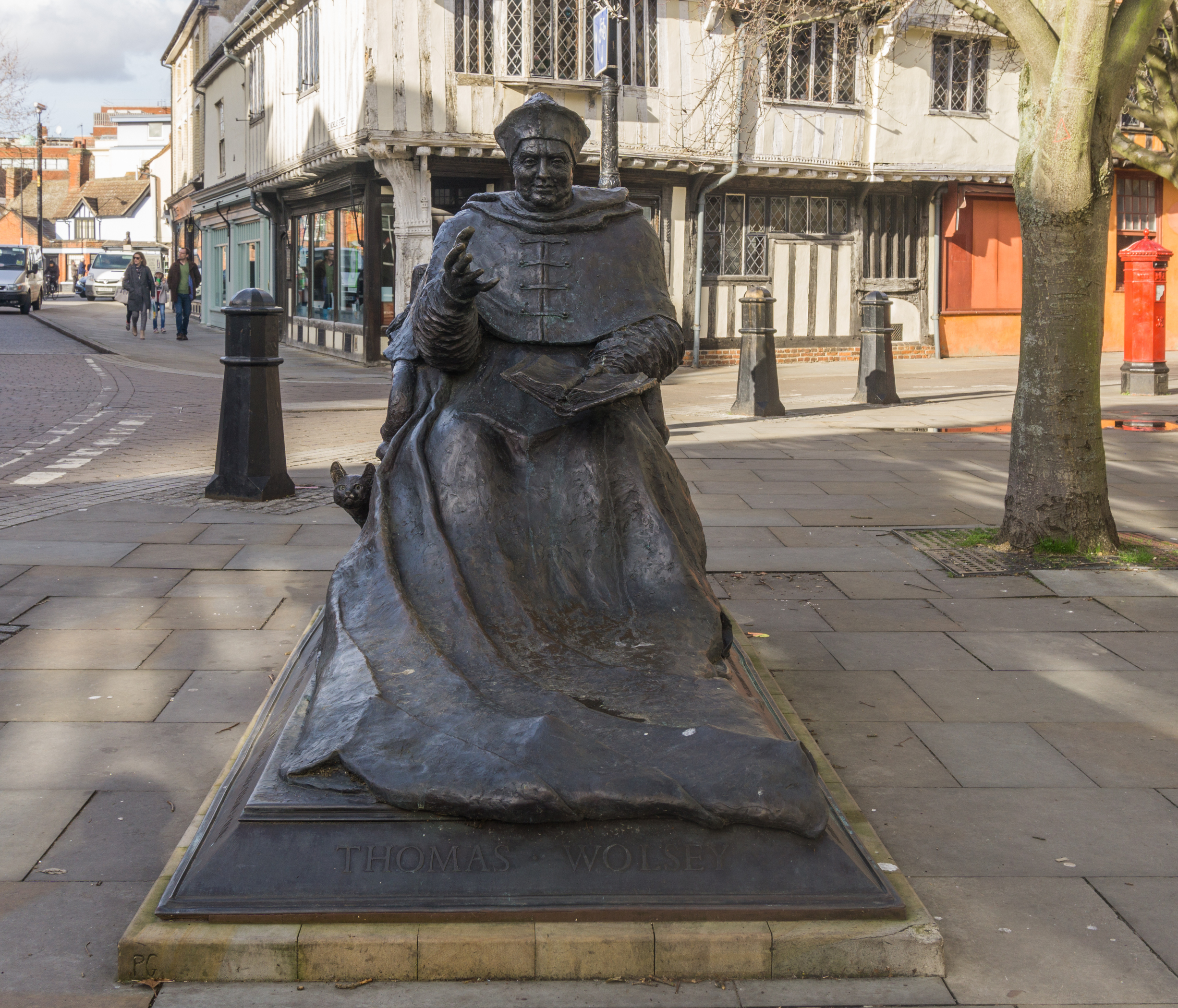
Statue of Thomas Wolsey on St Peters Street

The Tudor Cardinal Thomas Wolsey was born in the town. Sir Samuel Mayart, the judge and political theorist, was born in Ipswich in 1585. The artist Thomas Gainsborough and the cartoonist "Giles" worked here. Horatio, Lord Nelson, became Steward of Ipswich, and Margaret Catchpole began her adventurous career here. The abolitionists Richard Dykes Alexander and Thomas Clarkson had strong associations with the area and the Royal Navy admirals Benjamin William Page and Samuel Reeve were born and died in the town. Alf Ramsey and Bobby Robson were both successful managers of Ipswich Town. Ipswich was the birthplace in 1741 of Sarah Trimmer, née Kirby, writer and critic of children's literature and among the first to introduce pictorial material and animals and the natural world into it. The actor and director Ralph Fiennes was born in Ipswich, as was the actor Sam Claflin, who appeared in The Hunger Games and Peaky Blinders.

Actor and director Richard Ayoade, best known for his role as Maurice Moss in The IT Crowd, was brought up in Ipswich, as was the ceramic artist Blanche Georgiana Vulliamy, and the musician Nandi Bushell. Hugh Catchpole, a noted educationist with over 60 years of association with military schools and colleges in India and Pakistan, was born in Ipswich. Jeremy Wade, an extreme angler known for hosting TV shows such as River Monsters and Dark Waters, was born in Ipswich. Composer Christopher Wright (1954–2024) was born in Ipswich, as was relief worker Grace Vulliamy (1878–1957). Actor Jane Lapotaire (1944-2026) known for numerous roles with the Royal Shakespeare Company including the title role in Piaf by Pam Gems was born in Ipswich. Alternative rock band Basement is from Ipswich. Controversial punk duo Bob Vylan was formed in Ipswich in 2017

== International relations ==
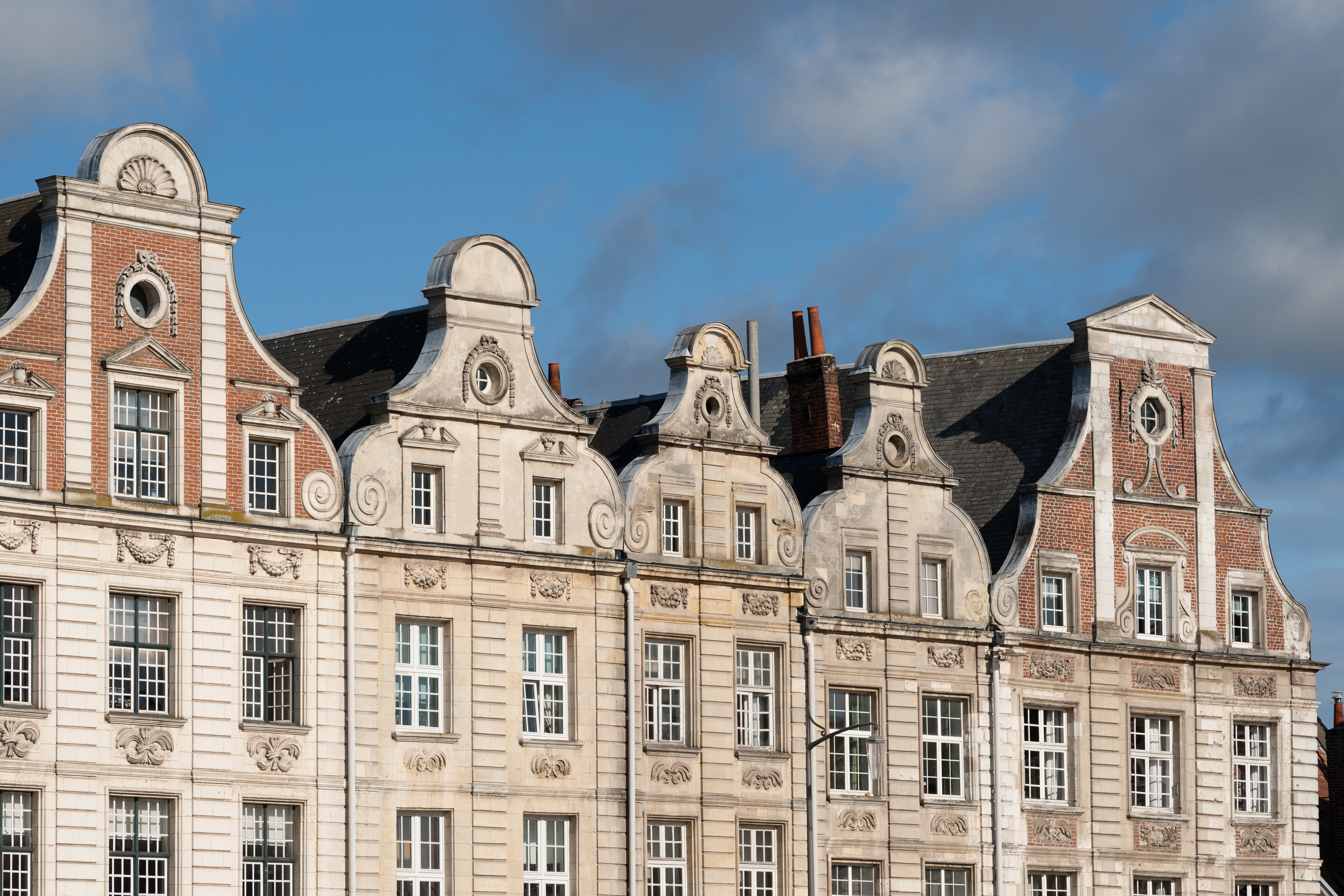
Arras and Ipswich have been twinned since 1994

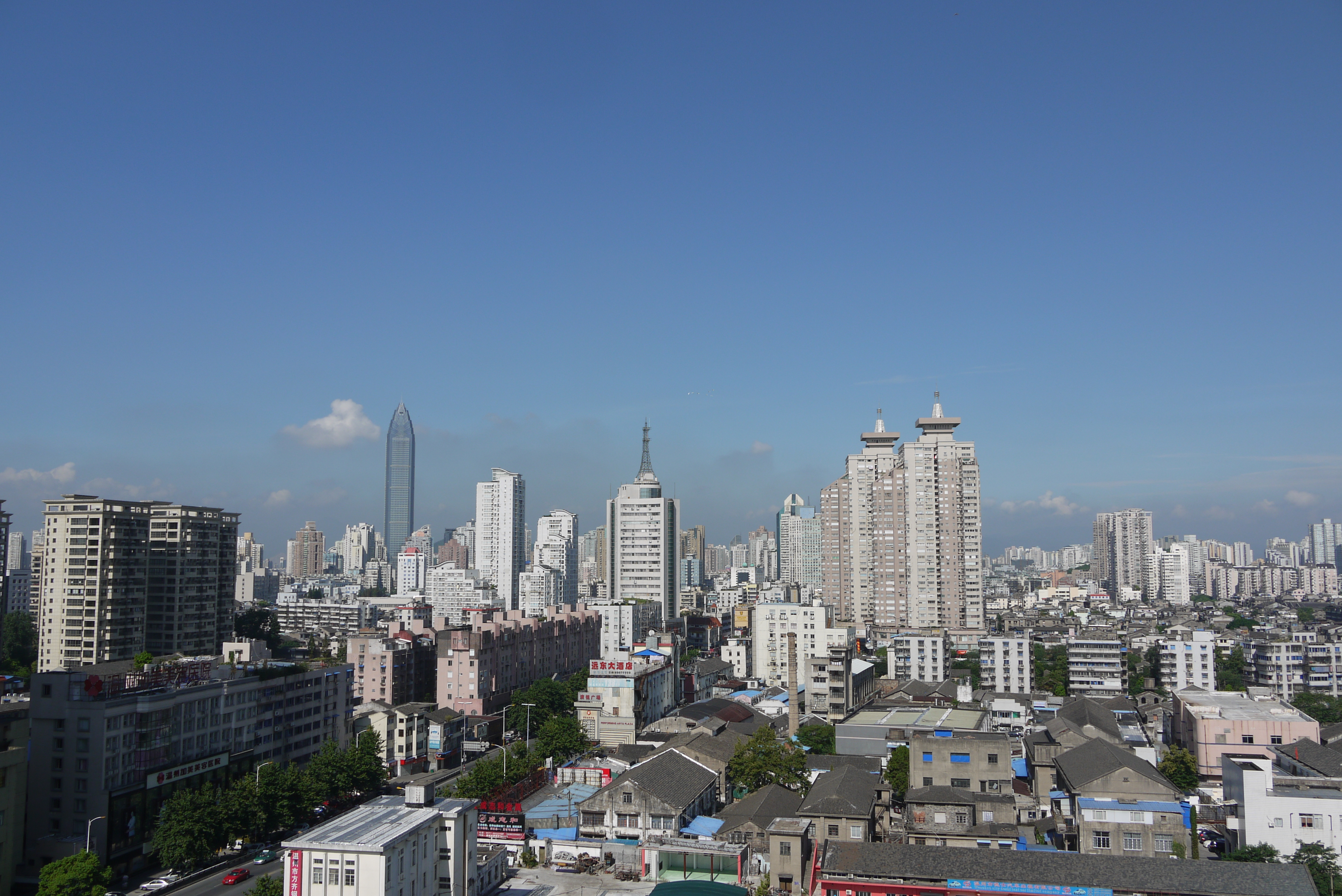
Wenzhou and Ipswich have been twinned since 2014

=== Twin towns ===
Ipswich is twinned with:

- Arras, France, since 1994
- Wenzhou, China since 2014

=== "The English Lady" ===
Before the English Reformation, Ipswich had the second-most visited Marian shrine in England. Though a replica statue was made, the original is believed to have been transported to:

- Nettuno, Italy

=== Portal location ===
As the fifth portals location in the world, and the first in the United Kingdom, Ipswich is connected to four cities around the world as of the 22nd October 2025:

- Vilnius, Lithuania
- Lublin, Poland
- Dublin, Republic of Ireland
- Philadelphia, United States
- Manila, Philippines

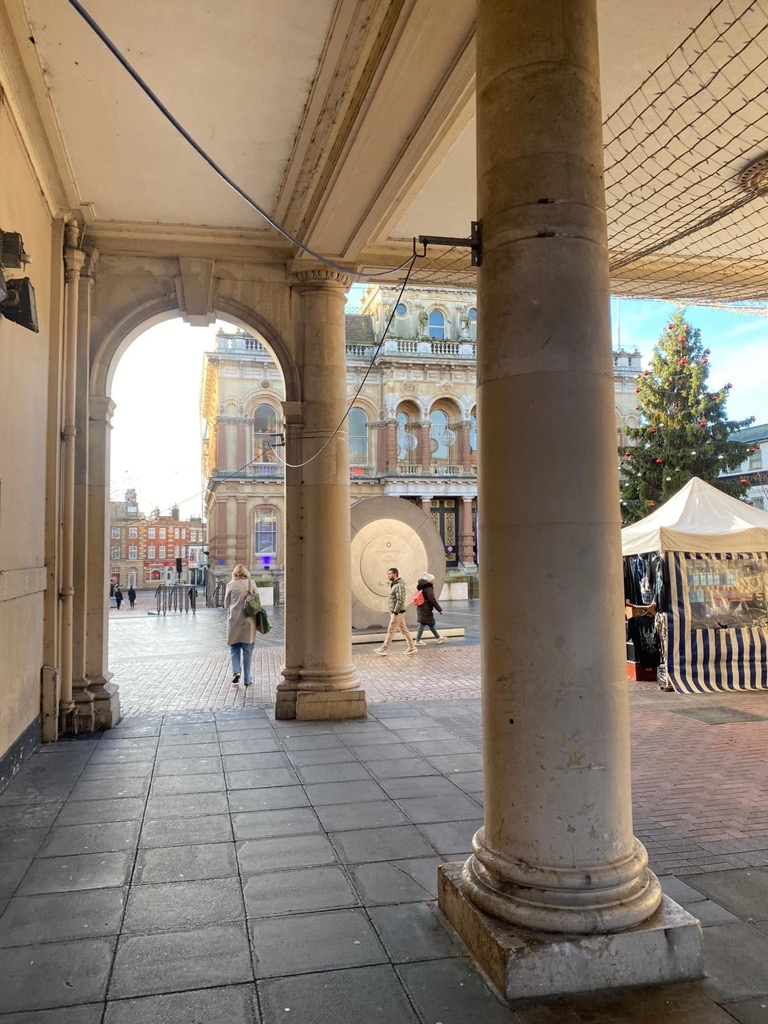
The Ipswich Portal, as seen through Lloyd's Archway

== In popular culture ==
- In Serena Valentino's Villains novel Poor Unfortunate Soul: A Tale of the Sea Witch, Ursula appears in Ipswich and proceeds to turn the citizens of the town into twisted sea creatures, reminiscent of the horror tales of author HP Lovecraft. She is stopped upon the arrival of King Triton.
- In the Dead Parrot sketch by Monty Python's Flying Circus, the customer is sent to Bolton for a replacement but was falsely told he was in Ipswich: "C: This is Bolton, is it? O: (with a fake moustache) No, it's Ipswich."
- In the 1934 Dennis Wheatley novel Black August the main characters, after a series of adventures, are held prisoners in Ipswich where a local Communist government has been set up; they are sentenced to death as enemies of the State, but are freed when the revolution is overthrown.

== See also ==
- List of college towns
- List of English districts
- List of locations in Australia with an English name
- List of towns in England
- List of U.S. places named after non-U.S. places
