= Fore Street Swimming Pool =

Victorian swimming pool in Ipswich, Suffolk, England

Coordinates: 52°03′14″N 1°09′39″E

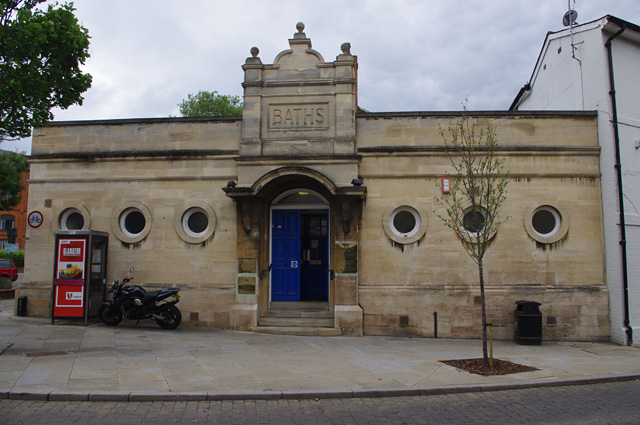
- Interactive map of Fore Street Swimming Pool
- Location: Fore St, Ipswich, Suffolk, IP4 1JZ
- Dimensions: Length: 27 yards (25 m); Width: 7 yards (6.4 m)

Construction
- Opened: 4 March 1894

Fore Street Swimming Pool (formerly known as Fore Street Baths) is a swimming venue in Ipswich that opened on 4 March 1894.

== Design, construction and funding ==
It was designed by Ipswich born architect Thomas Cotmen and built by local philanthropist and builder T. Parkington & Sons Builders. Inside the Victorian stone facade, brick building and slate and glass roof the pool measuring 25x7 yards with 5 lanes (originally 6) and had a number of communal baths. There were wooden changing cubicles with stairs going to a viewing are around the pool. The modern changing cubicles on each side of the pool are now present and a first-floor communal changing area where the old boiler used to be located. The build was funded by the Corporation of Ipswich (to a sum of £3100) along with a donation of the land plus £1200 from Felix Thornley Cobbold. It was originally opened by Ipswich Mayor Samuel Richard Anness.

== Background ==
The poorly built homes for the families of hundreds of workers at the expanding Ipswich engineering companies had no bathrooms, or in many cases running water. The Baths and Washhouses Act 1846 was created to encourage the construction of indoor pools and Fore Street Baths was one of 600 built between 1880 and 1914 in Britain.

== Restoration and current use ==
Fore Street Swimming Pool was fully refurbished in 2001 and is now used for recreational swimming, swimming lessons, Octopush scuba diving, snorkelling and life support lessons.

== Status ==
Fore Street Swimming Pool is the second oldest operating pool in England.
