= Stoke Bathing Place =

Outdoor swimming venue in Ipswich, England

Coordinates: 52.0436°N 1.1587°E

Stoke Bathing Place was an outdoor swimming venue in Ipswich, Suffolk.

== Location and features ==
During the 1830s, the Ipswich Wet Dock was being constructed. This caused the closure of Ipswich's three swimming venues (one was near St Cement's, the second was next to St Mary-At-The Quay and the third not far from Stoke Bridge). The replacement was Stoke Bathing Place, which was an enclosed area within the West Bank of the River Orwell. It had an estimated size of 90x30m. The bathing pool was refreshed by tidal waters.

The bathing area is shown as early as 1896 on a maps of Ipswich and also from 1908 and up to 1973. In photos from 1908, white changing cabins and diving jetties were present.

Stoke Bathing Place were extensively damaged during the Ipswich Floods of 1953 but the other outside bathing venues were already open for use (Broomhill Pool and Piper's Vale).

== WWI Zeppelin raid ==
On the 1 April 1916, during the Zeppelin raids of WWI, L-15, commanded by Kapitänleutnant Joachim Breithaupt, dropped two bombs toward the dock areas. One of the bombs landed on the site of the Stoke Bathing Place where two were killed and one injured.
