= HMS Orwell =

Four ships of the Royal Navy have borne the name HMS Orwell, after the River Orwell in Suffolk, England

- HMS Orwell (1866) was a Britomart-class wooden screw gunboat launched in 1866 and sold in 1890.
- HMS Orwell (1901) was a B-class torpedo boat destroyer launched in 1899, purchased in 1901 and sold in 1920.
- HMS Orwell (G98) was an O-class destroyer launched in 1942, converted to a Type 16 frigate in 1952 and sold in 1965.
- HMS Orwell (M1219/M2011) was a River-class minesweeper launched in 1985. She was sold to Guyana in 2001 and renamed Essequibo.
