= West End Bathing Place =

Coordinates: 52.0545°N 1.1379°E

West End Bathing Place was an outdoor swimming venue in Ipswich, Suffolk.

== Location and features ==
A bathing area for the West End of Ipswich was discussed as early as 1888 and was finally constructed in 1893 by the Ipswich Corporation. The lagoon was excavated from the land beside the River Gipping and had a concrete bottom. The depth of the pool was between 3 and 10 feet.

The bathing place was open from 08:00 to sunset on weekdays and 06:00 to 10:00 on Sundays. Wednesdays from 08:00 to sunset and Fridays from 08:00 to 13:00 were reserved for ladies-only swimming.

Maps show the bathing place as early as 1902, located where the freshwater of River Gipping meets the brackish River Orwell, close to the southern end of the now Sir Alf Ramsey Way. The bathing place was at a natural part of the river that filled at high tide to provide ideal shallow swimming.

The Ipswich Swimming Club are known to have practiced there in 1913, where they held their West End Bathing Place plunging competition.

In the Ipswich in 1912: King Edward Memorial Sanatorium souvenir book, from the East Anglian Daily Times, is a photo of the bathing place, complete with changing rooms along one side.

Maps from 1930 continue to show the lagoon, and archive images from Britain from Above show the lagoon in 1933.

== Tragedies ==
On 6 Aug 1898, there was a report of a mysterious drowning in the bathing place. The last person to see John Baxter before he drowned was Arthur Barker Welham. Welham had asked him if he had anything in hand (meaning employment) and deceased replied, "No, the world is using me very rough. I have only misery to live for, and I shall not stand it any longer than tonight."

In 1912, the Ipswich Evening Star reported that Walter Edward James Hood, aged 12, attempted to save the life of 20-year-old Leonard Knights, who had disappeared beneath the surface at the West End Bathing Place while swimming. Unfortunately, Knights died. Hood was awarded a purse of money for his efforts.

== Closure ==
West End Bathing Place was closed in 1936 due to pollution from the river. It is now the location of an MG car showroom.
