= Castle Hill, Ipswich, Suffolk =

Coordinates: 52.081827°N 1.140561°E

Castle Hill
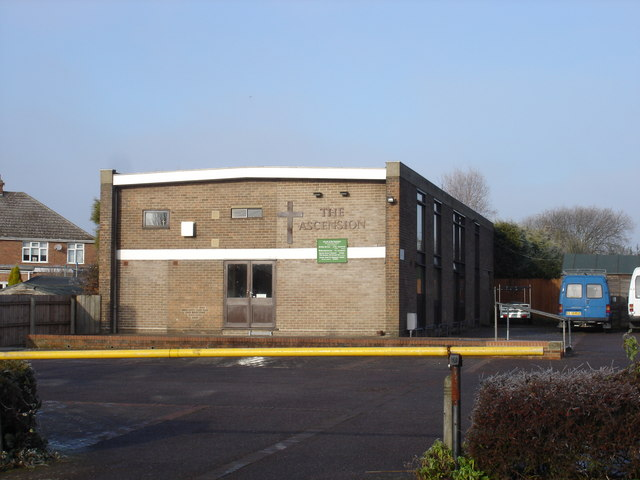
- The Ascension Church

- Location within Suffolk
- District: Ipswich
- Shire county: Suffolk
- Region: East
- Country: England
- Sovereign state: United Kingdom
- Post town: Ipswich
- Postcode district: IP1
- Dialling code: 01473
- Police: Suffolk
- Fire: Suffolk
- Ambulance: East of England
- UK Parliament: Central Suffolk and North Ipswich

Castle Hill is a suburb of the town of Ipswich, partly in the ward of Castle Hill, in the Ipswich district in Suffolk, England. It is the site of the Castle Hill Roman villa. This area has for centuries been called Castle Hill but there never was a castle. Castlehill Farm stood just yards away prior to the housing scheme.

== Amenities ==
Castle Hill has a primary and secondary school, a post office, a pub, two churches and an arcade of shops on both Fircroft Road and Garrick Way.

Castle Hill United Reformed Church was completed in 1956.
