= Concertus =

British architectural and planning firm

Concertus Design and Property Consultants are formerly part of the property department of Suffolk County Council based in Endeavour House, Ipswich, England. They are an architectural and planning firm which, although independent, has many contracts with Suffolk County Council, including schools. In 2014 they were listed in the top 50 for best architectural and construction firms in the sector in England. Concertus Design and Property Consultants biggest work is designing and building schools for the council, and adding extensions to existing buildings such as at Kesgrave High School. The firm oversaw the project, and provided advice.

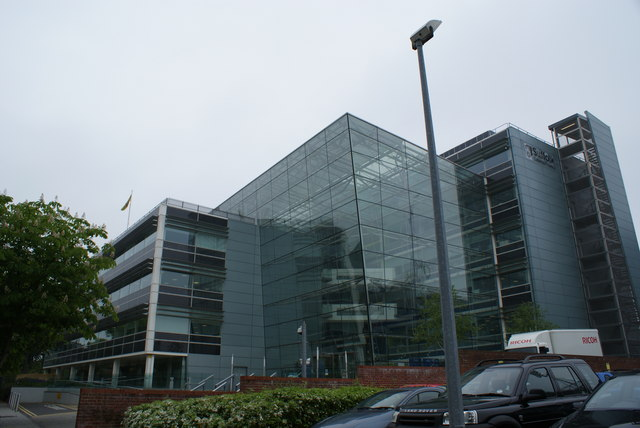
Endeavour House the home of Suffolk County Council and Concertus Design and Property Consultants

== Notable buildings ==
- The Brandon Center
- Kesgrave High School
- St Christopher's - Red Lodge
- Clements Primary - Haverhill
- Westfield Primary - Haverhill
- Heath Primary - Kesgrave
- Whitehouse CP - Ipswich
- Felixstowe Academy
- Ipswich Academy -
- Northfields Primary School
- Poplars Primary School
- Reydon and Southwold Community Fire Station
