= 10 Reavell Place =

37 m, 12 storey residential building on the River Gipping, Ipswich, Suffolk, England

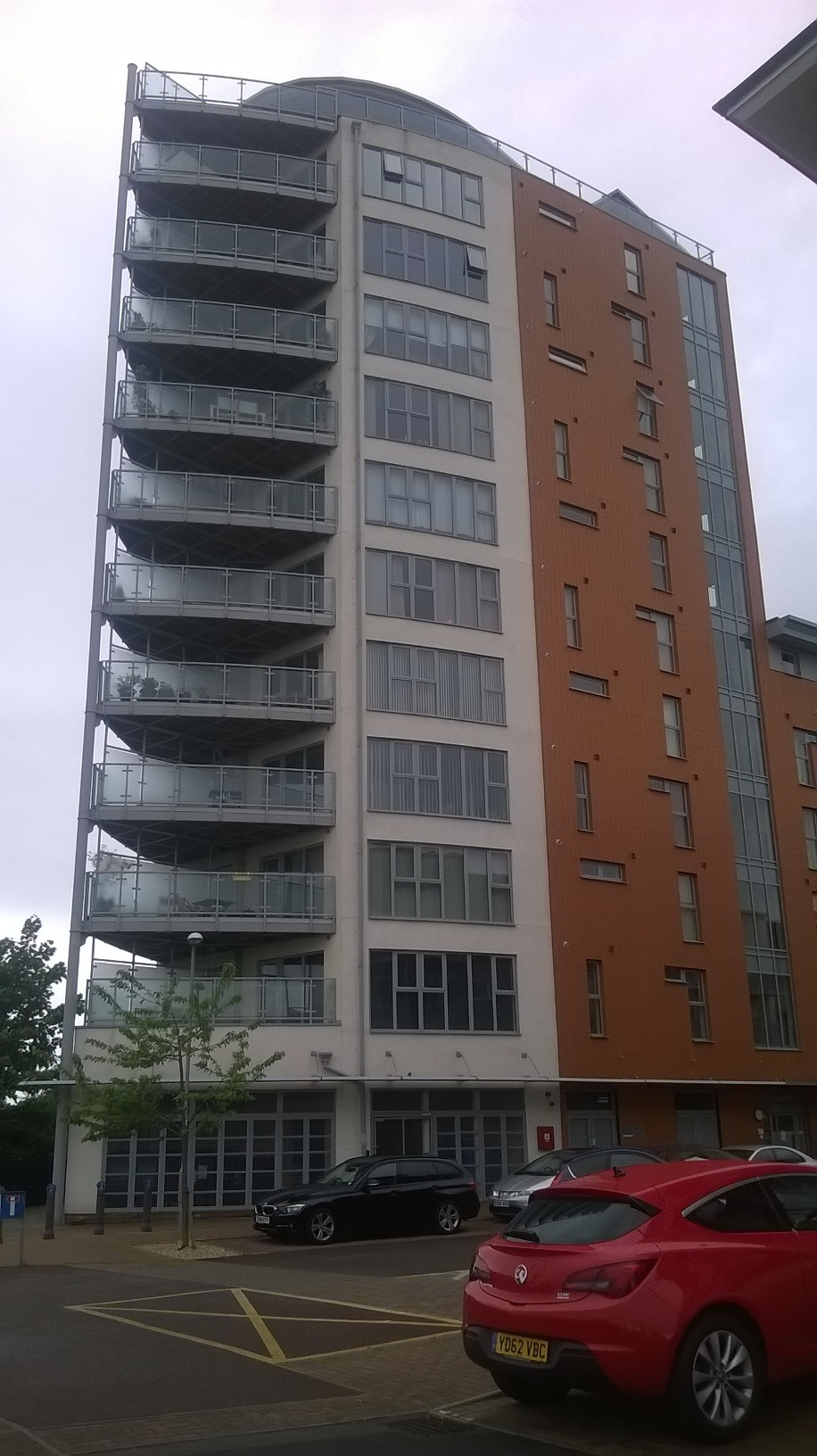
- Interactive map of the 10 Reavell Place area
- Alternative names: Voyage Block G

General information
- Status: Completed
- Type: Residential
- Location: 10 Reavell Place IP2 0ET, Ipswich, England
- Coordinates: 52.053657°N 1.139375°E
- Construction started: 2008
- Completed: May 2010
- Client: Fairview New Homes Ltd.
- Owner: Fairview New Homes Ltd.

Height
- Height: 37 m (121 ft)

Technical details
- Floor count: 12
- Lifts/elevators: 1

Design and construction
- Civil engineer: Allglass (Anglia) Limited
- Awards: EPC ENERGY RATING B

Other information
- Parking: Underground

10 Reavell Place is a 37 metres (121 ft), 12 storey residential building located on the River Gipping, Ipswich, Suffolk, England. The building consists of residential units with no commercial outlets. The building is one of the tallest buildings in Ipswich.

== Location ==
This is the tallest building in the development along Ranleigh Road, in the new 'Voyage' development. The development also includes the Sir Bobby Robson Bridge which connects the development to the Ipswich Village Development.

== History ==
10 Reavell Place sits on the old grounds of the former Compair Reavell site, hence its name. The Compair site occupied the site the 'Voyage' development sits on. The company moved out in 2005 to a new location on the outskirts of the town. Its alternate name is Voyage Block G as it is the seventh residential building in the development. The other buildings in development, Voyage Block's A-F are low rise residential buildings built in a similar modern style. Allglass (Anglia) Limited were awarded the contract for the installation of the windows as well as overseeing other design aspects by Fairview New Homes Ltd. The building achieved an EPC ENERGY RATING B.

== See also ==
- List of tallest buildings and structures in Ipswich
