= Old Shire Hall =

Old Shire Hall may refer to:

- Old Shire Hall, Bury St Edmunds, later replaced by the New Share Hall, Bury St Edmunds
- Old Shire Hall, Cambridge, late replaced by the New Shire Hall, Alconbury Weald
- Old Shire Hall, Durham
- Old Shire Hall, Reading, later replaced by the Shire Hall, Shinfield Park
- Old Shirehall, Shrewsbury, later replaced by the new Shirehall, Shrewsbury
