= New Shire Hall (disambiguation) =

The New Shire Hall may refer to:

- The New Shire Hall, Alconbury Weald, which replaced the Old Shire Hall, Cambridge
- The New Shire Hall, Bury St Edmunds, which replaced the Old Shire Hall, Bury St Edmunds
- The new Shire Hall, Shinfield Park, which replaced the Old Shire Hall, Reading
- The new Shirehall, Shrewsbury, which replaced the Old Shirehall, Shrewsbury
