= Andrea Hill =

Andrea Hill was Suffolk County Council's chief executive from March 2008 to July 2011, when she left the authority by mutual agreement.

== Early career ==
Hill attended The Sandon School, Sandon, Chelmsford, Essex and then studied public administration at Birmingham University and followed her father, an Essex County Council officer, into local government. Her first post was as a management trainee at Thurrock Council in the 1980s, followed by director of communications and policy development at North Hertfordshire. In the mid-1990s she was assistant chief executive at Cambridge City Council, and by 2001 she had gained her first chief officer post at Colchester District Council, aged 37, on a salary of £85,000. Among her achievements there was a £1.5 billion PFI contract for a new army garrison.

== County council CEO ==
In August 2004 Hill became chief executive of Bedfordshire County Council. During her three years tenure, it moved from two to three stars in the Audit Commission's ratings, and was described by them as one of twenty "strongly improving" authorities in the country.

== Suffolk county council ==
Hill was appointed chief executive of Suffolk County Council in March 2008 at the age of 44. She was a powerful and vocal advocate of the emerging "New Strategic Direction" of outsourcing council functions, which became an exemplar for ministers. However, as the cuts of 2010/11 began to loom ever closer, so the media interest in Hill increased, with headlines about her rather than the council. By April 2011 Andrea Hill wrote her side of the controversy in the council's house magazine: Inside SCC. But by then the council's new direction had become increasingly distrusted by elected members, who threw it out with the election of Mark Bee as the replacement council leader for Jeremy Pembroke.

That may have sealed Andrea Hill's fate. In July 2011 (aged 47) she received a year's salary as pay-off for relinquishing her post, following a "whistle-blowing" enquiry that exonerated her of any wrongdoing. In October 2011 she was replaced by Deborah Cadman OBE.

== Subsequently ==
Ms Hill subsequently took a sabbatical role as a yachting holiday flotilla hostess in the Virgin Islands.
