= Russell Road =

Russell Road may refer to:

- Russell Road (Ontario), Canada
- Russell Road (Las Vegas), Nevada, U.S.A.
- Russell Road (Ipswich), England, U.K.
- A north–south road in Fort Fairfield, Maine, U.S.A. near the Canada–United States border
