= St Lawrence Church, Ipswich =

Church in Ipswich, Suffolk, England

Coordinates: 52.057389°N 1.154801°E

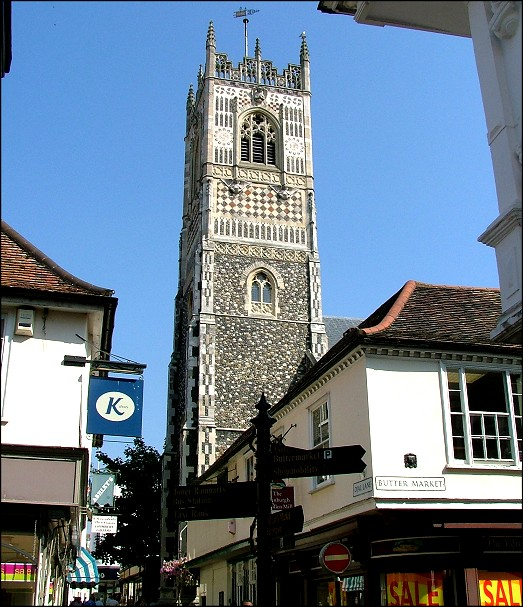
The tower of St Lawrence

St Lawrence Church is a Grade II* listed church in Ipswich, Suffolk, that is now used as a community centre. The 15th-century church has the oldest ring of five church bells in the world.

== History ==
St Lawrence was built on Dial Lane in the heart of present-day Ipswich. The upper section of the tower was rebuilt in 1882 by the London firm of Barnes and Gaye. The new Victorian design consists of floral and geometric flintwork patterns and includes the initials S. and L. Unusually, the modifications also removed the central aisle from the nave in an attempt to prevent celebration of the High Anglican liturgy. It served as a parish church until the early 1970s, when the parish was declared redundant by the diocese due to its having no members.

Care of the building was handed over to the Ipswich Historic Churches Trust and the church fell into disrepair. After deliberations over future usage and subsequent extensive renovations, the church was reopened as a community restaurant and gallery in July 2008. The £1.2 million cost of the restorations came from Ipswich Borough Council and UK government grants.

== Bells ==
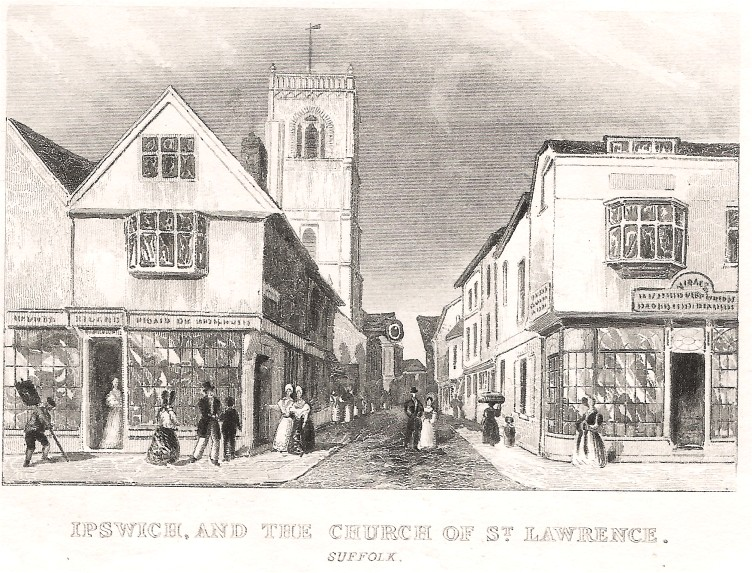
A view of the tower in 1846

The church's tower features the oldest ring of church bells remaining in the world. The five bells, hung in a modern steel frame for change ringing, are known as "Wolsey's bells", after Cardinal Wolsey who was raised in the area. It is believed that Wolsey's uncle Edmund Daundy may have commissioned one of the bells. Four of them were cast circa 1450 and a fifth added circa 1480. The bells remain undamaged and unmodified, and still include their original clappers. In 1985 the bells were removed when the tower was declared unsafe. After reconstruction of the tower and the installation of a new bell frame, the bells, having been overhauled by the Whitechapel Bell Foundry, were returned to working use in September 2009. According to the IHCT, the next oldest set of five are located in St Bartholomew the Great and date from 1500.

The bells are recognised as being historically important by the Church of England's Church Building Council.

== Curates ==
- (1808-1830) James Ford

== See also ==
- List of tallest buildings and structures in Ipswich
