= West Suffolk County Council =

County council in the United Kingdom (1889–1974)

History
- Founded: 1 April 1889
- Disbanded: 1 April 1974
- Succeeded by: Suffolk County Council

Meeting place
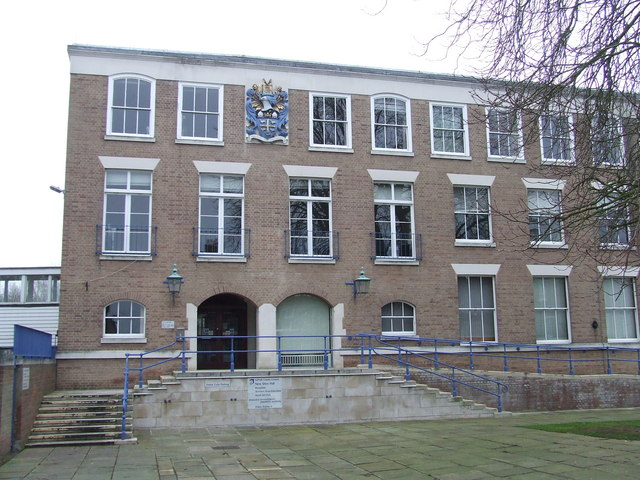
- New Shire Hall, Bury St Edmunds

West Suffolk County Council was the county council of the administrative county of West Suffolk in east England. It came into its powers on 1 April 1889 and acted as the governing authority for the county until it was amalgamated with East Suffolk County Council to form Suffolk County Council in 1974. The county council was based at the Shire Hall Complex in Bury St Edmunds.
