= Sir Bobby Robson Bridge =

Footbridge in Ipswich, England

Coordinates: 52.0529°N 1.1410°E

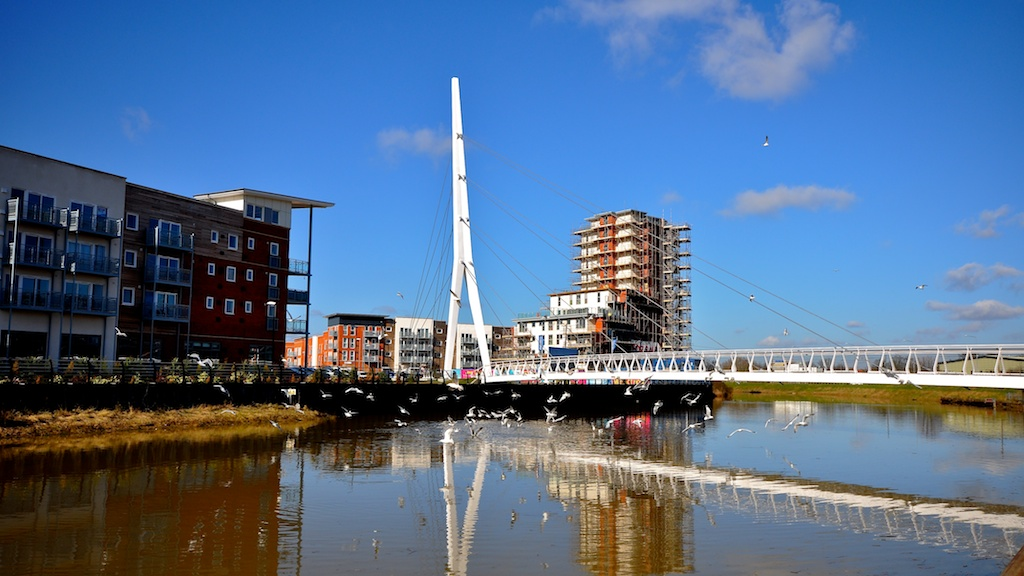
Sir Bobby Robson footbridge with the residential development on the left.

The Sir Bobby Robson Bridge is a 60-metre (200 ft) cable-stayed pedestrian footbridge over the River Gipping in Ipswich, England, built at a cost of £800,000. The height of the structure makes it the 2nd highest structure in Ipswich. The bridge was named after Sir Bobby Robson, the ex–Ipswich Town manager, Newcastle United manager and England national football team manager, who died in 2009. Funded by the property developer Fairview, the bridge was constructed in 2009 and designed by Train and Kemp. It connects a residential development with the town centre. Before the construction of the bridge, residents had to walk a considerably long way to the next river crossing.

== See also ==
- List of tallest buildings and structures in Ipswich
