= Ipswich Crown Court =

Judicial building in Ipswich, England

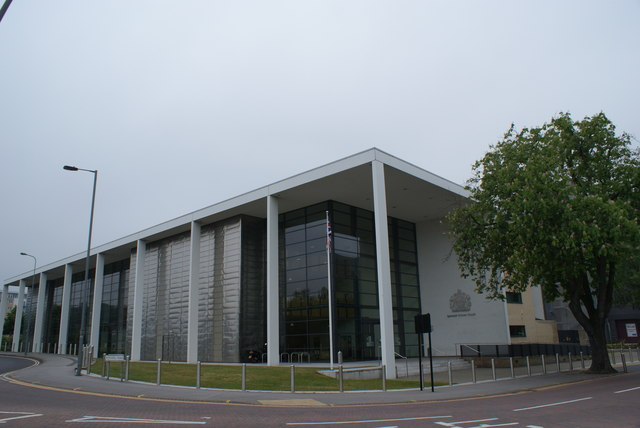
- Ipswich Crown Court

- Shown in Suffolk
- 52.0532°N 1.1442°E
- Location: Russell Road, Ipswich

History
- Built: 2004

Site notes
- Architect: Austin-Smith:Lord
- Architectural style: Modern style

Ipswich Crown Court is a Crown Court venue which deals with criminal cases at Russell Road, Ipswich, England. It was completed in 2004.

== History ==
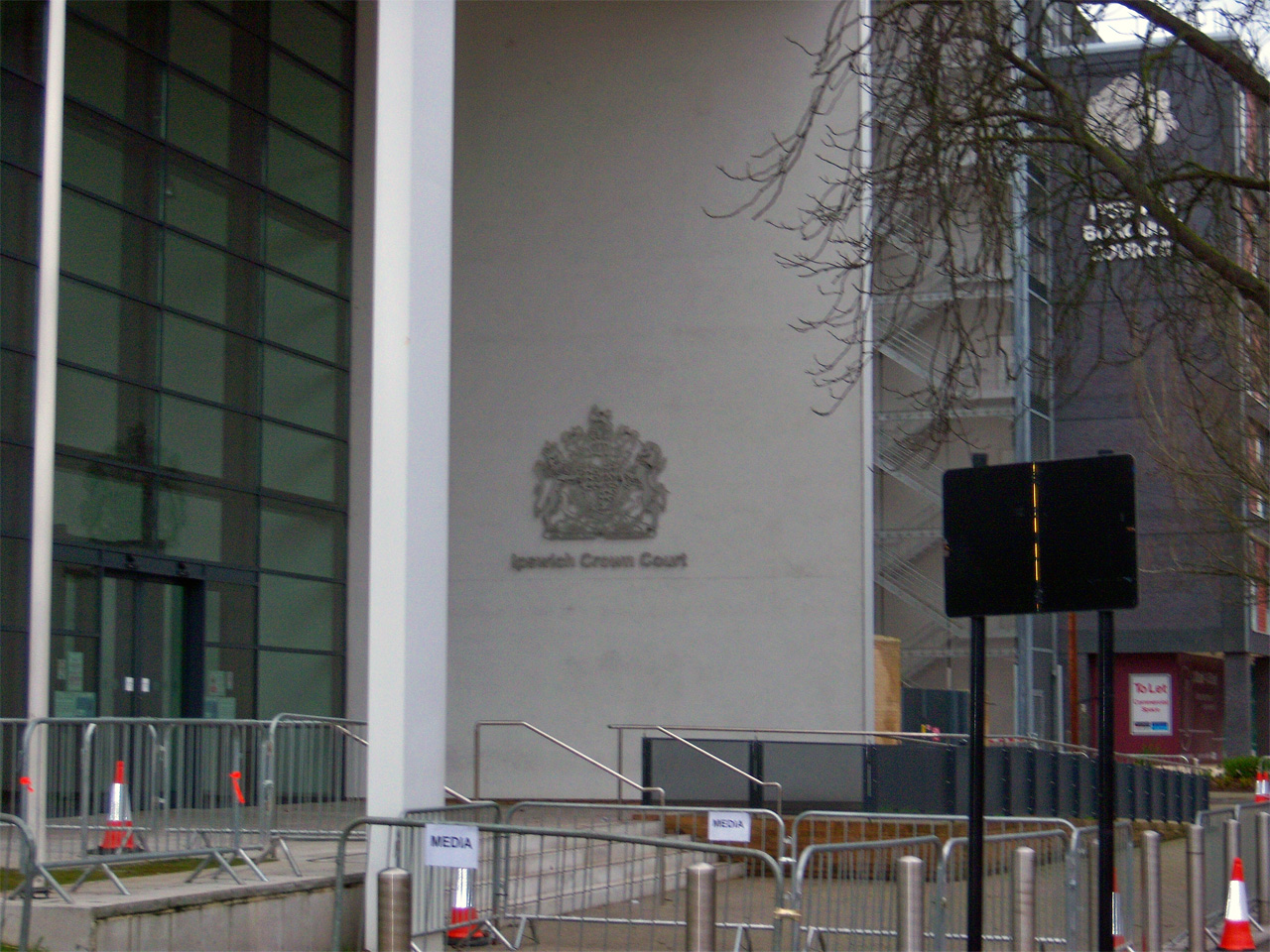
Main entrance to the court

Until the early 21st century, crown court hearings were held in the Civic Centre complex in Civic Drive, which was completed in the 1960s. After the judicial facilities in the Civic Centre were deemed to be inadequate, the Lord Chancellor's Department decided to commission a new courthouse: the site chosen formed part of the Ipswich Village Development.

The new building was procured under a Private finance initiative contract in 2001. It was designed by Austin-Smith:Lord in the modern style, built by Mowlem and was officially opened by Lord Falconer on 15 October 2004. The design involved a long glazed wall, which enclosed the main hall and entrance, and a stainless steel roof which was cantilevered forward on gable walls supported by narrow columns. The gable walls, the columns and the full-height recessed wall on the extreme right, which displayed a Royal coat of arms, were all constructed from white Suffolk bricks. Internally, the building was laid out to accommodate five courtrooms.

Notable cases heard at the court have included the trial and conviction of Steve Wright, in 2008, for the murder of five sex workers, the trial and conviction of Paul Clarke and Lorraine Thorpe, in 2010, (Note: Upon being convicted, Thorpe officially became Britain's youngest female double murderer, being only 15 at the time of the attacks, a fact that was widely reported in the media.) for the murder of Rosalyn Hunt and Desmond Thorpe, and the trial and conviction of Stephen Anthony Searle, in 2018, for the murder of his wife, Anne Seale.
