= East Suffolk County Council =

County council in the United Kingdom (1889–1974)

- Coat of arms

History
- Founded: 1 April 1889
- Disbanded: 1 April 1974
- Succeeded by: Suffolk County Council

Meeting place
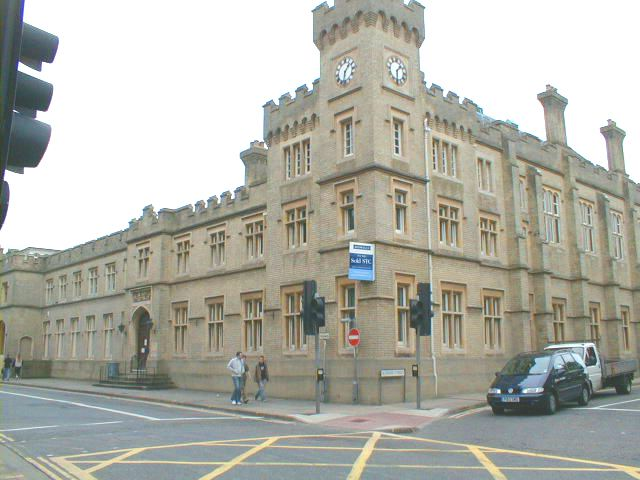
- East Suffolk County Hall, Ipswich

East Suffolk County Council was the county council of the administrative county of East Suffolk in east England. It came into its powers on 1 April 1889 and acted as the governing authority for the county until it was amalgamated with West Suffolk County Council to form Suffolk County Council in 1974. The county council was based at East Suffolk County Hall in Ipswich.
