= Ipswich Waterfront =

Area of Ipswich, Suffolk, England

Coordinates: 52.050°N 1.161°E

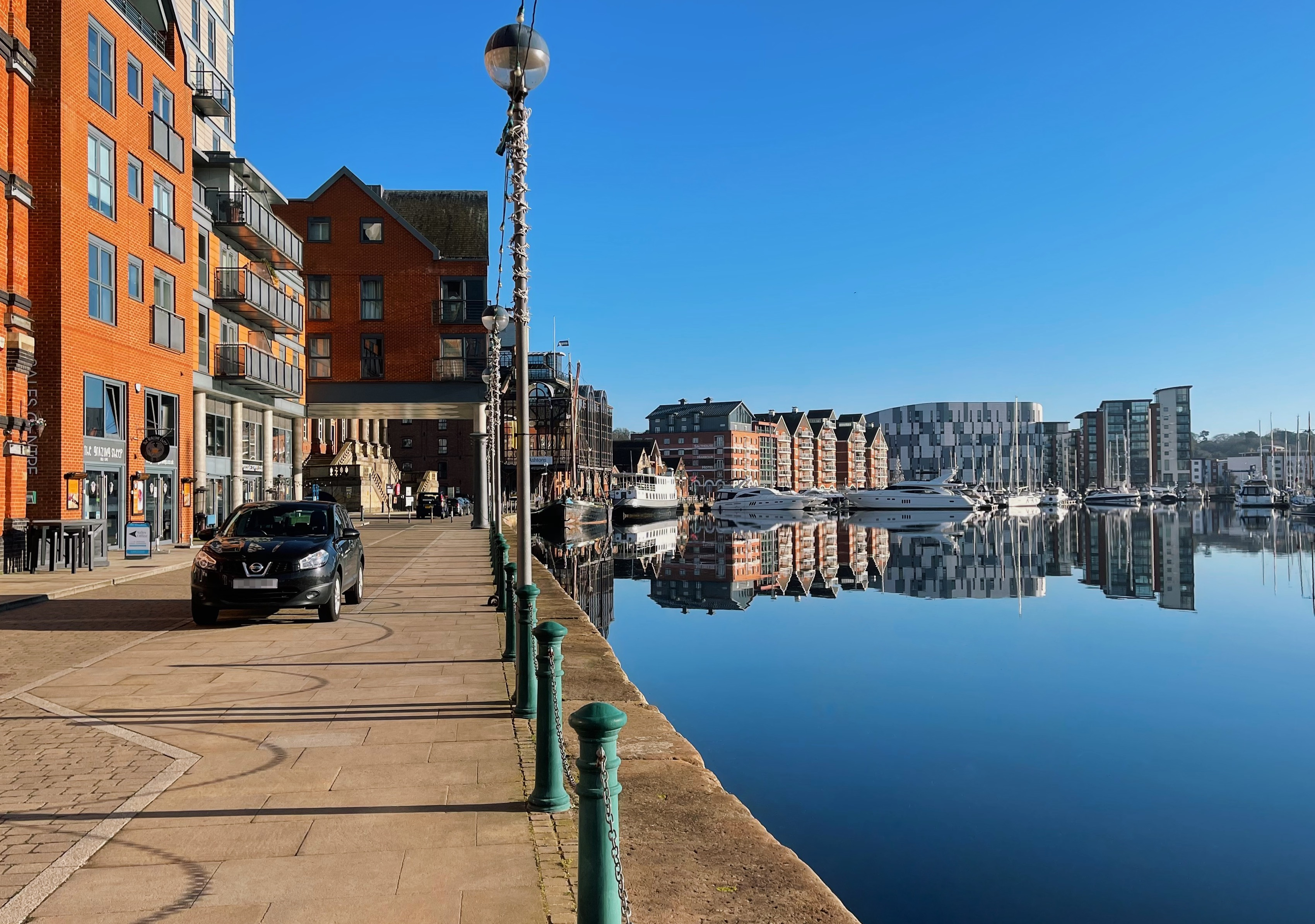
- Sunny day on the Ipswich Waterfront
- Interactive map of Ipswich Waterfront
- Former name: Ipswich Wet Dock
- Location: Ipswich, Suffolk, England

Construction
- Completed: 1842

Other
- Website: www.neptune-marina.com www.ipswich-waterfront.co.uk

The Ipswich Waterfront is a cultural and historically significant area surrounding the marina in the town of Ipswich, Suffolk, England. The modern dock was constructed in 1842 and the area was a functioning dock up until the 1970s. At the time of completion, the dock was known as 'the biggest and most important enclosed dock in the kingdom'. Although the dock as it stands was constructed in 1842, the area was used for trade as far back as the 7th century. The decline of industry in the town resulted in the area being transformed into a trendy area of Ipswich, the waterfront is now characterised by its marina, known as Neptune Marina, as well as its mix of classical and postmodern architecture which includes multiple high-rise apartment buildings, restaurants, bars and cafés. The waterfront is also home to the main campus of the region's university, the University of Suffolk.

== Early period ==
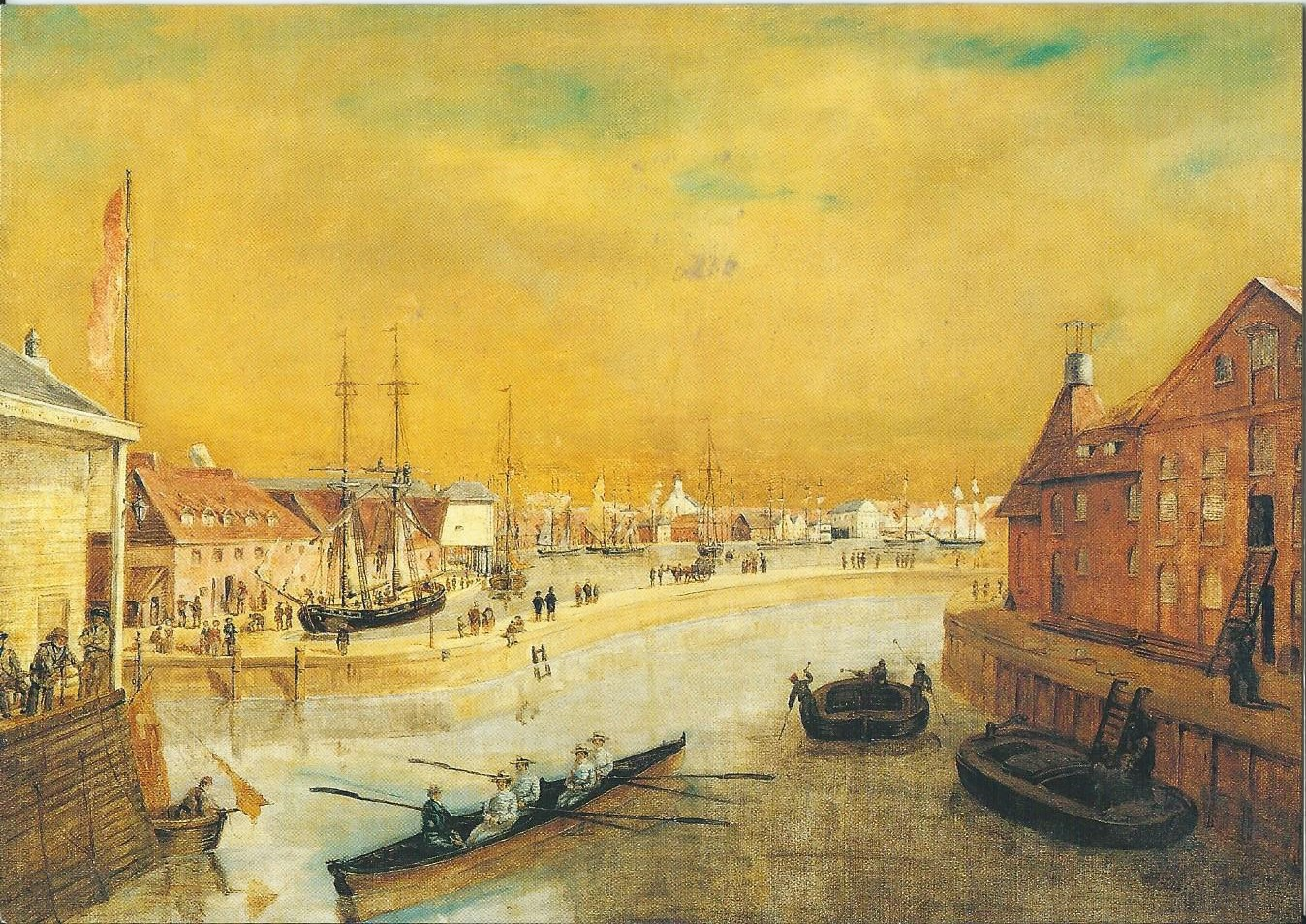
The Wet Dock, Ipswich oil painting by Claude Lorraine Nursey c. 1842

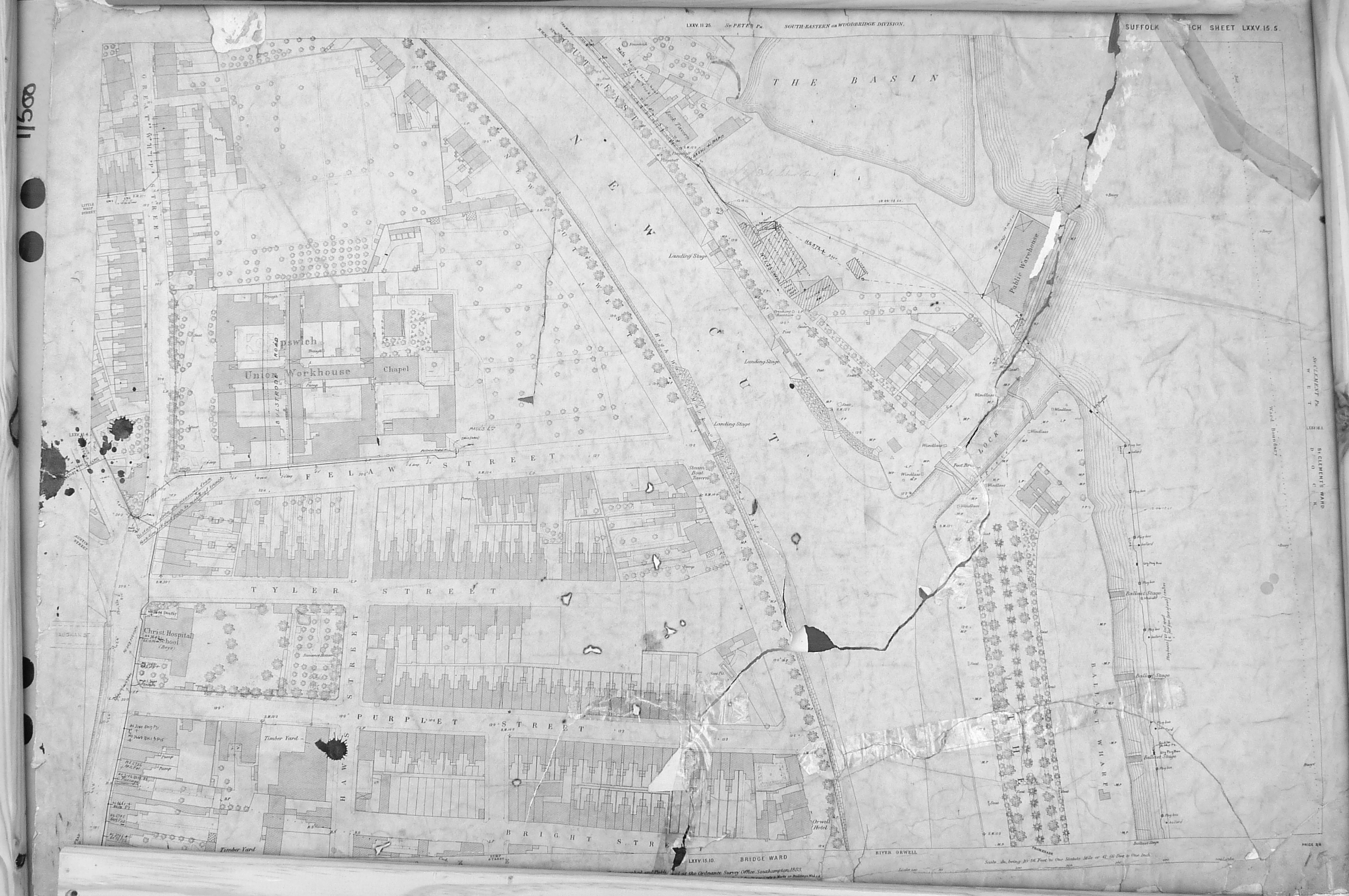
Map showing the original lock gates 1884

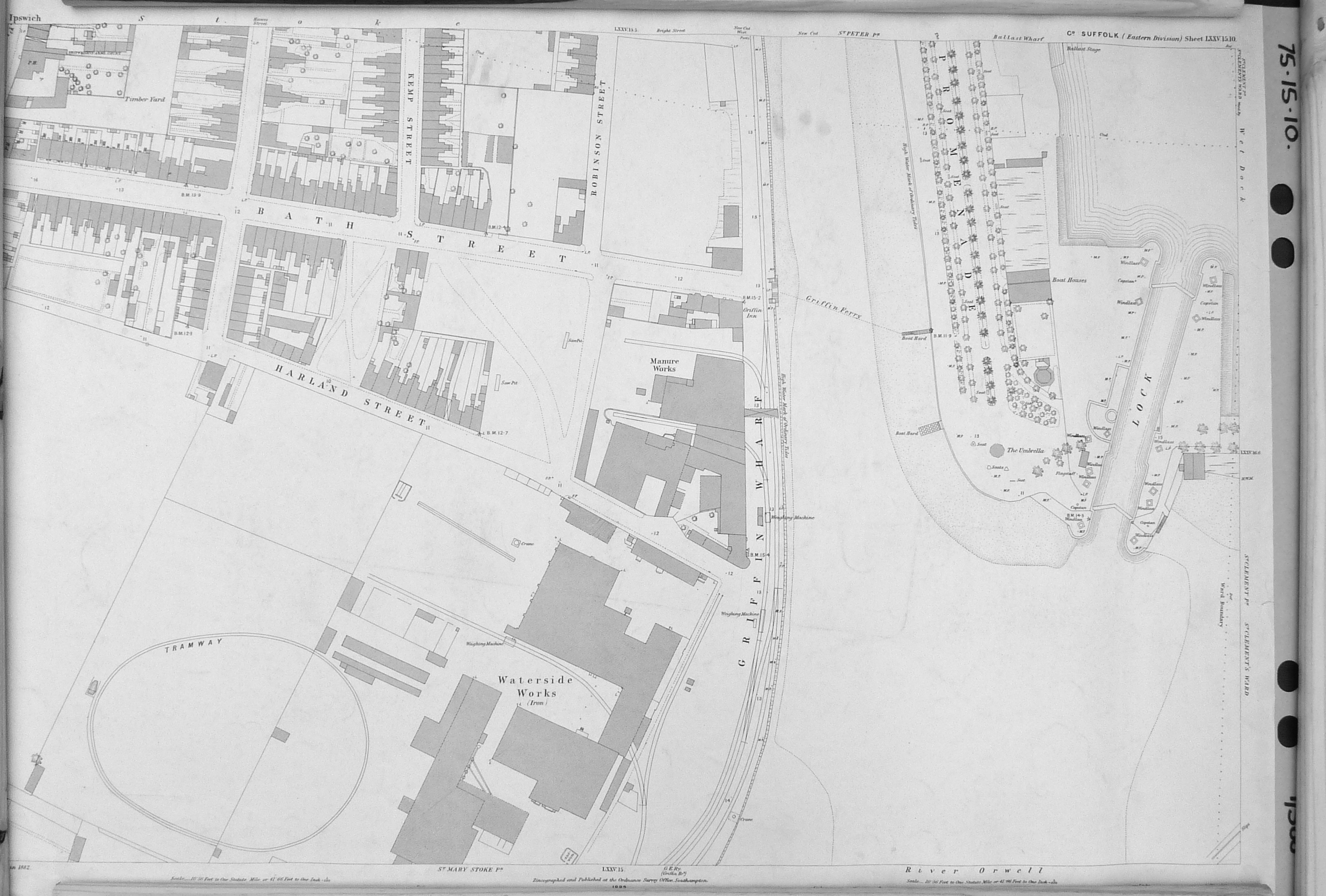
Map showing the New Cut, the lock gates, the promenade and the griffin ferry - 1884

A dock was in operation in Ipswich on a bend in the River Orwell in the 8th century, and was probably established during the 7th century under the protection of the ruling house of the Kingdom of East Anglia, which reached its summit under King Raedwald. The importance of this dock, and the surrounding town which served it, has been recognised through excavation over the past fifty years. The early town of Ipswich (then called Gipeswic), centred upon the quay, extended over more than 52 hectares, the area later enclosed by the Viking Age ramparts (which curtailed the Anglo-Saxon township), making it one of the largest new early post-Roman townships and emporia in northern Europe. Imported pottery of Rhenish Merovingian types, imported lava quern-stones and barrel-timbers dendro-dated to 8th century Germany, and finds of continental coinage such as 'porcupine sceattas' indicate trade through the Rhine port towns including Domburg, Dorestad and Andernach, as part of the cultural engagement of Anglo-Saxon England with the Frisian, Frankish, Alamannic, Saxon, Thuringian and Burgundian worlds. The important 'Ipswich ware' pottery industry, established in the town's north-east quarter probably in the late 7th century, reflected shapes and kiln technologies based on Frisian prototypes, either in imitation of imports arriving at the quay or set up by migrant Frisian workers. The Gipeswic dock was therefore the trade capital of the East Anglian Kingdom, situated not far from its royal centre at Rendlesham and Sutton Hoo. During the 7th and 8th centuries the two greatest English ports were York (Eoforwic) and London, and two principal new ports were Gipeswic in the east and Hamwic (Southampton) in the south. Like Hamwih, Gipeswic dock was therefore a point of departure and arrival for continental travel.

The early waterfront of Ipswich Dock ran from approximately St Peter's Church, near the present Stoke Bridge, eastward behind the present quay or marina embankment and past the present Custom House. It lay originally nearer to the line of College Street and Salthouse Street, with new revetments being built successively further out into the river in order to achieve a sufficient depth of water for ships to moor, as the earlier embankments became silted. The area between the road and the quay, formerly occupied by warehouses and now by new building developments, represents this area of successive embankments built upon river-mud. An extensive area of early Medieval waterfront construction was found by excavation during recent works to demolish the old industrial waterfront, and showed the footings of many projecting boardwalks, in a similar way to the contemporary waterfront at Dorestad, one of its principal trading partners in those times.

The original crossing was a ford, east of Stoke Bridge, linking Great Whip Street (on the south bank) with Foundation Street to the north, which then immediately branched into Lower Brook Street. The area north of the road, between St Peter's church and St Mary-at-Quay (and east of that), is thought to represent the site of the Anglo-Saxon industrial waterfront development. Its first urban catchment area extended north up to Falcon Street, Old Cattle Market, Dog's Head Street and Tacket Street, with burial grounds on rising land to the north. Probably during the 8th century the Stoke Bridge crossing was created, establishing the importance of St Peter's Street as the main northern route, and urban expansion spread over the burial grounds north to include the street called Buttermarket, the Cornhill area, and the line of the prehistoric road now represented by Westgate Street, Tavern Street and Carr Street. Discoveries of early sceattas in this area, and a dedication to St Mildred, suggest that this new layout was planned during the reigns of Kings Ealdwulf (664-713) and his son AElfwald (713-749). The street plan represented by this early Medieval development still largely survives in use in the modern town of Ipswich, and is one of the oldest post-Roman street-plans to survive anywhere in Europe. Both dock and town have remained in continuous use and occupation since that time.

In 991 a fleet of 93 Viking ships swept up the river Orwell and sacked the town.

During Edward III's reign Ipswich was one of the richest and most important ports in the country. Wool from Norfolk and Suffolk was in great demand by the weavers of Flanders and the Netherlands. 300 ships massed in the river to carry soldiers to fight and win the battle of Cressy. In 1588 Ipswich built, fitted out and manned two ships to sail against the Spanish Armada.

== 1700-1950 ==
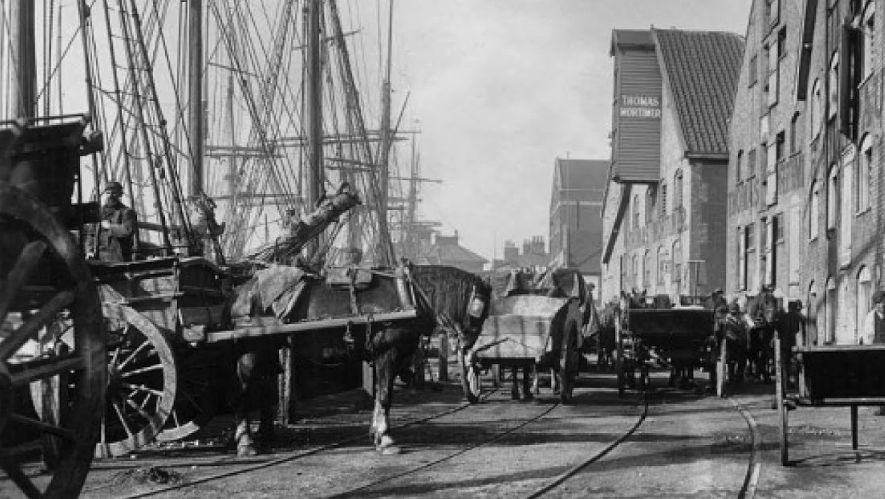
Neptune Quay c. 1890

John Kirby reported in 1732 that the trade in the town had recently reduced and that there had been 20 ships a year built in the town, having seen over 200 ships belonging to the town in the port during the winter.

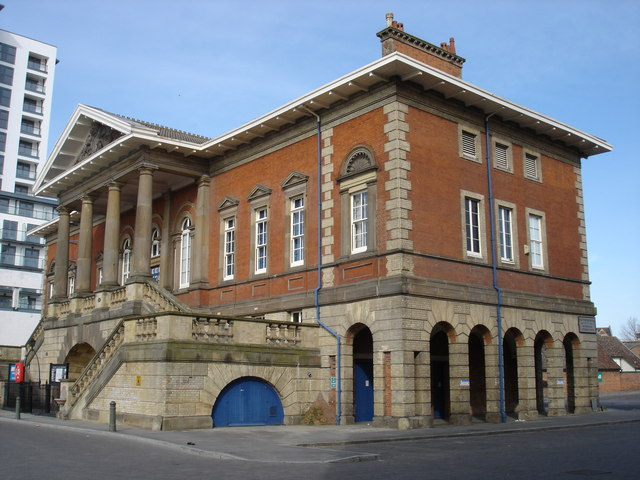
The Old Customs House on the waterfront

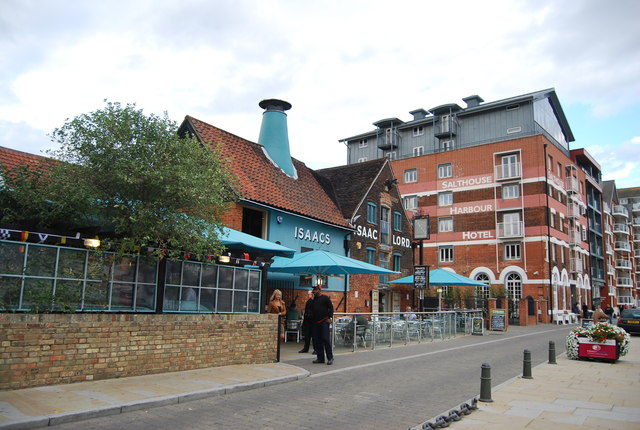
Isaacs on the Quay, a former malt kiln transformed into the largest pub in Ipswich. Adjacent to Isaacs is the Salthouse Harbour Hotel.

The dock was 'improved' in 1805, and in 1837 an Act of Parliament allowed the Ipswich Dock Commissioners to construct a new wet dock whilst also placing certain conditions on them. Edward Caley was chief engineer, at the age of 20. In addition to building the wet dock and providing a diversion for the river Orwell along a 'New Cut' to the west of the dock the commissioners were to allow all persons, with cattle and carriages, may thereby have free access to the dock and quays and the sides of the said new cut and channel and also to contribute to the health and recreation of the inhabitants [of Ipswich]. The Ipswich Dock Commission was provided with investment of £25,000 and the right to borrow a further £100,000 but needed a further loan of £20,000 and also an additional levy of six pence per tonne on all imported coal to fund the project. The dock opened in 1842; the original lock gates entered the dock from the New Cut opposite Felaw Street. The new custom house (now known as the 'Old Custom House') was completed in 1845.

The Ipswich Docks Act 1877 (40 & 41 Vict. c. ccxvi) allowed for the construction of a new lock in their present position to facilitate access to the dock and allow trams to operate along the length of the 'Island' between New Cut and the dock. The new lock gates were constructed by the time of the 1898 Act which authorised the construction of a swing bridge.

The Ipswich Docks Act 1913 (3 & 4 Geo. 5. c. cvi) allowed for the construction of 'a new entrance to the docks comprising inner and outer gates and a swing bridge, a quay and various tramways' and also allowed for the 'stopping off' of various rights of way. There was however a condition that work had to be completed within 10 years and following World War I an extension was granted by an Act of Parliament in 1918.

== 1950-present day ==
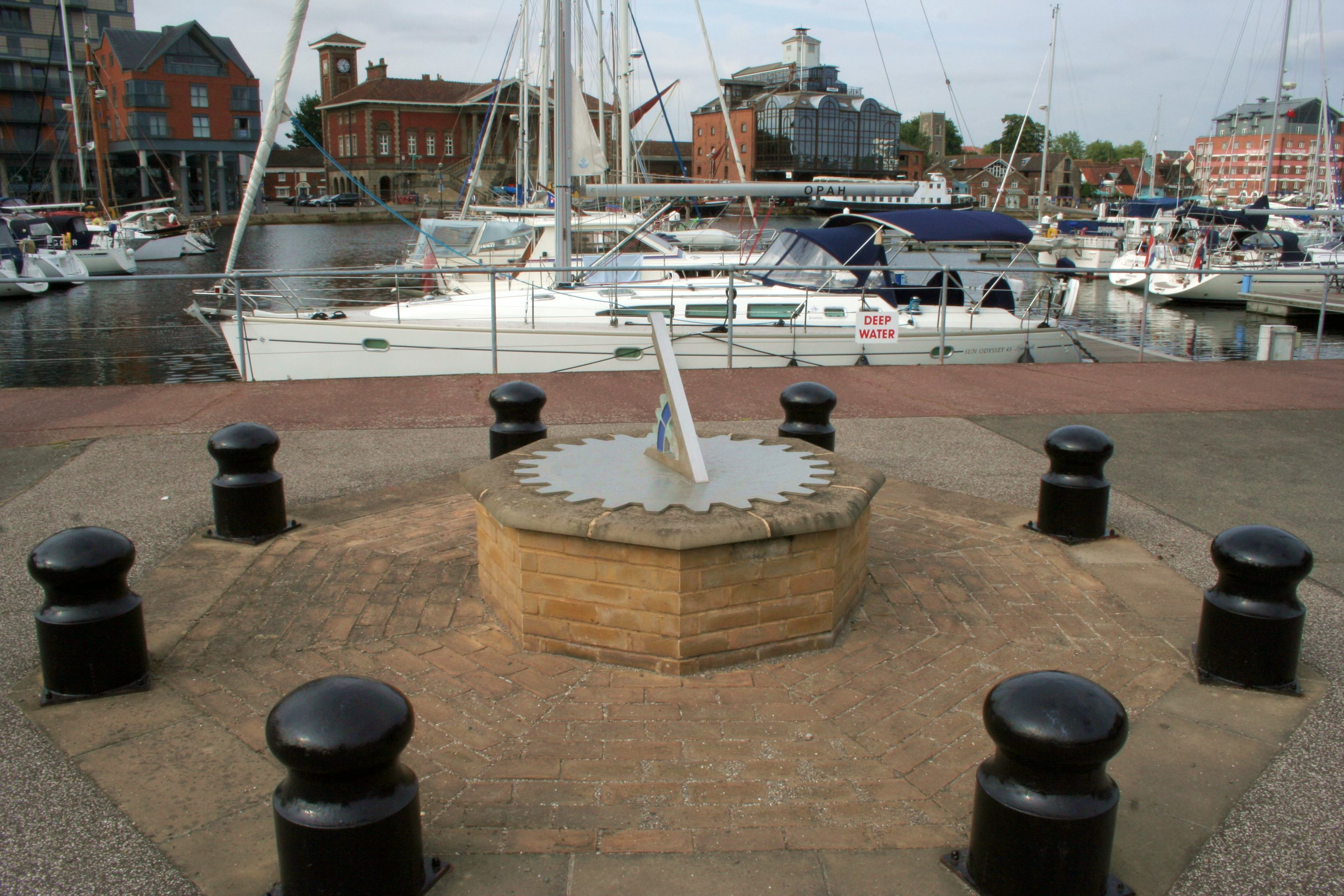
Sundial at Ipswich Haven Marina

The Ipswich Dock Act 1971 (c. xiv) authorised the development of the West Bank to allow ro-ro ships to dock. The Ipswich Dock Commission was reconstituted as the Ipswich Port Authority in 1973 when the first stage of the development was completed, further work was carried out in 1977 and 1979 and then again in 1998.

In 1997 the port was sold by Ipswich Ports Ltd to Associated British Ports. In 1998 new facilities were constructed for handling grain and timber followed by a Timber Treatment Centre in 1999. A new 7,500 square metre bulk storage shed with equipment for bagging and blending of fertilizers and other bulk products was then developed in the site of Cliff Quay Power Station. In 2000 there were a number of further developments; a £1.9million agribulk storage facility opened; new automated lock gates were completed; a 180 berth Ipswich Haven Marina opened and the Old Custom House was refurbished and restored with the former bonded warehouse on the ground floor converted into the 'Waterfront Conference Centre'. In 2009 Tarmac Ltd invested around £8 million into a new development on the Powerstation Quay, the new site incorporated a state of the art asphalt plant and concrete plant. The new site imports a significant amount of aggregate from Northern Ireland and Europe and operates 24/7.

=== The Waterfront ===
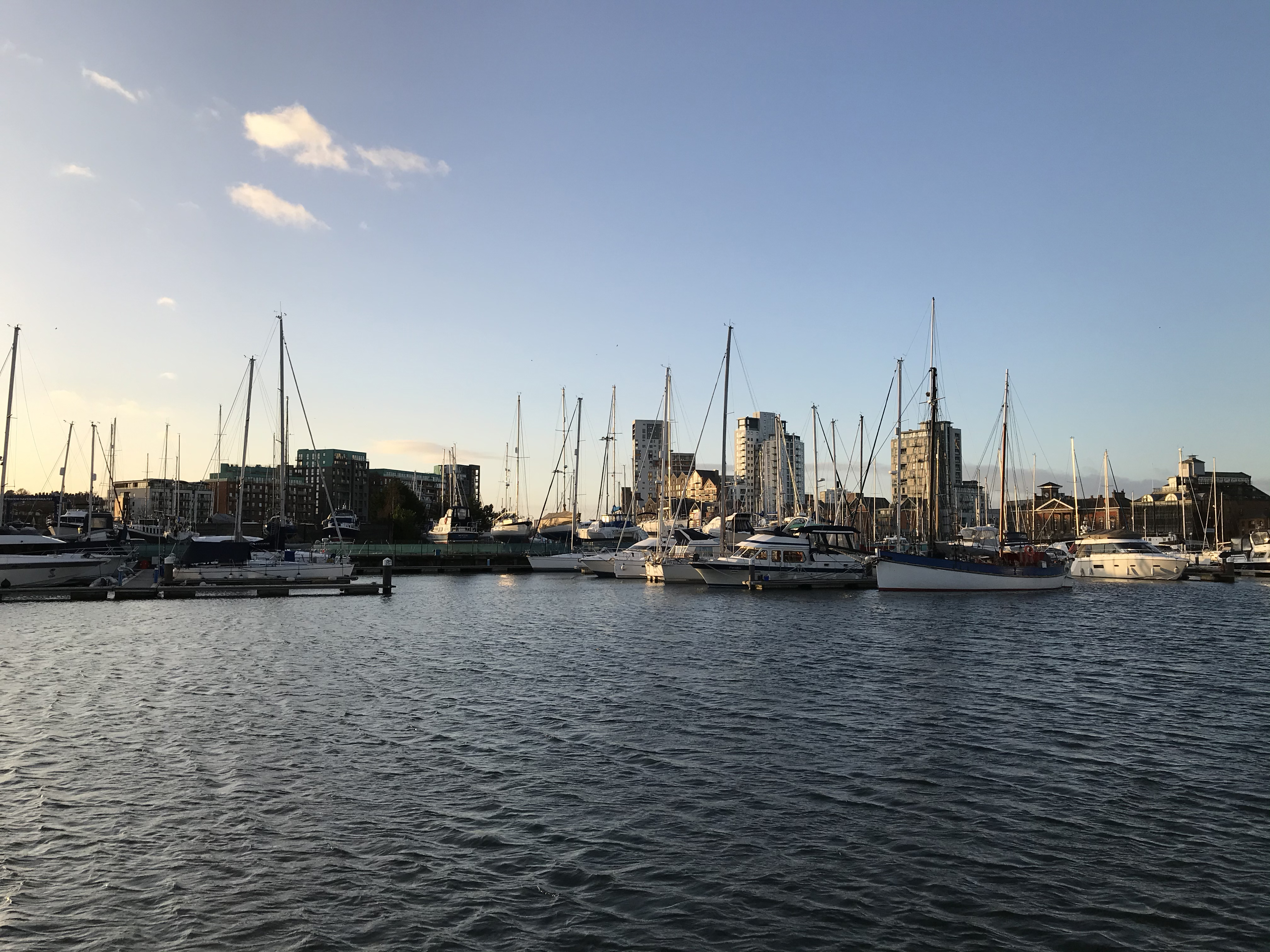
Facing west on the Ipswich Waterfront

The Waterfront in Ipswich is now provides leisure facilities with many new buildings having been constructed along the northern and eastern quays since 1995. The Salthouse Harbour Hotel, opened in 2003 and was extended in 2009. The University of Suffolk opened on the waterfront in 2008 with further construction in progress in 2010. The Mill, a 23-story mixed-use high rise that currently holds the record as Suffolk's tallest building, was topped out in late 2008 by the town's member of parliament, Chris Mole. In 2009, Dance East opened their new £8.9m Jerwood DanceHouse within the building.

National Cycle Route 1 and National Cycle Route 51 pass along the waterfront. Ipswich Waterfront Action (previously known as the Ipswich Waterfront Community Group) has been working for a friendly, thriving and vibrant community on the Ipswich Waterfront since 2007.

=== The Port of Ipswich ===
The dock is owned by Associated British Ports who operate both the 'West Bank' terminal (to the west of the New Cut) and 'Cliff Quay' (to the east of the Orwell). West Bank has two transit sheds totaling 6,377 sq m, plus areas available for open storage and operates a ro-ro service. Cliff Quay handles and stores liquid and dry bulks and has 67,583 sq m of covered storage and additional open storage. There is a daily freight ferry service linking Ipswich with the Port of Rotterdam. The container terminal is equipped to handle all types of containers and can also accept out-of-gauge and heavy lift cargoes and is equipped to accommodate short to mid-sea operations.

There is also the Ipswich Haven Marina with mooring for 250 private boats, a chandler and two boatbuilders (Fairline Yachts and Spirit Yachts).

Welfare and practical services for seafarers arriving at the port are available via the services of a port chaplain.

=== Duke Street Junction Improvements ===
Work has been completed following Suffolk County Council's proposed plans to reduce congestion in the Duke Street-Fore Hamlet area, this was achieved through work on the junctions and rights of way along the route. The scheme was funded through the Community Infrastructure Fund, as it improves connections to and from the redeveloped waterfront area.

The scheme included replacing the Duke Street roundabout with a signalled junction with changes to the access onto/off of Back Hamlet and Duke Street, the changes to access resulted in no entry from Back Hamlet to Fore Street and Fore Hamlet meaning that traffic flows more smoothly as there are no interruptions in flow caused by vehicles entering from Back Hamlet; the other change to access is from Duke Street which now has no right turns from Duke Street onto Fore Hamlet. The pedestrian crossing facilities in the area have also been modernised including implementing bus priority measures. Cycle lanes have been added, and the pavement widened along Fore Hamlet, with a bus lane being added to Fore Hamlet.

=== Ipswich Waterfront Action ===
The Waterfront Action (previously known as the Ipswich Waterfront Community Group) was established in 2007 as a community initiative with the purpose of working towards a friendly, thriving and vibrant community on the Ipswich Waterfront. The organisation was set up by the Ipswich Waterfront Churches. A constitution has been drawn up so that funding can be sought to push the work forward.

Waterfront Action has organised several successful events which were held to help develop a relational and vibrant Ipswich Waterfront Community for both residents and visitors.

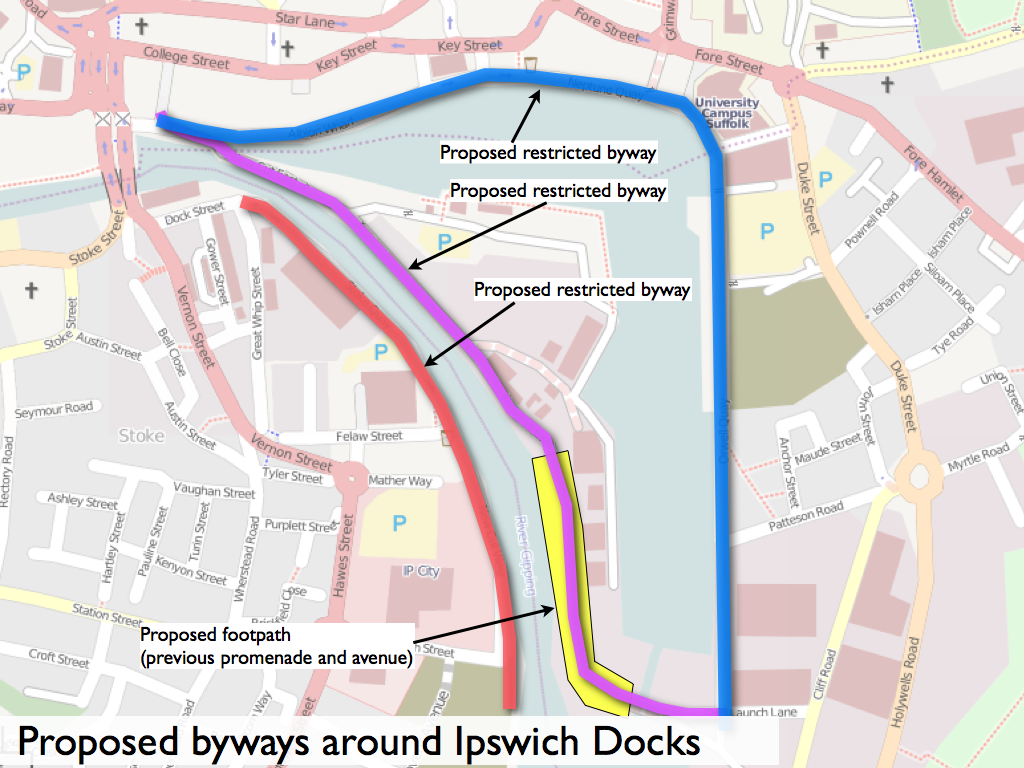
Proposed restricted byways

=== Restricted Byways ===
Suffolk County Council have created legal orders to create a number of restricted byways around the waterfront.

=== Ipswich Tidal Barrier ===
The area around the quays was flooded in 2013 during a tidal surge. In February 2019 a flood gate which protects the 'New Cut' was unveiled. The flood barrier, similar in design to the Thames Barrier, cost £67m.

== Historical plans ==
- Dock plans
  - Proposed Improvement of the River Orwell 1804 (ref. 150/8/6.9-IRO)
  - Plan of the Proposed Wet Dock 1836 (ref:150/8/6.9-IRO and HC/CL/PB/6/plan1837/78-HOL)
  - Plan of Wet Dock 1843 (ref. 150/8/6.9-IRO)
  - Ipswich Dock Plan 1875 (ref. 150/8/6.10-IRO)
  - Dock Plans 1877 (ref 150/8/6.12-IRO and HL/PO/CB/3/plan1877/I3-HOL)
  - Dock Plans 1898 (ref. 150/8/6.14-IRO)
  - Dock Plans 1904 (ref. 150/8/6.15-IRO)
  - Dock Plans 1913 (ref 150/8/6.16 – IRO)
  - Dock Plans 1918 (ref. 150/8/6.17-IRO)
- Railway plans
  - Eastern Union Railway from Colchester to Ipswich 1843 (ref. 150/2/5.59-IRO)
  - Proposed Railway from Colchester to Ipswich 1843 (ref. 150/2/5.240-IRO) (rival plans which were not constructed)
  - Great Eastern Railway 1876 (ref. 150/2/5.228-IRO)
  - Great Eastern Railway 1898 (ref. 150/2/5.214-IRO)
  - Great Eastern Railway 1901 (ref. 150/2/5.218-IRO)
  - Great Eastern Railway 1913 (ref. 150/2/51229-IRO)

== Legislation ==
- Ipswich Dock Act 1837
- Ipswich Dock Act 1852
- Ipswich Dock Act 1877
- Ipswich Dock Act 1898
- Ipswich Dock Act 1913
- Ipswich Dock Act 1918
- The Ipswich Dock Revision Order 1969 (Statutory Instrument 1969/1521)
- Ipswich Dock Act 1971
- Ipswich Port Authority Act 1979
- Ipswich Port Authority Act 1986
- The Port of Ipswich (Transfer of Undertaking) Harbour Revision Order 2002

== See also ==
- List of tallest buildings and structures in Ipswich
