= Endeavour House =

County building in Ipswich, Suffolk, England

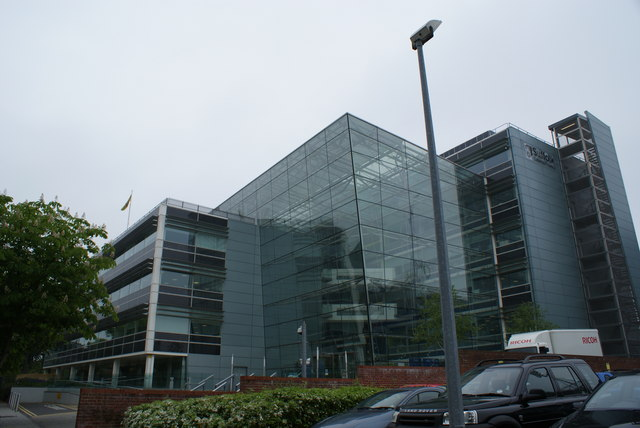
- Endeavour House

- Location within Suffolk
- Alternative names: Suffolk County Council Headquarters

General information
- Status: Completed
- Type: Office/Government
- Architectural style: Contemporary modern/High-tech architecture
- Location: 8 Russell Road, Ipswich, IP1 2BX, Ipswich, England
- Coordinates: 52.054045°N 1.143447°E
- Current tenants: Suffolk County Council and Concertus Design and Property Consultants
- Construction started: 2001
- Completed: 2003
- Opened: 2003
- Cost: £28 million
- Client: Suffolk County Council
- Owner: Suffolk County Council

Technical details
- Floor count: 5
- Floor area: 11,000 m^{2}
- Lifts/elevators: 5

Design and construction
- Architecture firm: TTSP Architects
- Other designers: M&S contractors
- Main contractor: Bovis Lend Lease
- Awards: Distinction/Ipswich society award, Commendation/Civic Trust award

Other information
- Parking: Underground

Website
- http://www.suffolk.gov.uk/

Endeavour House is a municipal building in Russell Road in Ipswich, Suffolk, England. It is the meeting place and offices of Suffolk County Council. The Babergh District Council and Mid Suffolk District Council also use the building for their offices and meeting place.

== History ==
The site was previously occupied by Russell House, which was once an Eastern Electricity Central Accounting Office but was demolished in 2001 to make way for the first stage of the Ipswich Village Development.

Endeavour House was designed by TTSP architects and constructed by Bovis Lend Lease at a cost of £28 million between 2001 and 2003. It was originally commissioned by TXU Corporation but, in November 2002, four months before the building was due to complete TXU Corporation went into administration. In 2003 Suffolk County Council, who had previously occupied the aging County Hall in Ipswich, were able to buy the 60% completed building for only £16 million. The county council made some alterations, the main change being the conversion of an indoor garden into a 90 desk chamber for 125 councilors on the second floor. However, in September 2016, 40% of the facilities were not being used.

In late 2017 Babergh and Mid Suffolk District Councils relocated to Endeavour House to lower their costs. East and West Suffolk Clinical Commissioning Groups also moved into Endeavour house in October 2017.

== Description ==
The building has 50,000 photovoltaic cells incorporated into the glass curtain walls, this being the largest installation of any office building in Europe. At peak sunlight these cells provide 57% of the building's energy demand and also create a dark pattern on the glass. There are also rain collecting reservoirs underground which recycle the water and pump it around the building for use in toilets. The building is designed to suit corporate businesses with glass curtain walls, cantilever walkways and offices with windows that look into the concourse, forming a major improvement on the working environment at the county council's former headquarters at the East Suffolk County Hall.

The building is situated at 8 Russell Road, opposite Ipswich Borough Council's headquarters at Grafton House. Portman Road Stadium is situated behind the building. There is some limited surface car parking for permit holders but there is also a large multistorey car park shared with Ipswich Borough Council with access from Constantine Road.

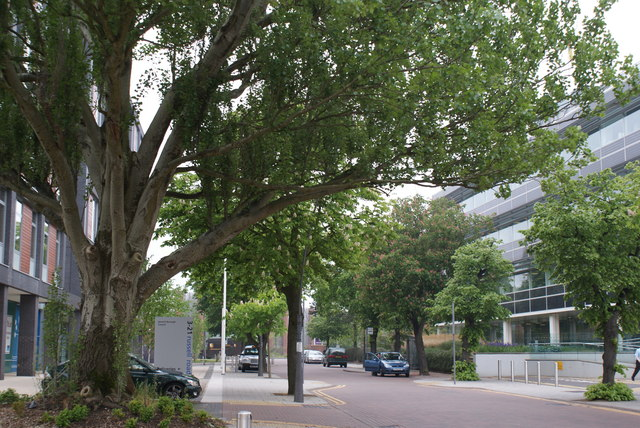
Russell Road with Endeavour house pictured on the right

Suffolk County Council coat of arms

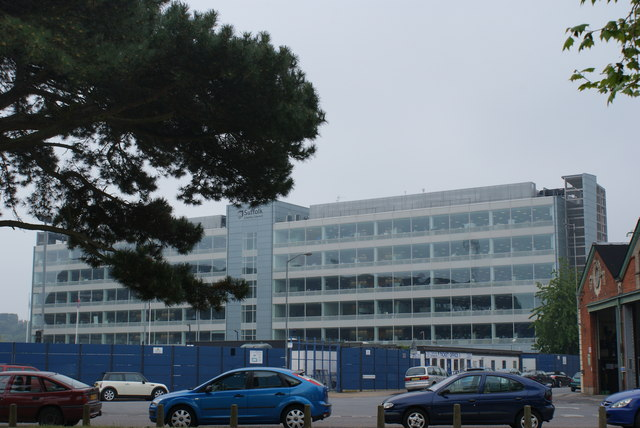
Endeavour House as seen from Constantine Road showing the rear of the building
