= West Suffolk House =

Coordinates: 52.2515°N 0.6970°E

West Suffolk House is a municipal building in Bury St Edmunds. It houses the base for West Suffolk Council It also houses offices for Suffolk County Council.
