= List of tallest buildings and structures in Ipswich =

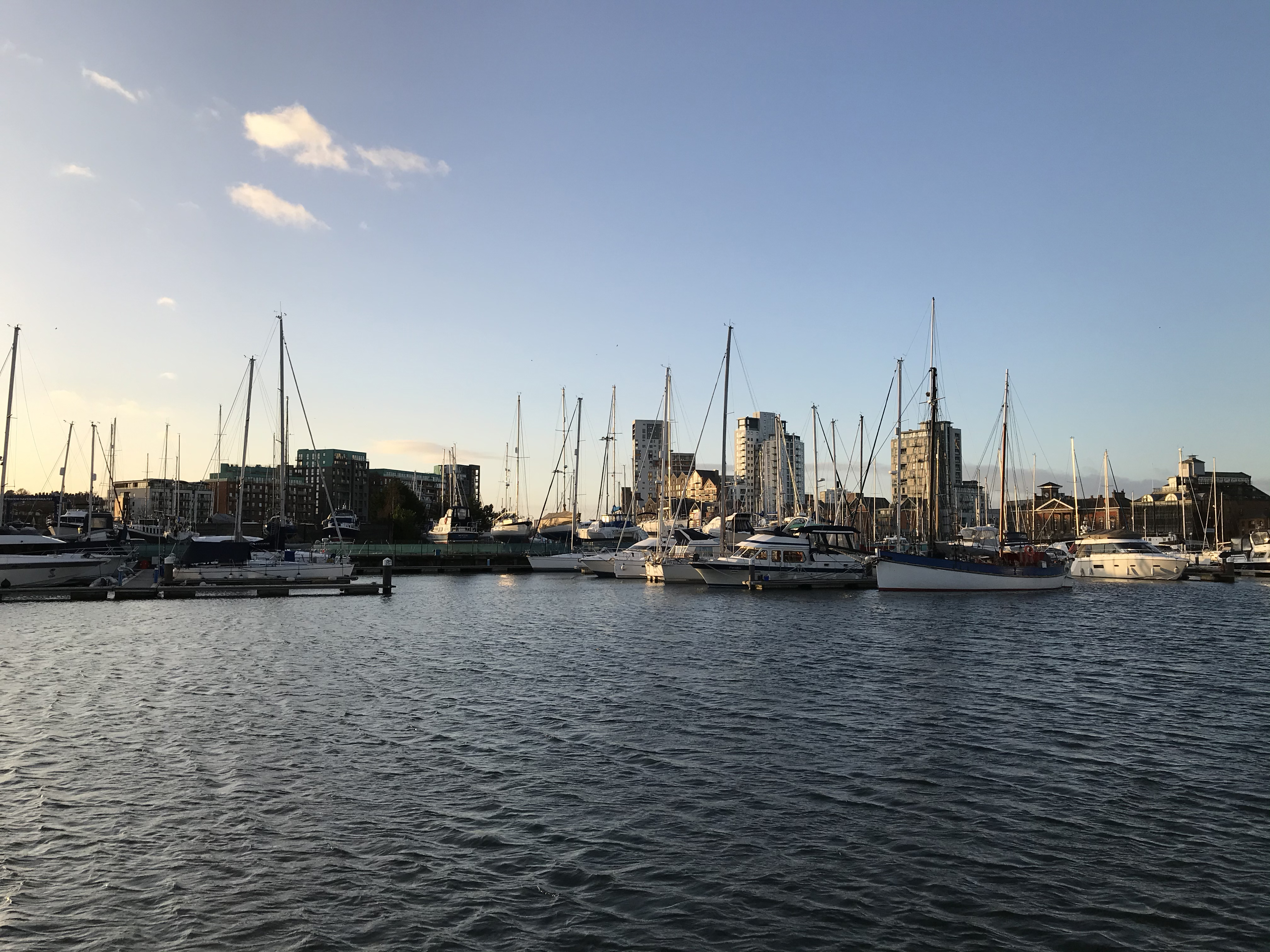
The Ipswich Waterfront skyline

List of tallest buildings in Ipswich ranks the tallest buildings and structures within the English town of Ipswich, Suffolk. The list includes buildings which have since been demolished or are currently under construction. The tallest building in the town is The Mill, which rises 68.1 metres (223.4 ft) and was topped out in 2009.

== History ==
=== 20th century ===
One of the first major 'building booms' was in the 1960s and 1970s known as the Greyfriars development. The project consisted of large plazas, office blocks and residential towers. The project was not received well and in the 1990s, most of the project was destroyed. Surviving buildings were revamped in the 1980s and 1990s, these included St Francis Court and St Clare House. The rest of the development was demolished to make way for the Willis Building.

=== 21st century ===
In recent years the town of Ipswich has experienced a building boom, especially on the outskirts such as Ravenswood and Kesgrave. Ipswich dock, known as the waterfront has seen huge investment in two separate projects as part of the waterfront regeneration project. The Mill was a development of the tallest building in Ipswich but the interior was never finished due to financial difficulty. The other project was the Regatta Quay redevelopment which consisted of two large residential blocks. The Cambria was completed but The Winerack was never completed as the bank funding the project went bankrupt, the building was left in a skeletal state. As of 2019, construction on The Winerack has started with the completion date set for the end of 2020.

During 2015 another small 'building boom' started, firstly with the redevelopment of Stoke Quay. The development consisted of a large residential building called Stoke Quay Genesis that has 386 homes at a total cost of £36 million. The main contractor was ISG.

Princes Street in the town centre will see the construction of two large office buildings. The old Fisons building is undergoing a £9 million redevelopemt into a newer office building. The construction was expected to be completed in 2016, being built by PDR construction Ltd. The law firm, Birketts LLP is going to build a large HQ on the site of Riley's Pool Hall, which is going to be demolished after their administration announcement. The developers of the plan are Churchmanor Estates.

== Tallest buildings and structures ==
Building or structure was demolished
Building or structure is under construction or on hold

An equal sign (=) following a rank indicates the same height between two or more buildings. Only structures taller than 30m are listed.

Rank	Name	Use	Image	Height m/ft	Floors	Year	Notes
1	The Mill	Residential and Commercial		68.1 metres (223.4 ft)	23	Unfinished	Despite being topped out in 2009, most of the residential interior of the building has yet to be complete due to the 2008 financial crisis. The building's height may have to be reduced by 1-2 floors in the near future due to structural issues.
2	The Winerack	Residential and Commercial		60.2 metres (197.5 ft)	21	2020	As of 2020, work on the Winerack has finished after the building remained an empty shell on the Ipswich skyline due to construction being halted after the 2008 financial crisis.The Winerack building is to the middle left of the photo.
3	St Francis Court	Residential and Commercial		52 metres (170.6 ft)	17	1966	
4	St Mary-le-Tower	Religious		51 metres (167.3 ft)	3	1862	The site of St. Mary-le-Tower has been occupied by a church since at least the compilation of the Domesday Book of 1086.
5	Suffolk House	Office		50 metres (164.0 ft)	10	1969	
6	St Clare House	Office		49 metres (160.8 ft)	12	1966	
7=	Guardian Royal Exchange building	Office		46 metres (150.9 ft)	10	1970	This building was built as an extension for Suffolk House and is currently owned by AXA.
7=	The Cambria	Residential		46 metres (150.9 ft)	16	2009	
9	Orwell Bridge	Bridge		45 metres (147.6 ft)	N/A	1982	
10	The Civic Centre	Office and Governmental		44 metres (144.4 ft)	14	1969–2009	The building was used by Ipswich Borough Council who relocated to Grafton House.
11=	Ipswich Hospital Maternity Block	Hospital		41 metres (134.5 ft)	11	1969	The hospital was founded in 1909.
11=	St Vincent House	Office		41 metres (134.5 ft)	11	1967	
11=	LDH (La Doria) LTD Distribution Centre	Industrial		41 metres (134.5 ft)	N/A	2019	
14	Suffolk New College	Educational		40 metres (131.2 ft)	8	1959–2010	The main tower of the college being prepared for demolition in 2009, a new college building has since been built.
15=	Osprey Court	Residential		38 metres (124.7 ft)	11	2015	The Osprey Court building is to the left of the photo.
15=	Avalon Court	Residential		38 metres (124.7 ft)	11	2015	
17=	10 Reavell Place	Residential		37 metres (121.4 ft)	12	2010	
17=	Cumberland Towers	Residential		37 metres (121.4 ft)	12	1966	The Cumberland Towers building is located behind the houses in this photo.
19=	R&W Paul Ltd Silo	Industrial		36 metres (118.1 ft)	9	1960s	Exact year of construction is unknown.
19=	Cardinal Lofts	Residential		36 metres (118.1 ft)	10	2004	Cardinal Lofts may be demolished in the near future due to safety issues. The Cardinal Lofts building is the red and white building visible in the photo.
21	Waterfront Building	Educational		35 metres (114.8 ft)	7	2008	
22=	The Spectrum	Residential		34 metres (111.5 ft)	7	2015	
22=	The Mill House	Residential		34 metres (111.5 ft)	10	2009	
22=	Capstan House	Residential		34 metres (111.5 ft)	11	2006	The Capstan House building is located to the right of the photo.
22=	Neptune Marina	Residential and Commercial		34 metres (111.5 ft)	10	2005	The Neptune Marina building is to the right of the photo.
22=	Focus Apartments	Residential	No picture available	34 metres (111.5 ft)	8	1965	
22=	Eclipse Court	Residential		34 metres (111.5 ft)	10	2015	The Eclipse Court building is in the middle left of the photo.
28	Athena Hall	Residential		31 metres (101.7 ft)	9	2010	
29	St Lawrence Church	Religious		30 metres (98.4 ft)	N/A	1449	The 15th-century church has the oldest set of church bells in the world.

== Timeline of tallest buildings ==
Rank	Name	Image	Height m/ft	Floors	Years tallest	Notes
1	The Mill		68.1 metres (223.4 ft)	23	2009–present	
2	St Francis Court		52 metres (170.6 ft)	17	1966-2009	
3	St Mary le Tower		51 metres (167.3 ft)	3	1862-1966	
4	St Lawrence Church		30 metres (98.4 ft)	N/A	1449-1862	
