= East Suffolk County Hall =

County building in Ipswich, East Suffolk, England

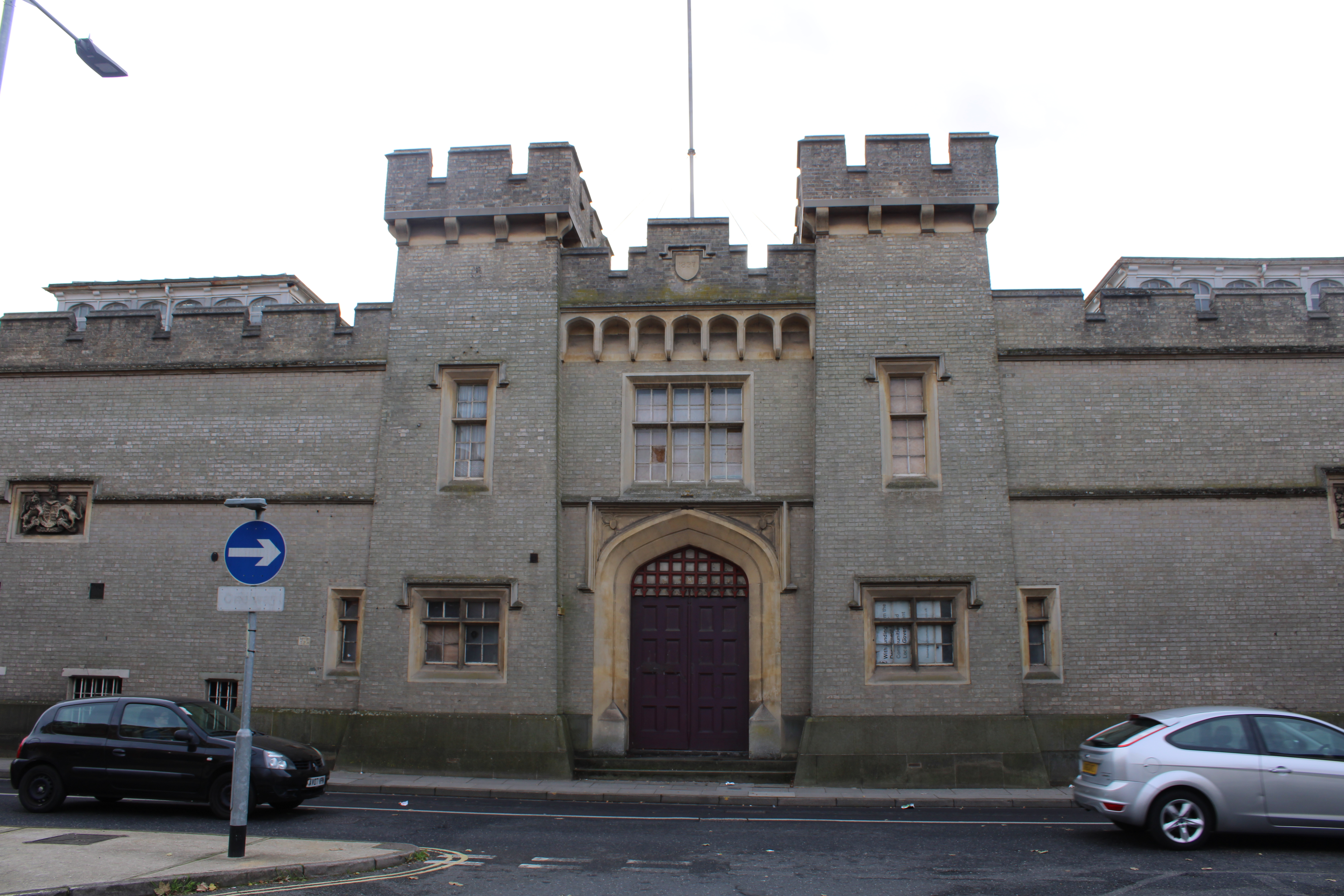
- The central section of the main entrance block

- Location within Suffolk
- 52.0566°N 1.1618°E
- Location: Ipswich, Suffolk

History
- Built: 1837

Site notes
- Architect: William McIntosh Brooks
- Architectural style: Tudor style

Listed Building – Grade II
- Designated: 4 August 1972
- Reference no.: 1207685

East Suffolk County Hall is a historic building located in St Helen's Street in Ipswich. The building, which was the headquarters of East Suffolk County Council until 1974 and then of Suffolk County Council until 2004, is a Grade II listed building.

== History ==
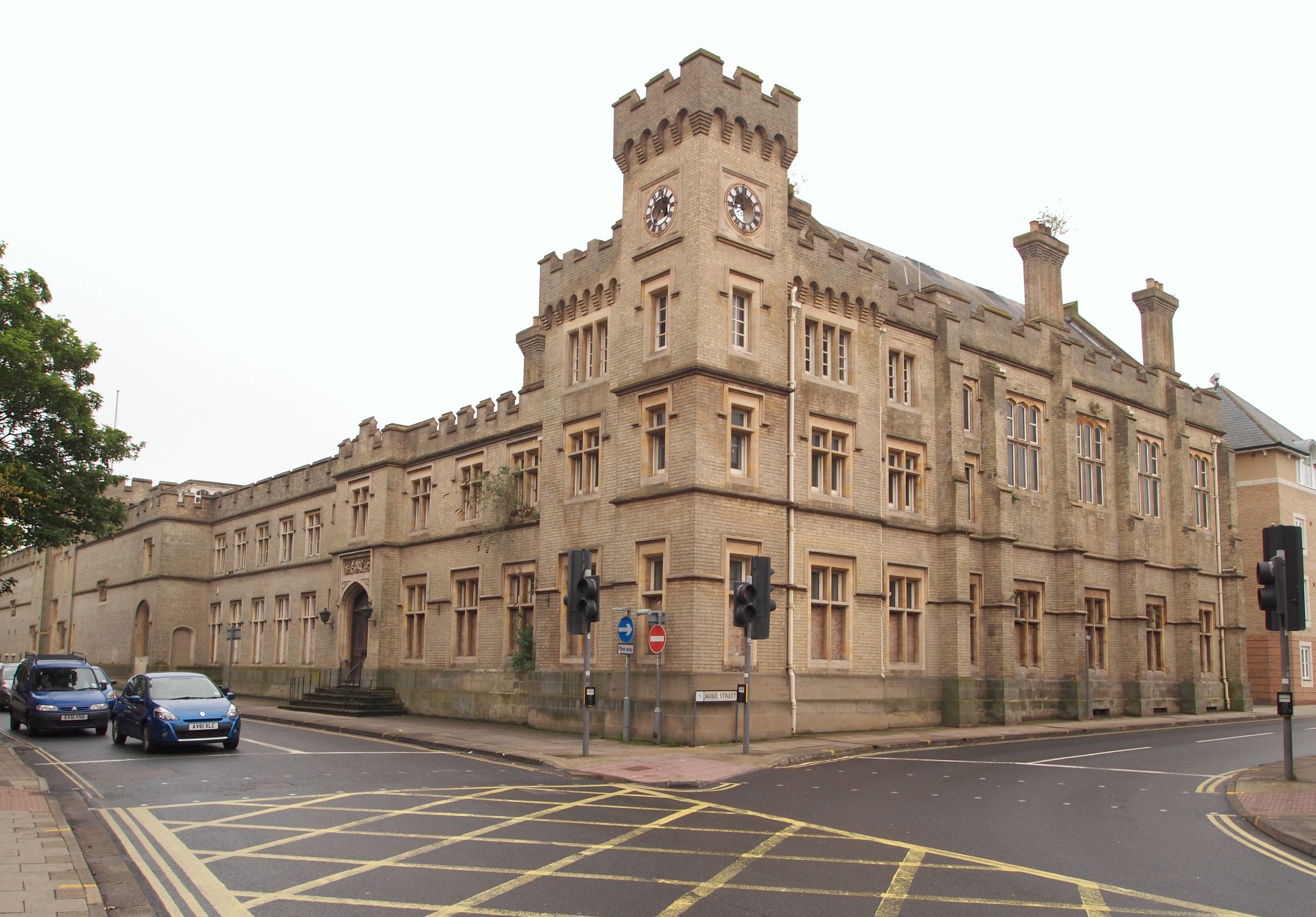
St Helen's Court (the west wing of the complex)

The oldest part of the building was designed by William McIntosh Brooks in the Tudor style and completed in 1837. The design for this building, known as the "main entrance block", involved a roughly symmetrical 150 feet (46 m) main frontage facing St Helen's Street; the central section featured an arched doorway on the ground floor and a transomed window on the first floor flanked by twin castellated towers; there were also castellated side wings and two end pavilions which were slightly projected forwards.

The building was originally used as a prison and as a facility for dispensing justice but, following the implementation of the Local Government Act 1888, which established county councils in every county, it also became necessary to find a meeting place for East Suffolk County Council. Extensions to the main building, designed by John Corder and Henry Miller, which included a wing to the east known as "St Andrew's House" and a wing to the west known as "St Helen's Court", were completed for this purpose in 1906. St Helen's Court included a clock tower, the clock for which was a gift from the High Sheriff of Suffolk, Sir Thomas Henry Tacon. Internally, the principal room was the council chamber which was located on the first floor of St Helen's Court; there were offices on the ground floor below the council chamber.

The proceedings for the divorce between Wallis Simpson and Ernest Simpson took place at the county hall with the decree nisi being granted on 27 October 1936. This was followed, on 16 November 1936, by the decision of King Edward VIII to announce his intention to marry Wallis Simpson which itself led to the abdication crisis.

Following the implementation of the Local Government Act 1972 the building became the headquarters of Suffolk County Council in 1974; it continued to serve in that role until the county council decided to move out of the building to more modern premises in 2003. The Council moved to Endeavour House in Ipswich the following year and County Hall was acquired by a developer in 2005. After significant deterioration in the condition of the building, it was placed on the local buildings at risk register in 2011.

A planning application to carry out urgent repairs was submitted in October 2019 and planning consent was given for the conversion of the building into some 40 apartments in January 2020.
