= St Francis Court =

Residential tower in Ipswich, England

St Francis Tower
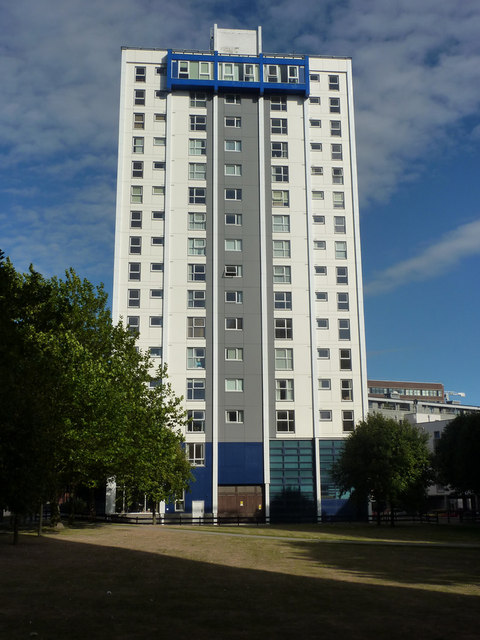

- Location within Suffolk
- Former names: St Franciscan Tower and Ipswich Central

General information
- Status: Completed
- Type: Residential
- Location: 23 Franciscan Way, Ipswich, Suffolk IP1 1NA, Ipswich, England
- Coordinates: 52.0548°N 1.1506°E
- Completed: 1962
- Renovated: 2005

Height
- Height: 52 m (171 ft)

Technical details
- Material: Concrete
- Floor count: 16
- Lifts/elevators: 2

Other information
- Number of rooms: 116

St Francis Tower, originally named Franciscan Tower, is the 3rd tallest building in Ipswich, England. It is 172 feet (52 m) high, with eight flats on each of its 16 floors. It is on Franciscan Way in central Ipswich.

== History ==
The 16-floor building was built in the early 1960s as part of the Greyfriars development designed by Edward Skipper & Associates. It was one of the project's most important buildings, as it provided homes for people who worked in the Greyfriars Development. The development was not well received, however; and in the 1980s and 1990s, was partially revamped and the rest destroyed. The all-concrete building was recladded and renamed St Francis Court in the 1990s.

== Fire ==
In 2001 a fire broke out on the 7th floor of the tower which led to seven people being sent to the local hospital. This was the sixth fire that broke out in the block in five years, this being the most serious. It took 70 firefighters and 12 fire engines to put the fire out. It was unclear of what the cause of the fire was but a number of explosions were a result of carbon based materials getting too hot.
