= Deborah Cadman =

British politician (born 1963)

Deborah Ann Cadman OBE (born 11 February 1963 in Birmingham, UK) was the Chief Executive of Birmingham City Council from June 2021 to April 2024 at the time of failed Oracle implementation and was the first permanent Chief Executive of the newly created West Midlands Combined Authority (WMCA). Cadman's appointment was announced in June 2017 and she took on the role in September of the same year, before moving to the City Council on 14 June 2021. Cadman has a bachelor's degree in Social Administration and Politics from Loughborough University and two master's degrees in Urban and Regional Economics, and Management.

Before joining WMCA, Cadman was Chief Executive of Suffolk County Council (2011–2017). She had previously been head of the East of England Development Agency (and presided over its abolition) and before that Chief Executive of St Edmundsbury Borough Council in Suffolk.

Cadman started her career in 1984 at the engineering department of the London Borough of Newham. Her next post was in Birmingham, managing a voluntary sector project in Handsworth and developing partnerships and community strategies. After joining Birmingham City Council as an economic development officer, she worked on some of the largest urban regeneration projects in the country. During this period she also worked on major policy projects and public and private sector ventures while gaining her first master's degree in economics.

In 1996 Cadman moved to Redcar and Cleveland Borough Council as Head of Policy. She was responsible for regeneration, social policy, partnerships and "best value". She was also a member of the National Charities Lotteries Board Advisory Committee in the North East. During this time she gained a second master's degree in management.

Cadman then moved to the Department of Environment, Transport and the Regions as Local Government Advisor to the Ministerial Team. She worked with senior civil servants on local government legislation, advised ministers and provided direct support to councils in the East of England on the modernisation agenda.

A move to the Audit Commission left Cadman responsible for inspections in the London region and management of corporate governance inspections in Walsall, Enfield and Hackney, working with local government to develop sustainable improvement plans.

Cadman's first Chief Executive post was at St Edmundsbury Borough Council, which gained 'excellent' performing status in 2007 (having previously been 'fair'). She was also interim Chief Executive of Waveney District Council between January and March 2008.

Cadman was appointed an OBE in 2006 for services to local government. She is married to Geoff Rivers, who also succeeded her as Chief Executive at St Edmundsbury Council. She was awarded an honorary degree by Loughborough University in 2023 for her success and services in urban regeneration and local government, as well as her work that has championed equality, diversity and inclusion.
