= The Mill (building) =

Coordinates: 52.0523°N 1.1554°E

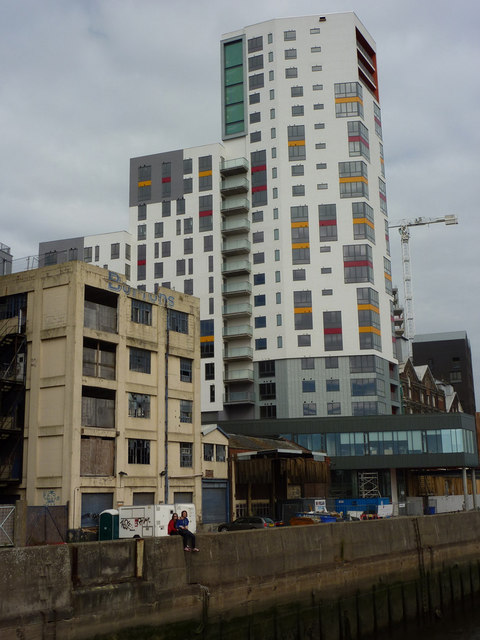
- The Mill as seen from Stoke Bridge

- Location within Suffolk

General information
- Status: On hold
- Type: Residential
- Architectural style: postmodernism
- Location: The Mill, Foundry Lane, Ipswich, Suffolk, United Kingdom
- Construction started: 2007
- Completed: 2009; 17 years ago
- Cost: £42 million
- Owner: City Living Developments (Ipswich) Ltd
- Operator: John Howard

Height
- Height: 71.00m

Technical details
- Material: concrete
- Floor count: 23

Design and construction
- Architect: John Lyall Architects
- Developer: City Living Developments (Ipswich) Ltd
- Main contractor: Laing O'Rourke

The Mill is a 23 storey, mixed-use development located on the Ipswich Waterfront with access from College Street in Ipswich, Suffolk, England, consisting of 215 flats and 1 commercial unit, across 2 different buildings, the main white tower, and The Mill House. The Mill is the tallest building in Ipswich, and the tallest in Suffolk, standing at 71 metres (232 feet) tall, and construction of the development started in 2007 by contractor Laing O'Rourke, and finished in 2009.

The Mill is part of the Albion Quay redevelopment scheme on the waterfront, and was built at a cost of £42 million and was designed by John Lyall Architects and was proposed to be the 'landmark' building of Ipswich. The development had financial difficulties and only some parts of the development were fitted out.

== Design ==
The Mill consists of 215 apartments, offices, shops and restaurants. There is a paved courtyard in the centre of the development which provides access from College Street to the waterfront. The main tower's exterior was completed in 2009, but the interior was left unfinished.

The main tower was designed to make the building visible from the town centre, and is constructed out of concrete, cladded with white polystyrene tiles with splashes of colour to create a landmark of Ipswich. The base of the building is home to the highly successful Jerwood Dancehouse, which is cladded in dark zinc panels.

The Mill House, another building in the development, is built with dark bricks and cladding to reflect the look of the historic Cranfield Mill that was formerly at the site of The Mill.

== Cladding and structural issues ==
In 2014, fire experts warned that the Expanded Polystyrene (EPS) cladding on The Mill was so unsafe that all residents should be moved out.

In 2023, residents of The Mill protested outside of RSM UK's offices in Bury St Edmunds, the building's former administrators, due to unresolved cladding and structural problems. The Mill's residents said they felt like "prisoners in their own homes", because their properties have become worthless due to the unsafe cladding.

Tom Hunt, Ipswich's MP, raised The Mill in Prime Minister's Questions in 2024, and later, a report showed that repairs and cladding replacement work at The Mill would cost upwards of £30 million, and if that price cannot be justified, The Mill would be demolished. In April 2024, the decision was made to repair The Mill.

Property developer John Howard bought The Mill for £1 in July 2024, and will redevelop The Mill. The work is planned to start within a year, and will be done in two stages. The first stage will see the recladding of the 215 occupied flats, and the second will see the recladding of the main tower, and the fitting out of 80 new flats.

John Howard also said that two or three floors from the top of The Mill might need to be taken down to help solve structural issues, but they could possibly be replaced with a lighter structure.

== Damage ==
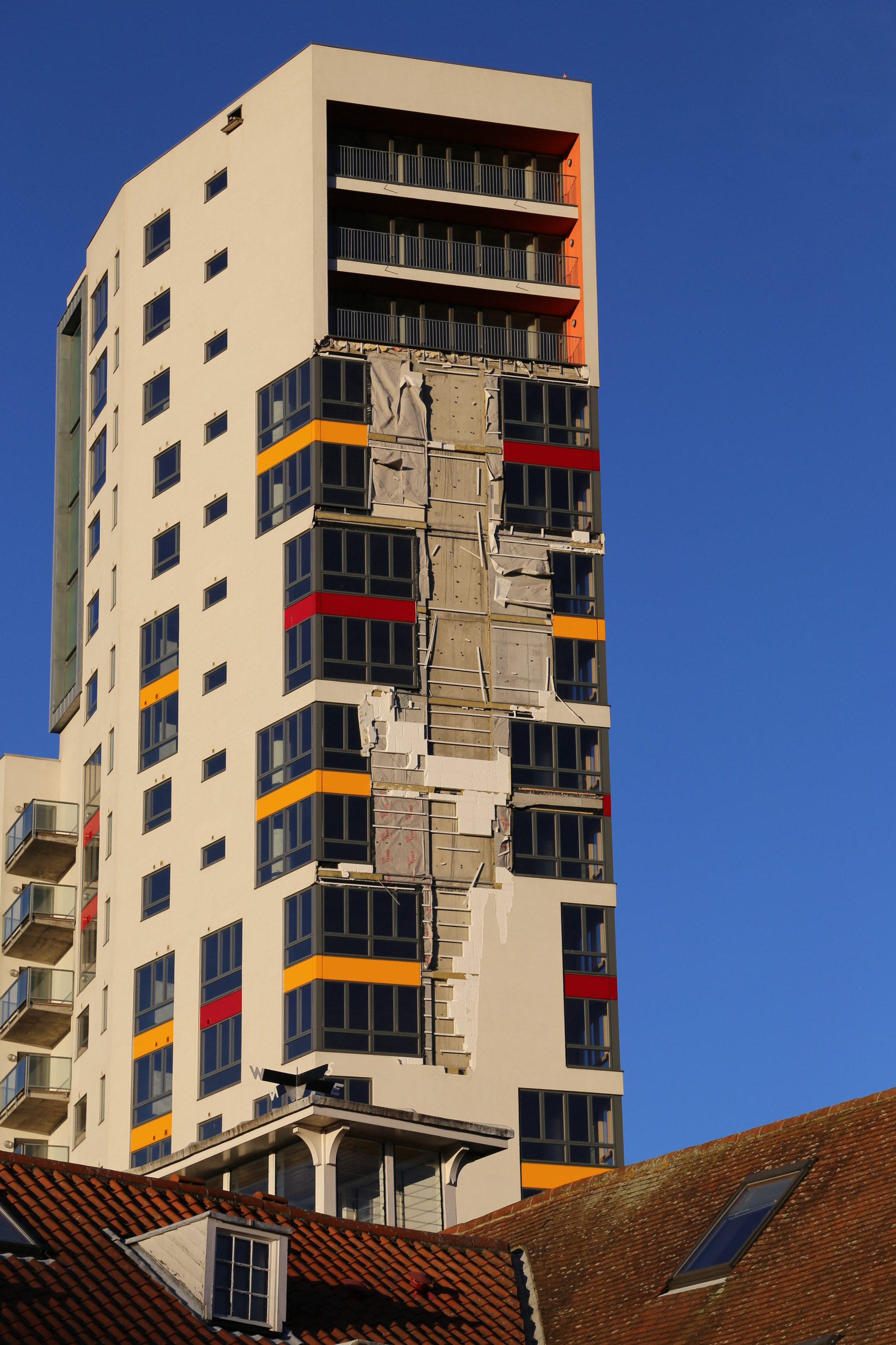
Damage to Cranfield Mill, taken from Dock Street

In October 2013 The Mill was subject to gale force winds causing damage which resulted in a road closure and criticism of the building's design. After a storm, many of The Mill's polystyrene cladding tiles were ripped from the south facing façade. The building was assessed as there was many concerns of more cladding peeling off. The damage was not severe but the building aesthetics suffered as the concrete skeleton became exposed.

As of April 2024, the damage has not been repaired but the damaged south façade has had most remaining panels removed due to cladding issues caused by new regulations. There are also still ownership struggles at the block.

== Financial difficulties ==
The company City Living Developments (Ipswich) Ltd had been involved with many commercial and residential projects along the waterfront including The Mill and The Regatta Quay hit financial difficulties after borrowing from the Anglo Irish and Allied Irish banks who went into administration. The project ran out of money and the interior of the main tower was never completed.

== See also ==
- List of tallest buildings and structures in Ipswich
