= Kesgrave High School =

Location
- Main Road; Ipswich, Suffolk, IP5 2PB; England; 52°04′01″N 1°14′39″E

Information
- Type: Academy
- Department for Education URN: 136969 Tables
- Ofsted: Reports
- Headteacher: Julia Upton
- Gender: Coeducational
- Age: 11 to 18
- Enrolment: 1847
- Website: kesgrave.suffolk.sch.uk

Kesgrave High School is a co-educational secondary school and sixth form with academy status in Kesgrave in the English county of Suffolk. The school has over 1800 pupils aged 11 to 18.

The school has been awarded Eco-school status and has 20 solar panels on top of the technology block. It has been awarded the Green Flag Award, becoming the first school in the region to have achieved such a feat. A study for Sustrans noted that 61% of the pupils cycled to the school. This is largely due to the installation of a large cycle lane through the housing estate and along the main road. The school actively encourages walking or cycling and provides bicycle storage facilities.

The school has undergone extension in recent years, including the construction of a creative media department, a communications block, a PE block and a sixth form block. The school underwent further extension in the Summer of 2013 with the demolishing of the History block, one of the oldest blocks in the school, and the building of the new humanities block which was completed in April 2014. In 2018, a new 'Gallery Café' was built along with the construction of the ethics and philosophy block.

Ofsted rated it as good following the most recent inspection. Prior to this, the school had been rated as outstanding. Kesgrave High School was the first school in Britain to ban skirts for girls.

On 24 June 2015, the school's Space Club achieved the world record for the highest altitude paper plane launch, reaching an altitude of 35,043 meters.

The school uses the house system.
