= Ipswich Village Development =

Coordinates: 52.0546°N 1.1442°E

The Ipswich Village Development is a 125-acre area, situated around Portman Road stadium, Ipswich England. The main road of the development is Russell Road which was built to House TXU Corporation and bring the corporation under one roof however Suffolk County Council bought the building after the energy company hit financial difficulties, Russell Road is also home to the Ipswich Crown Court and is also home Ipswich Borough Council and Smart Energy are located opposite in Grafton House. Ipswich Crown Court is located at the start of Russell Road as well as number of government and political companies being housed on the road.

Constantine Road is also located in the development which has a multi-storey car park built for Endeavour House and Grafton House. Also located on the road is the old bus station of Ipswich.

== History ==
The development is all part of the Ipswich master plan, which plans to redevelop areas of Ipswich including the town centre, Ipswich Village is planned to be finished in 2016. The first stage of the development was Endeavour House to house TXU Corporation, however Suffolk County Council bought the building as TXU hit financial problems. The Development has planned to build a multi-storey car park on the old cattle market site. However the development was never finished and the site around the area remain derelict. These sites include; the area behind Grafton House, the space along the River Gipping (originally planned for a Tesco but they pulled out) and the space behind the old tram house on Constantine road.

== Notable buildings ==
=== Endeavour House ===
Endeavour House was built by the TXU Corporation who wanted a large UK office with an original construction cost of £28 million. However, in late 2002 the US based company went into administration. They put the uncompleted building up for sale and in 2003, Suffolk County Council bought the building for £16 million. Endeavour house was constructed by M&S contractors and was designed by TTSP architects. The design consists of two office structures connected with an open converse with stairs and lifts in the centre rising 5 storey's. The office building is one of the most sustainable office buildings in Europe upon completion with 50,000 photovoltaic cells.

=== Grafton House ===
Completed in 2006, Grafton House is home to Ipswich Borough Council and smart energy, designed by Consarc Consulting Architects. The 6 storey building is located opposite Endeavour House and consists of 60,000 sq feet of office space with mixed retail units at ground level including a coffee shop.

=== Ipswich Crown Court ===
Ipswich Crown Court is located on 1 Russell Road, Ipswich Crown Court was part of the new build Crown Courts project in Ipswich and Cambridge. The Private finance initiative project was Designed by Austin-Smith Lord LLP architects, construction on both projects started in April 2002 and both were completed by November 2004. The main contractor of Ipswich Crown Court was Mowlem.

=== Portman Road Stadium ===
Portman Road Stadium is an association football stadium in Ipswich, Suffolk, England. It has been the home ground of Ipswich Town F.C. since 1884. The stadium has also hosted a number of England youth international matches, and one senior England friendly international match, against Croatia in 2003. It has staged several other sporting events, including athletics meetings and international hockey matches.
