= Felixstowe Academy =

Felixstowe School

Location
- High Street; Felixstowe, Suffolk, IP11 9QR; England
- Coordinates: 51°58′09″N 1°20′03″E

Information
- Type: Academy
- Department for Education URN: 137321 Tables
- Ofsted: Reports
- Chair of Governors: S Leon
- Headteacher: E Wilson-Downes
- Gender: Coeducational
- Age: 11 to 19
- Enrolment: 1'140
- Houses: Cranbrook, Euston, Grafton, Helmingham, Stradbroke
- Website: http://www.fxa.org.uk/

Felixstowe School is a secondary school and sixth form with academy status, located in Felixstowe, Suffolk, England.

The school was formed in September 2011 from the merger of Orwell High School and Deben High School. Formerly, the school operated from both of these school sites, before all pupils were later accommodated by the recently constructed new buildings at the former Orwell High School site, with the old Deben High School premise being closed. Felixstowe School's new buildings cost approximately £19 million, and were officially opened for teaching on Monday 28 April 2014.

The school was previously sponsored by AET but from September 2019, it was taken over by a local Suffolk trust, Unity Schools Partnership, who sponsor a number of successful schools across the county.

The school offers further education (FE) courses, primarily at A Level, but also several specialised vocational courses.

In 2017, the school received an 'inadequate' rating from Ofsted. In 2021, the school was judged to no longer require Special Measures and Ofsted graded the school as "Requires Improvement"

== History ==
Orwell High School was a medium size secondary community school with Specialist Technology College status.

In 2006 the school was issued with a notice to improve. There was a subsequent inspection in 2007 in which the school was seen to be making "satisfactory progress" and therefore the notice to improve was revoked. In 2010 51% of Orwell candidates gained five GCSEs at grades A* to C including English and Maths. In October 2009 OFSTED stated that the school was satisfactory, but Leadership and Management and the Capacity to Improve were both good.

In September 2009 the school became a foundation school supported by the charitable Felixstowe Learning Trust.

The Executive Headteacher, Robert Cawley, started at the school in 2010. The previous Headteacher, Peter Tomkins from his post in May 2010. A statement from John Barker, the Chair of Governors, thanked Peter for his hard work and dedication.

In September 2011 the school was formally merged with Deben High School, to form Felixstowe Academy. Following concerns over the leadership and management of the academy, the previous Academy Trust was given Notice to Terminate. They ceased to have control in September 2019. The school is now sponsored by the Unity Schools Partnership. The school changed its name from Felixstowe Academy to Felixstowe School in September 2020, to bring the focus back onto the purpose of schooling and education.

== Notable former pupils ==
=== Deben High School ===
- Paul Boyle, Vice-Chancellor since 2014 of the University of Leicester, Chief Executive from 2010 to 2014 of the Economic and Social Research Council (ESRC), and Professor of Human Geography from 1999 to 2010 at the University of St Andrews, President from 2011 to 2014 of Science Europe and from 2007 to 2009 of the British Society for Population Studies

=== Felixstowe Grammar School ===
- David Mann, Chief Executive from 1987 to 1994 of Logica, and President from 1994 to 1995 of the British Computer Society (BCS)
- Sir Mervyn Pedelty Chief Executive from 1997 to 2004 of The Co-operative Bank
- Christopher Strauli, actor, father
