= Grafton House =

Office building in Ipswich, Suffolk, England

Coordinates: 52°3′13.3″N 1°8′35.6″E

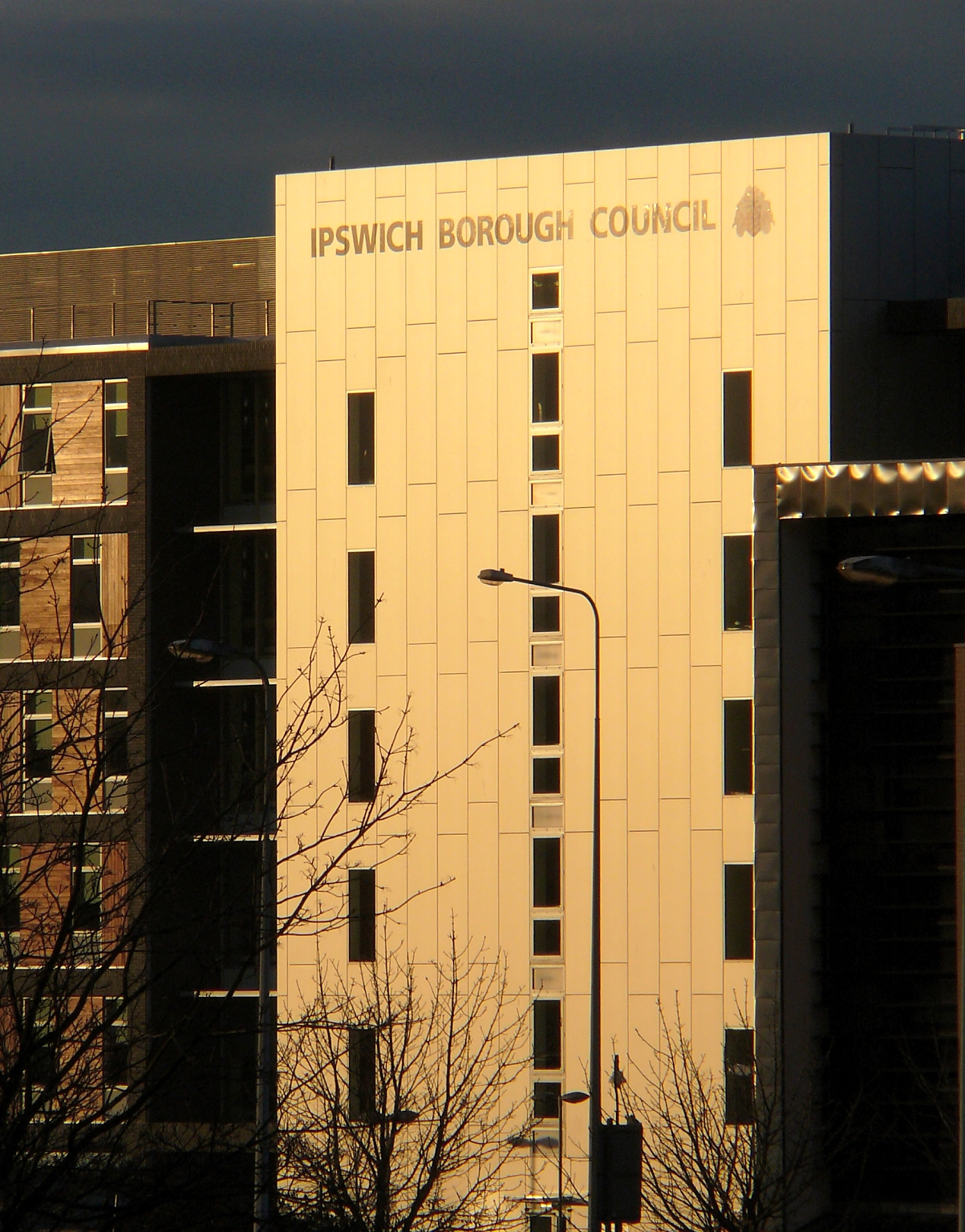
Ipswich Borough Council Headquarters, Ipswich, Grafton House from W End Road.

Grafton House (known as Ipswich Borough Council HQ) is the headquarters for Ipswich Borough Council and Smartest Energy. Located on Russell Road opposite Endeavour House, Grafton House is a 6-storey building and was designed by Consarc Consulting Architects and construction was completed in 2006 as part of the Ipswich Village Development. The building consists of mixed retail units at ground level including a coffee shop and 60,000 sq feet of office space. Grafton House was also classed as 'very good' by BREEAM standards.

== Design ==
The building is constructed with an in situ cast post tensioned concrete frame sits on top of piled foundations with Precast brickwork spandrels and columns frame openings. The exterior walls are aluminium curtain walling, with timber windows, external rendering, timber and rain screen cladding. The building can hold 500 people and makes the most of a small site. There is car parking to the rear of the building and there is also a multi-storey car park (shared with Endeavour House) with access from Constantine Road.

The buildings design is very urban and has a very simple floor plan. The building is split into 3, each linked with a small glass corridor to break up the long narrow floor plan. The construction also kept the existing trees along Russell Road and added a modern sculpture next to the entrance to add an urban feel.
