= Suffolk County Council =

Governmental body in England

Type
- Type: Non-metropolitan county

Leadership
- Chair: Louis Busuttil, Reform since 21 May 2026
- Leader: Michael Hadwen, Reform since 21 May 2026
- Joint Chief Executives: Andrew Cook and Mark Ash since 1 April 2026

Structure
- Seats: 70 seats
- Graph of the party split among 70 seats.
- Political groups: Administration (40) Reform UK (41) Opposition (30) Green (13) Conservative (10) Labour (3) Liberal Democrats (2) Independent (2)
- Length of term: 4 years

Elections
- Voting system: First-past-the-post
- Last election: 7 May 2026

Meeting place
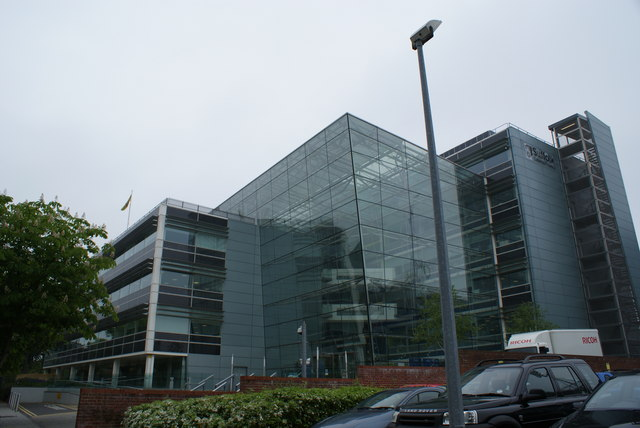
- Endeavour House, 8 Russell Road, Ipswich, IP1 2BX

Website
- www.suffolk.gov.uk

Suffolk County Council is the upper-tier local authority for the county of Suffolk, England. It is run by 70 elected county councillors representing 69 divisions. It is a member of the East of England Local Government Association.

The council has been under Reform UK majority control since 2026. Prior to that, it was under Conservative majority control from 2005. It is based at Endeavour House in Ipswich.

== History ==
Elected county councils were created in 1889 under the Local Government Act 1888, taking over administrative functions that had previously been performed by unelected magistrates at the court of quarter sessions. In most counties the quarter sessions were held at a single location, but in Suffolk the custom was long-established of holding the quarter sessions across several days, sitting in different towns. Prior to 1860 the court sat in the four towns of Beccles, Bury St Edmunds, Ipswich and Woodbridge. In 1860 the Beccles and Woodbridge divisions merged with the Ipswich one to form the eastern division, and the area administered from Bury St Edmunds became known as the western division.

Officially it remained one court of quarter sessions which adjourned after each day of hearings and travelled to a new venue, and the original draft bill in 1888 therefore envisaged that there would be a single Suffolk County Council. As the bill progressed through its parliamentary processes an amendment was proposed by Frederick Hervey, 3rd Marquess of Bristol, who lived at Ickworth House near Bury St Edmunds, that the eastern and western divisions of the county should instead become separate administrative counties. The amendment was agreed by 59 votes to 20 in the House of Lords. It was also agreed that the borough of Ipswich was large enough to provide its own county-level functions and so it was made a county borough. Suffolk therefore had three county-level authorities after 1889: West Suffolk County Council, East Suffolk County Council and Ipswich Corporation.

This system continued until 1974, when the Local Government Act 1972 abolished the separate county councils for East Suffolk and West Suffolk and downgraded Ipswich to providing district-level services only. In their place, Suffolk County Council was created with responsibility for county-level services across the whole county. Initially based at East Suffolk County Hall in Ipswich, the council relocated to Endeavour House in 2004.

In September 2010, the council announced that it would seek to outsource a number of its services, in an attempt to cut its budget by 30%. Controversy surrounding the then chief executive Andrea Hill, some concerning £122,000 spent on management consultants, featured in the local and national press in 2011; this led to her facing a disciplinary hearing, and subsequently resigning.

In March 2026, the government announced local government reorganisation plans, which would have seen the county council abolished in 2028 and local government across Suffolk reorganised into three unitary authorities. These proposals were withdrawn in September 2026.

== Governance ==
Suffolk County Council provides county-level services. District-level services are provided by the area's five district councils:

- Babergh District Council
- East Suffolk District Council
- Ipswich Borough Council
- Mid Suffolk District Council
- West Suffolk District Council

With the exception of Ipswich, the rest of the county is covered by civil parishes, which form a third tier of local government.

=== Political control ===
The council has been under Reform UK majority control since 2026.

The first election to the county council was held in 1973, initially operating as a shadow authority alongside the outgoing authorities until the new arrangements came into effect on 1 April 1974. Political control of the council since 1974 has been as follows:

Party in control	Years
Conservative	1974–1993
No overall control	1993–2005
Conservative	2005–2016
No overall control	2016–2017
Conservative	2017–2026
Reform	2026–present

=== Leadership ===
The leaders of the council since 1984 have been:

Councillor	Party	From	To
Christopher Penn	Conservative	1984	18 May 1993
Chris Mole	Labour	18 May 1993	22 Nov 2001
Jane Hore	Labour	18 Dec 2001	22 May 2003
Bryony Rudkin	Labour	22 May 2003	May 2005
Jeremy Pembroke	Conservative	26 May 2005	1 Apr 2011
Mark Bee	Conservative	26 May 2011	21 May 2015
Colin Noble	Conservative	21 May 2015	24 May 2018
Matthew Hicks	Conservative	24 May 2018	May 2026
Michael Hadwen	Reform	21 May 2026	

=== Composition ===
Following the 2026 election, the composition of the council was:

Party	Councillors
Reform	41
Green	13
Conservative	9
Labour	3
Liberal Democrats	2
Independent	2
Total	70

In February 2025, the government postponed the elections that were due to take place in May 2025 for a year, to allow for alternative local government structures for the area to be considered.

== Premises ==
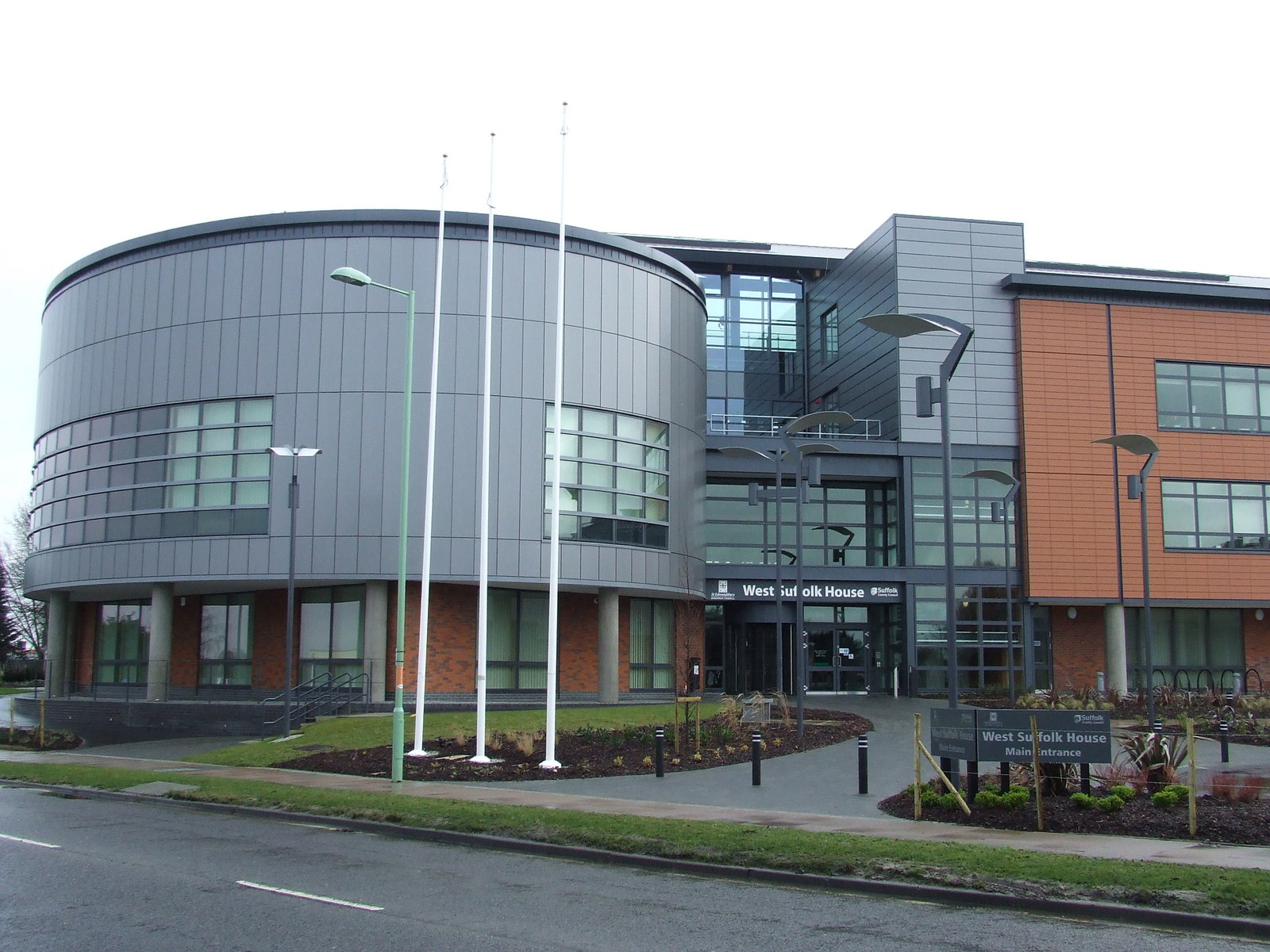
West Suffolk House, the council's area office in Bury St Edmunds, shared with West Suffolk Council.

The council is based at Endeavour House at 8 Russell Road in Ipswich. It also maintains area offices in Bury St Edmunds and Lowestoft. Endeavour House was built in 2003. It was originally commissioned as private offices but was bought by the county council whilst still under construction; the council moved into the building in 2004. Since 2017 the council has shared the building with Babergh District Council and Mid Suffolk District Council.

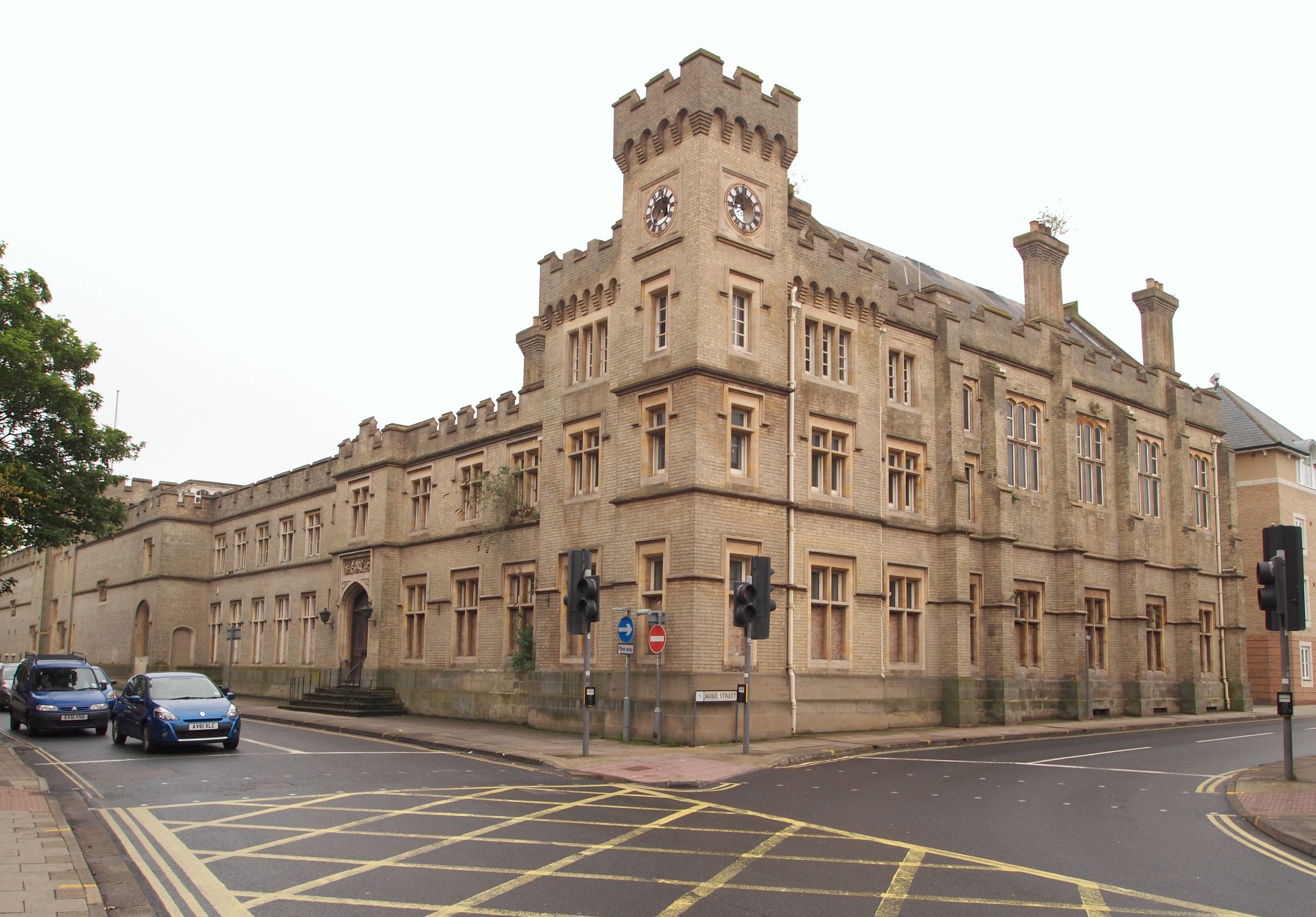
County Hall, St Helen's Street, Ipswich: Council's headquarters until 2004.

Previously the council was based at County Hall on St Helen's Street in Ipswich, the oldest parts of which had been built in 1837 as a jail and courthouse, which had been one of the meeting places of the quarter sessions. The building had become the meeting place of East Suffolk County Council after 1889, and that council had built substantial extensions to the building, notably in 1906 with an office block, new council chamber and clock tower at the corner of St Helen's Street and Bond Street.

Both County Hall and the Shire Hall in Bury St Edmunds had been inherited by Suffolk County Council from the two former county councils when local government was reorganised in 1974; Shire Hall served as an area office until 2009 when the council moved its Bury St Edmunds office to West Suffolk House, a new building shared with St Edmundsbury Borough Council (West Suffolk Council after 2019).

== Elections ==
Elections were held every four years from 1973 to 2026, with the 2026 election postponed from 2025 to allow for consideration of local government restructuring. Following boundary changes that came into effect at the 2026 election, the council comprises 70 councillors representing 69 electoral divisions, of which 68 each return a single member; the only two-member division is Beccles and Kessingland. Each councillor is responsible for their own Locality budget. For a full list of councillors elected at the 2026 election, see 2026 Suffolk County Council election.
