= Shire Hall Complex, Bury St Edmunds =

County building in Bury St Edmunds, Suffolk, England

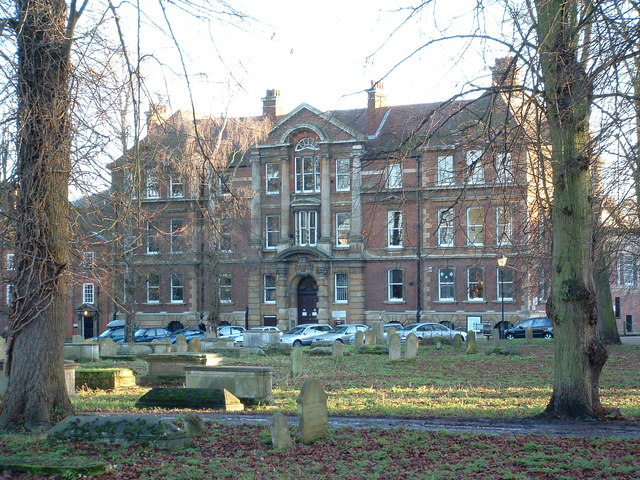
- The north frontage of the Old Shire Hall

- Location within Suffolk
- 52.2426°N 0.7195°E
- Location: Bury St Edmunds, Suffolk

History
- Built: 1750

Site notes
- Architect(s): William McIntosh Brookes (court house) and Archie Ainsworth-Hunt (old shire hall)
- Architectural styles: Greek Revival style (court house) and Edwardian Baroque style (old shire hall)

Listed Building – Grade II
- Official name: Old Shire Hall and Magistrates Court
- Designated: 8 November 2018
- Reference no.: 1460009

The Shire Hall Complex is a group of municipal buildings in Bury St Edmunds, Suffolk, England. The complex, which was the headquarters of West Suffolk County Council until its abolition in 1974, is a Grade II listed building.

== History ==
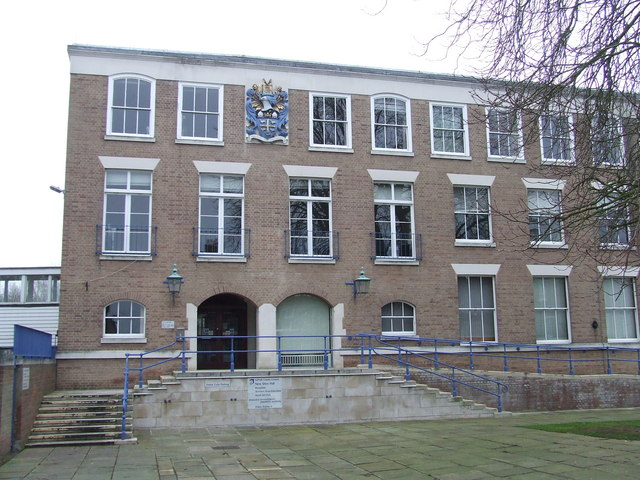
The New Shire Hall, subsequently converted into a Premier Inn Hotel

The complex lies within the original precincts of Bury St Edmunds Abbey and was originally the site of a monastic grammar school. The oldest part of the complex, the old court building, dates back to 1750: the two-storey building was remodeled in the early 19th century and was further restructured to the designs of William McIntosh Brookes in the Greek Revival style between 1841 and 1842. The building was originally used as the local facility for dispensing justice but, following the implementation of the Local Government Act 1888, which established county councils in every county, it also became the meeting place for West Suffolk County Council.

The building was extended to the north to the designs of Archie Ainsworth-Hunt, the county architect, in the Edwardian Baroque style so creating the "old shire hall" between 1906 and 1907. The design involved a symmetrical main frontage with eleven bays facing onto the churchyard with the end three bays on each side slightly projected forward; the central section of three bays featured an arched doorway on the ground floor flanked by Ionic order columns with a segmental pediment containing a cartouche; there was an oriel window on the first floor and a window with a fanlight on the second floor flanked by large Ionic order columns spanning the second and third floors; there was a pediment at roof level.

St Margaret's House, another 18th century building located to the east of the old shire hall, was acquired by the county council in 1932 and subsequently incorporated into the complex for use as additional county council offices. A large modern extension, designed by McMorran & Whitby and often referred to as the new shire hall, was added in 1968.

After West Suffolk County Council was abolished in 1974, the offices in the new shire hall accommodated the western area offices of certain of the departments of the Suffolk County Council. Later the new shire hall became surplus to requirements, but following conversion works, the building re-opened as a Premier Inn Hotel in October 2015. Meanwhile, the old shire hall ceased operating as a courthouse after the magistrates' court closed in October 2016. In February 2018 Homes England started preparing a planning brief with a view to marketing the old shire hall as a property with potential for conversion into apartments.
