= Edward Packard =

Edward Packard may refer to:

- Edward Packard (writer) (born 1931), American writer
- Edward Packard (businessman, born 1819) (1819–1899), English businessman who developed the coprolite fertiliser industry in Suffolk
- Edward Packard (businessman, born 1843) (1843–1932), his son who developed the business
