= Ipswich Fine Art Club Exhibition, 1880 =

The Ipswich Fine Art Club Exhibition, 1880 was an art exhibition organised by Ipswich Fine Art Club in Ipswich, Suffolk. It was opened on 13 March 1880. 705 paintings were exhibited and sales amounting to £870 were effected.

== Paintings Exhibited ==
Paintings by the following artists were exhibited:

- Robert Burrows
- John Duvall
- John Moore of Ipswich
- George Thomas Rope
- Isaac Sheppard
- Thomas Smythe
- Henry George Todd
