= Fisons =

British multinational company

Fisons plc
- Type: Public limited company
- Industry: Pharmaceuticals; Chemicals
- Founded: 1843; 183 years ago
- Defunct: 1995
- Fate: Acquired
- Successor: Rhone-Poulenc
- Headquarters: Ipswich, United Kingdom
- Key people: Paddy Linaker (Chairman); Stuart Wallis (CEO)

Fisons plc was a British multinational pharmaceutical, scientific instruments and agricultural chemicals company headquartered in Ipswich, United Kingdom. It was listed on the London Stock Exchange and was once a constituent of the FTSE 100 Index. It was acquired by Rhone-Poulenc in 1995.

== History ==
=== Foundation ===
The business was established by Edward Packard, one of the first to manufacture superphosphate derived from coprolites, in 1843. In 1863 he was joined in business by his son, also named Edward, who was instrumental in developing the business and rationalising the United Kingdom's fertiliser industry. The business was incorporated in 1895 under the name of Edward Packard and Company Limited.

In 1919 it bought a fertiliser business founded by James Fison of Thetford in 1808 and in 1929 the parent company's name was changed to Packard and James Fison (Thetford) Limited to reflect the acquisition. In 1929 the company acquired the fertiliser business of the Prentice Brothers, Stowmarket and the company was again renamed to Fison, Packard & Prentice, Limited.

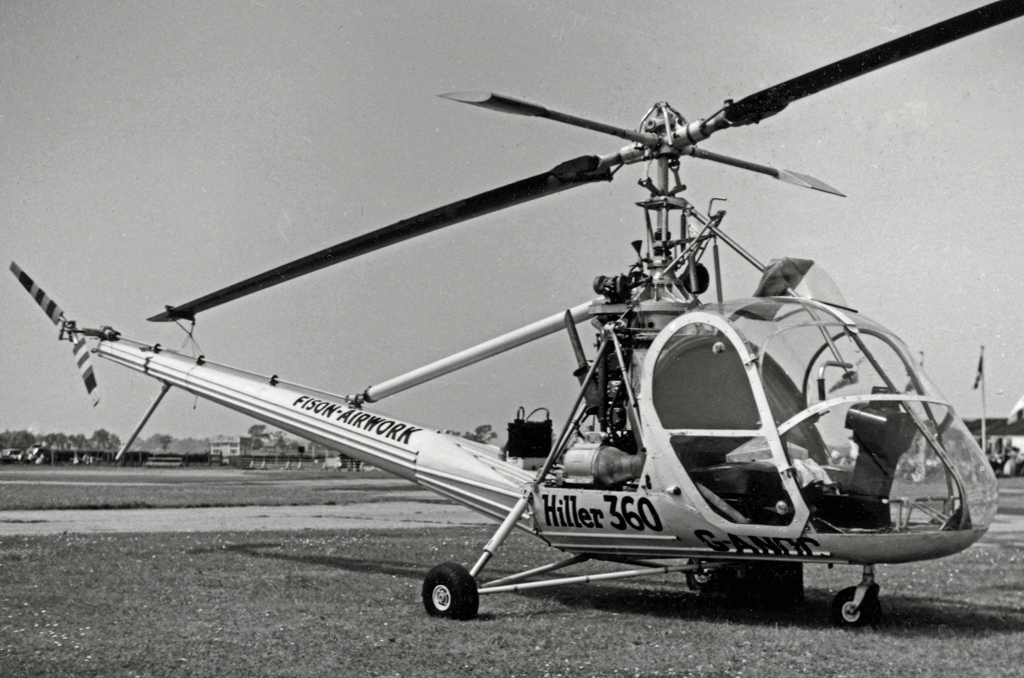
Hiller UH-12 helicopter used in 1955 by Fison-Airwork to demonstrate the use of aerial crop spraying

The Company formally changed its name to the shorter Fisons Ltd in 1942. During the 1950s, Fisons promoted the spraying of crops utilising helicopters.

Fisons owned parts of the Somerset Levels, where they extracted peat. In 1970 one of their staff, Ray Sweet, discovered the remains of a timber trackway. It has been dated to 3807 or 3806 BC, and is now known as the Sweet Track. A portion is now in the collection of the British Museum.

The company formed Nypro UK in December 1964, with Dutch State Mines. Fisons owned 24%.

=== Switch to pharmaceuticals ===
In the early 1980s the company decided to focus on pharmaceutical products and its fertiliser activities were sold to Norsk Hydro in 1982.

In the 1990s Fisons was targeted by the UK Earth Liberation Front, who caused nearly $100,000 in damage during a "night of action" in retaliation for Fisons' draining peat bogs in the English countryside.

Many years of successful growth were financed by sales of sodium cromoglycate in a variety of formulations used to treat asthma and allergies of the eye among several disease areas. However, the loss of lucrative product licences for Opticrom and Imferon in the US in 1991 and the failure of clinical trials for Tipredane, an asthma drug, in 1993 revealed bleak prospects for the business.

In early 1995 the Instruments Division was sold to US Thermo Instrument Systems while the Research and Development facilities in Loughborough and Rochester, New York, with their pipelines were acquired by the Swedish company Astra AB.

=== Acquisition ===
In late 1995 Fisons was acquired by the United States–based Rhone-Poulenc Rorer, Inc., which in turn was wholly owned by France's chemical giant Rhône-Poulenc S.A.

== Operations ==
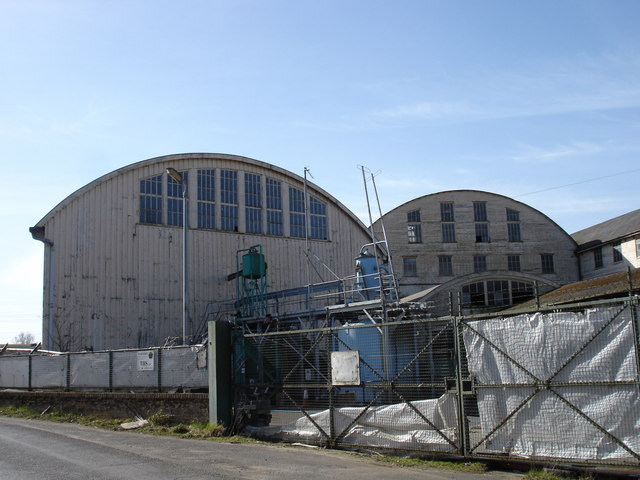
Fisons' former fertiliser factory in Ipswich in 2009, ten years before its destruction by fire

The company was based in Ipswich with Pharmaceutical Research and Development in Loughborough, United Kingdom, and Rochester, New York, US, and manufacturing in Holmes Chapel, Cheshire. The company's fertiliser factory in Ipswich, built in 1858, was Grade II listed; it was destroyed in a fire, suspected to be caused by arson, in 2019.

== Sponsorship ==
Fisons were sponsors of Ipswich Town Football Club from the 1986–87 season through to the 1994–95 season, including the 1991–92 season when they won the Second Division championship and gained promotion to the new Premier League.

== See also ==
- Superphosphate
- Coprolites, an early source of phosphate found in south Suffolk
- Coprolite Street
- Pharmaceutical industry in the United Kingdom
