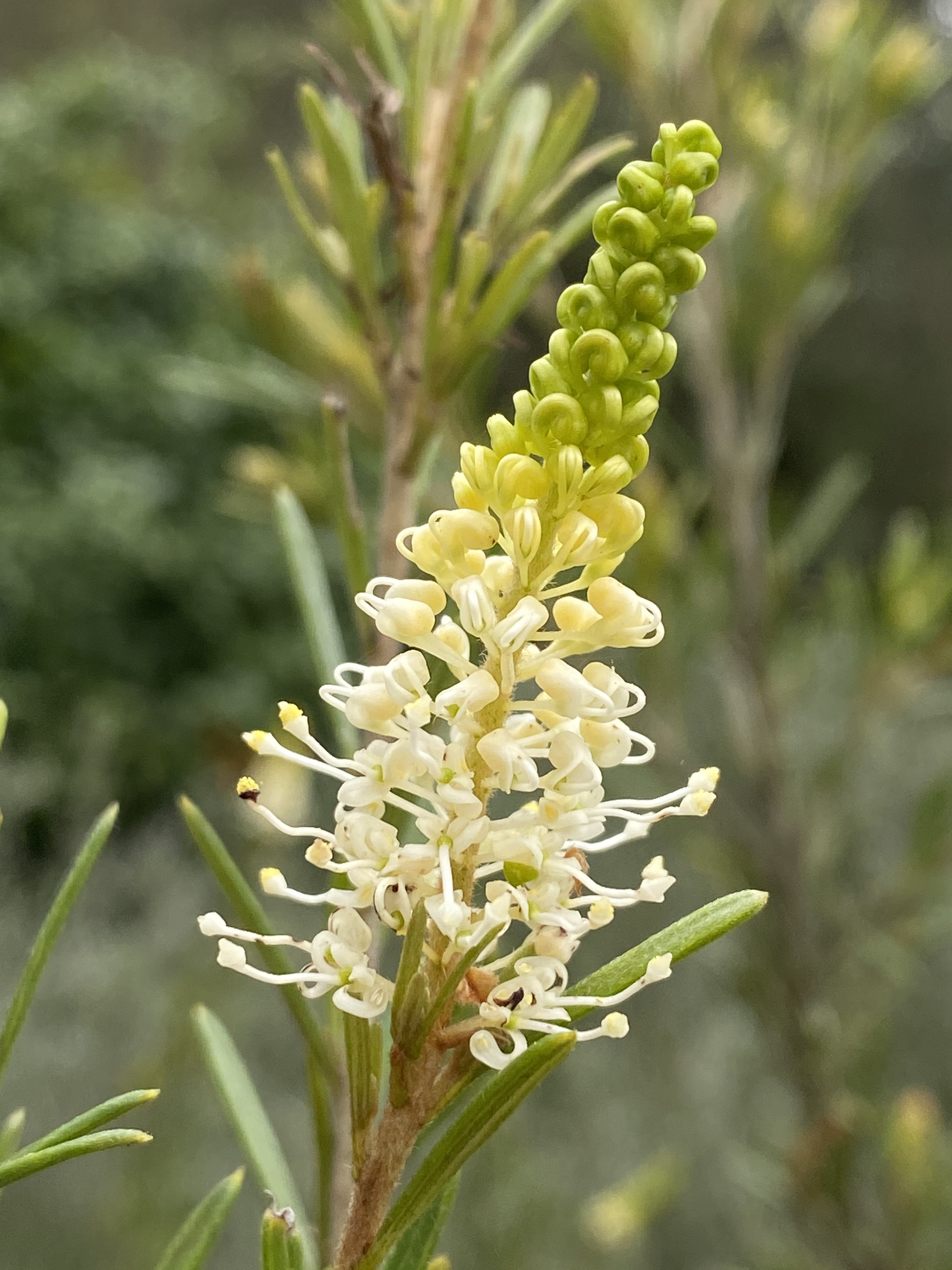

Scientific classification
- Kingdom: Plantae
- Clade: Tracheophytes
- Clade: Angiosperms
- Clade: Eudicots
- Order: Proteales
- Family: Proteaceae
- Genus: Grevillea
- Species: G. trachytheca

Binomial name
- Grevillea trachytheca F.Muell.

= Grevillea trachytheca =

Species of shrub endemic to Western Australia

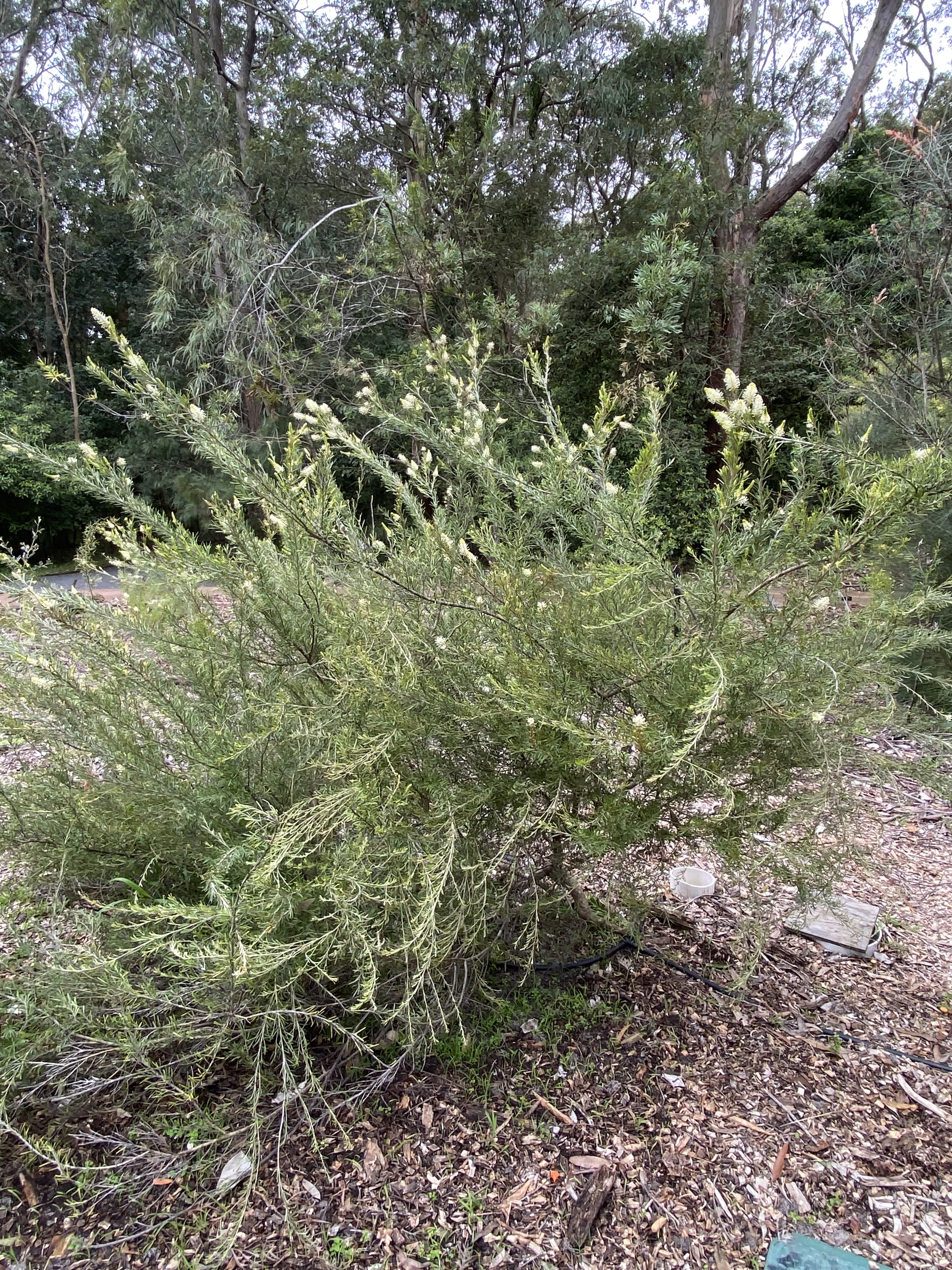
Habit of a cultivated specimen in Leeton

Grevillea trachytheca, commonly known as rough-fruit grevillea, is a species of flowering plant in the family Proteaceae and is endemic to the south-west of Western Australia. It is an erect to spreading shrub with hairy branchlets, mostly broadly linear leaves, and white to cream-coloured and yellow flowers with a white style.

== Description ==
Grevillea trachytheca is an erect to spreading shrub that typically grows to a height of 0.6–2 m (2 ft 0 in – 6 ft 7 in) and has woolly- to velvety-hairy branchlets. Its leaves are mostly broadly linear, 15–35 mm (0.59–1.38 in) long and 1–2 mm (0.039–0.079 in) wide. The edges of the leaves are rolled under, enclosing most of the lower surface apart from the mid-vein. The flowers are arranged in narrowly conical to more or less cylindrical clusters along a shaggy-hairy rachis 20–60 mm (0.79–2.36 in) long, the flowers at the lower part of the rachis flowering first. The flowers are white to cream-coloured and yellow with a white style, the pistil 5.5–7.0 mm (0.22–0.28 in) long. Flowering occurs from May to October and the fruit is a rough, oval to elliptic follicle 11–14 mm (0.43–0.55 in) long.

This grevillea is closely related to G. crithmifolia, which has shorter flower clusters and divided leaves.

== Taxonomy ==
Grevillea trachytheca was first formally described in 1868 by Ferdinand von Mueller in Fragmenta phytographiae Australiae from specimens growing in sand near the Murchison River collected by Augustus Oldfield. The specific epithet (trachytheca) means "rough cover" or "rough container", referring to the fruit.

== Distribution and habitat ==
Rough-fruit grevillea grows in shrubland near Kalbarri and along the lower Murchison River in the Carnarvon and Geraldton Sandplains bioregions of south-western Western Australia.

== Use in horticulture ==
Grevillea trachytheca is a suitable plant for use in areas with a Mediterranean climate, where it can be used as a dense hedge or screen. Most well-drained soils in a sunny or partially-shaded location are recommended. It is most easily propagated from cuttings.

== See also ==
- List of Grevillea species
