= Duke Street =

Duke Street may refer to:

== Places ==
=== United Kingdom ===
- Duke Street, Barrow-in-Furness, a road through the centre and Hindpool area of Barrow-in-Furness
- Duke Street, Devonport (Plymouth), named after HMS Duke launched in 1777 from Devonport Dockyard
- Duke Street, in the Park Hill area of Sheffield
- Duke Street, Windle, St Helens
- Duke Street, Liverpool
- Duke Street, Ipswich, Suffolk
- Duke Street, Glasgow
- Duke Street Prison, a prison in Glasgow
- Duke Street railway station, a railway station in Glasgow
- Duke Street, Bath, in Bath, Somerset, England
- Duke Street, Edinburgh

=== London ===
- Duke Street, Clerkenwell, WC1, connected to Vere Street and, via Prince's Street, to Drury Lane
- Duke Street, Westminster, WC2, originally connecting George Street, Villiers Street, Buckingham Street and Of Alley (named for George Villiers, 2nd Duke of Buckingham), but now replaced by John Adam Street
- Duke Street, Marylebone, W1
- The Duchess of Duke Street, a BBC TV drama
- Duke Street, St James's, SW1, connecting Piccadilly and Pall Mall across Jermyn Street
- Duke Street, Richmond, TW9
- Duke Street Baptist Church, a church in London
- Duke Street, Sutton, SM1

=== Elsewhere ===
- Duke Street, Kangaroo Point, Brisbane, Australia
- Duke Street, Dublin, Ireland
- Duke Street, Kingston, Jamaica
- Duke Street, Norfolk, Virginia, United States
- Duke Street, Singapore
- Virginia State Route 236, which is named Duke Street in Alexandria, Virginia
- Duke Street was planned in 1793 as an east -west road in York, Upper Canada but was renamed as King Street in 1797. The name was reused for another road after 1797, from New Street (now Jarvis Street) to Berkeley Street, but was renamed as Adelaide Street in 1965.

== Companies ==
- Duke Street Capital, a European private equity firm
- Duke Street Records, a Canadian record label
