= Roger Devereux of Norfolk =

Anglo-Norman nobleman

Roger Devereux was a Norman nobleman who, following the Norman Conquest of 1066, was recorded as holding lands in Norfolk at the time of the Domesday survey of 1086.

== Family name and landholdings ==
=== Origin of the name Devereux ===
Devereux was a follower of William d'Ecouis, a tenant-in-chief who took his name from the village of Écouis in Normandy, near the towns of Évreux and Rouen, which were the main holdings of the Count of Évreux. The name of a landholder in England under a tenant-in-chief often reflected the area of Normandy from which he originated, and Devereux's name therefore suggests that his family's origins were in the Évreux region.

=== Landholdings in 1086 ===
According to the Domesday Book of 1086, Devereux held lands valued at about £4 under William d'Ecouis in Buckenham, Great Bircham, Holme-next-the-Sea, Ringstead and Tasburgh.

== Descendants ==
On 25 September 1188 a Bartholomew Devereux and his father were listed on the charter of John, Bishop of Norwich, confirming grants to Dodnash Priory in Suffolk at its foundation. (Note: Part of the Norfolk lands passed to Roger Picot who later granted them in 1196 to Deodate, Prior of St. Faith at Horsham, and the convent there.)

Around 1214 the Bigod family transferred two fees of Forcnet manor to Bartholomew Devereux, who was stylized as Lord of Hardwick. The Devereux family also held Starston Hall manor in Earsham hundred. Bartholomew was followed by another Roger Devereux; and later Ralf Devereux and his wife Dionise held the manor in 1308. The Starston Hall manor was still in the Devereux family as late as 1309, when Bartholomew de Ebroicis granted a messuage, land and rent in Sturston, Norfolk, to Geoffrey de Stokes, Geoffrey de Cesterton and the latter's heirs.
