= John Duvall =

John Duvall may refer to:

- John L. Duvall (1874–1962), mayor of Indianapolis
- John Duvall (artist) (1816–1892), English artist
