= Leonard Turner =

Engineer based in Ipswich, Suffolk, UK

Leonard Turner (13 October 1859 Ipswich – 21 August 1944, Ipswich) was an engineer in Ipswich, Suffolk. He was the founding president of the Ipswich Engineering Society in 1899. He also was active as a watercolour painter exhibiting with the Ipswich Fine Art Club.
