= Dodnash Priory =

English priory

Coordinates: 51.979696°N 1.063428°E

Dodnash Priory was a small Augustinian priory located in Bentley, Suffolk, England, near the village's boundary with East Bergholt. It was situated close to Dodnash brook, which flows into the River Stour.

== History ==
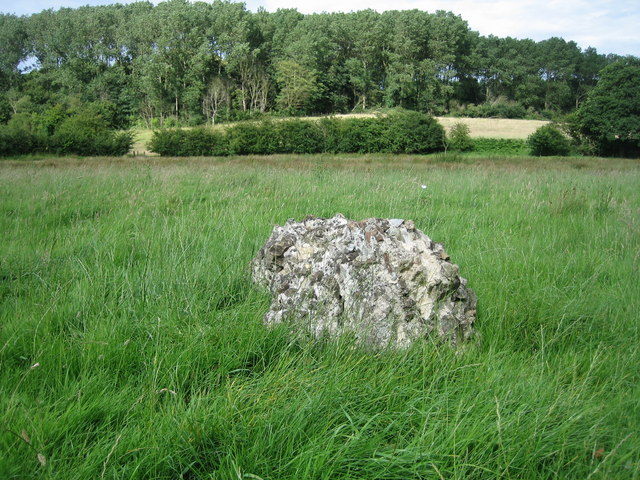
These stones are the only surviving ruins of Dodnash Priory.

=== Foundation ===
Although details of the priory's foundation are scant, its charters show that it was established in about 1188 by Wimer the Chaplain, sheriff of Norfolk and Suffolk and a prominent servant of Henry II, on land granted by the Tosny family.

=== Priory life ===
The religious life of Dodnash Priory and the secular life of the surrounding area are recorded in its charters, which are thought to contain the first known references to Flatford Mill. The priory initially held lands in Bentley, East Bergholt and Chelmondiston and in 1327 its prior was granted free warren over lands in Bentley, East Bergholt and Falkenham. Other property and rents were later acquired in mortmain, and by 1485 the priory's endowment included rents and lands in 15 Suffolk parish, as well as the tithe of barley in Falkenham.

The priory was home to a small number of canons (four are recorded as living there in 1381) of the Order of Saint Augustine.

=== Dissolution ===
Dodnash Priory was dissolved in 1525 by Cardinal Wolsey and its endowment used to found colleges in Ipswich and Oxford. At the time, it was home to just three canons and was considered too small to be viable. It was surrendered on 1 February 1525 by its last prior, Thomas, in the presence of Thomas Cromwell and other members of Wolsey's commission.

The priory and its lands were later assigned to the Tollemache family.

== The priory today ==
Archaeological evidence of the priory has all but disappeared, save for a pile of re-used mediaeval stone in a field that can be accessed via a public footpath. The name also survives in the name of Dodnash Priory Farm.

== List of priors ==
Priors of Dodnash included:

- John de Goddesford, resigned 1346
- Adam Newman, elected 1346
- Henry de Benacre, elected 19 June 1349
- Thomas de Thornham, resigned 1383
- John Capel, elected 1406
- Robert Newbone, resigned 1438
- Michel de Colchester, elected 1438
- Richard Whytyng, elected 1444
- Thomas, resigned 1525
