= Ipswich Racecourse =

Historic horse racing venue in Ipswich, England

Coordinates: 52.04223°N 1.18759°E

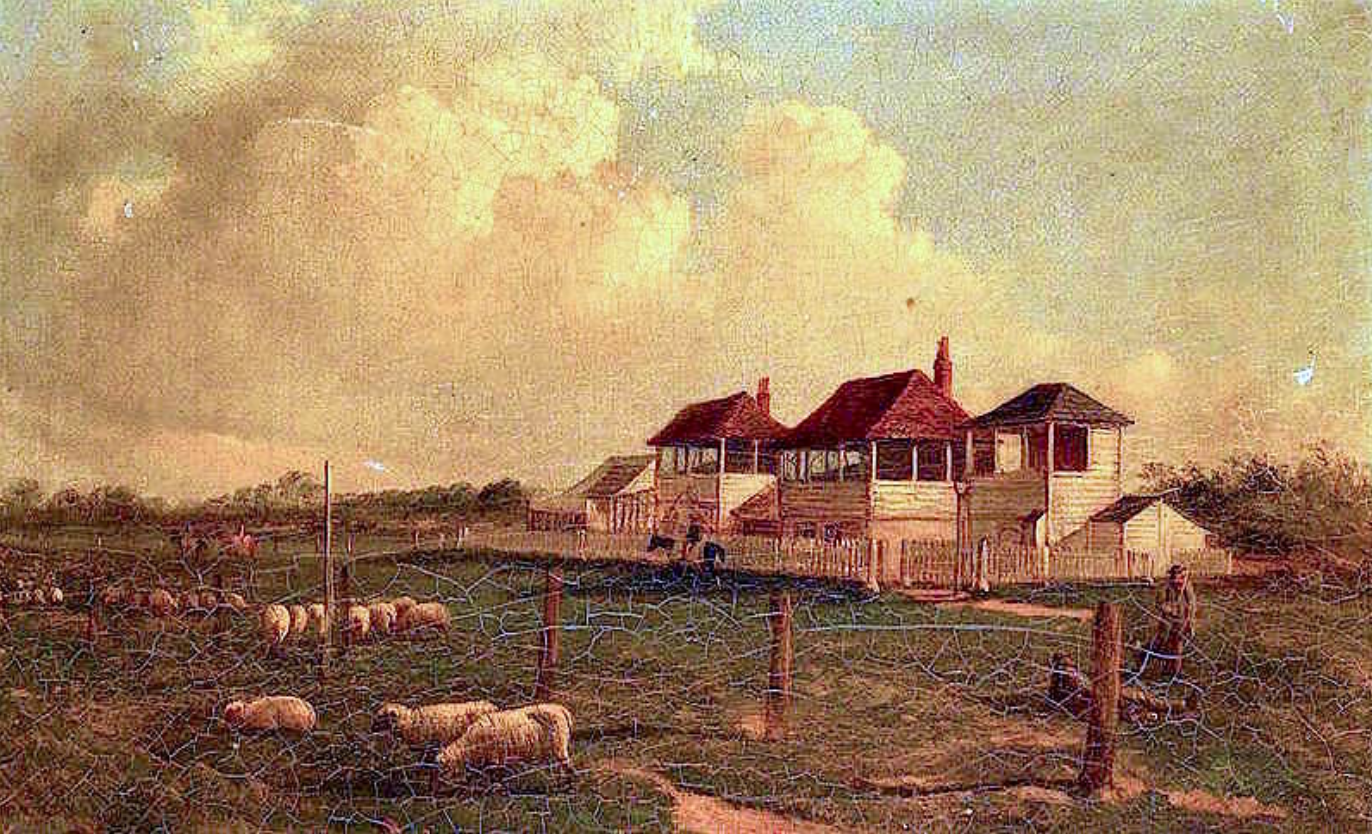
Ipswich Racecourse, Suffolk by John Duvall (1815-1892)

The Ipswich Racecourse is an area of Ipswich in Suffolk, England, that was formerly a racecourse from 1710 to 1911.

== The racecourse 1710–1911 ==
The course was on what was part of the then Nacton Heath which at the time was just east of Ipswich, now in Priory Heath Ward, Ipswich. It was 1 mile and 7 furlongs in circumference and ran along the line of the modern Lindberg Road, Cobham Road, parallel to Felixstowe Road as far the modern Hatfield Road before a six furlong finish straight running parallel to Nacton Road to complete the loop.

The earliest mention of annual race meetings in Ipswich was 1710 when a Town Purse was run for by "high mettled racers".

A Royal Plate provided as a prize from 1727 which gave the meetings good support for the next half a century, with the Ipswich Journal running an advertisement for:

"A new stand on the race ground. Having been requested by several Gentlemen to erect a covered stand for the accommodation of gentleman attending the races, the public are hereby respectfully informed that a complete and elegant stand is now finished, with an inscription against it in golden letters, "The Gentleman's Stand" where gentlemen may have places at two shillings and sixpence each.

Pitt's Farm – on the nearby subsequent site of Holywells House, in Holywells Park – was also known as Raceground Farm.

Popularity declined slightly until the garrison came to Ipswich in the early 19th century where the officers brought their support to the races.

The course ran a mix of flat and hunt racing, although the last flat race was in 1884 following the withdrawal of the Queen's Plate. From then, it became exclusively a National Hunt course.

The hurdles were unpopular with jockeys and horses alike which, although built to National Hunt rules, lacked wings, which increased the risk of the horses running out unless the jockey approached the centre of the hurdle.

The last race meeting was 29 March 1911 after support had fallen steadily.

== Contemporary site ==
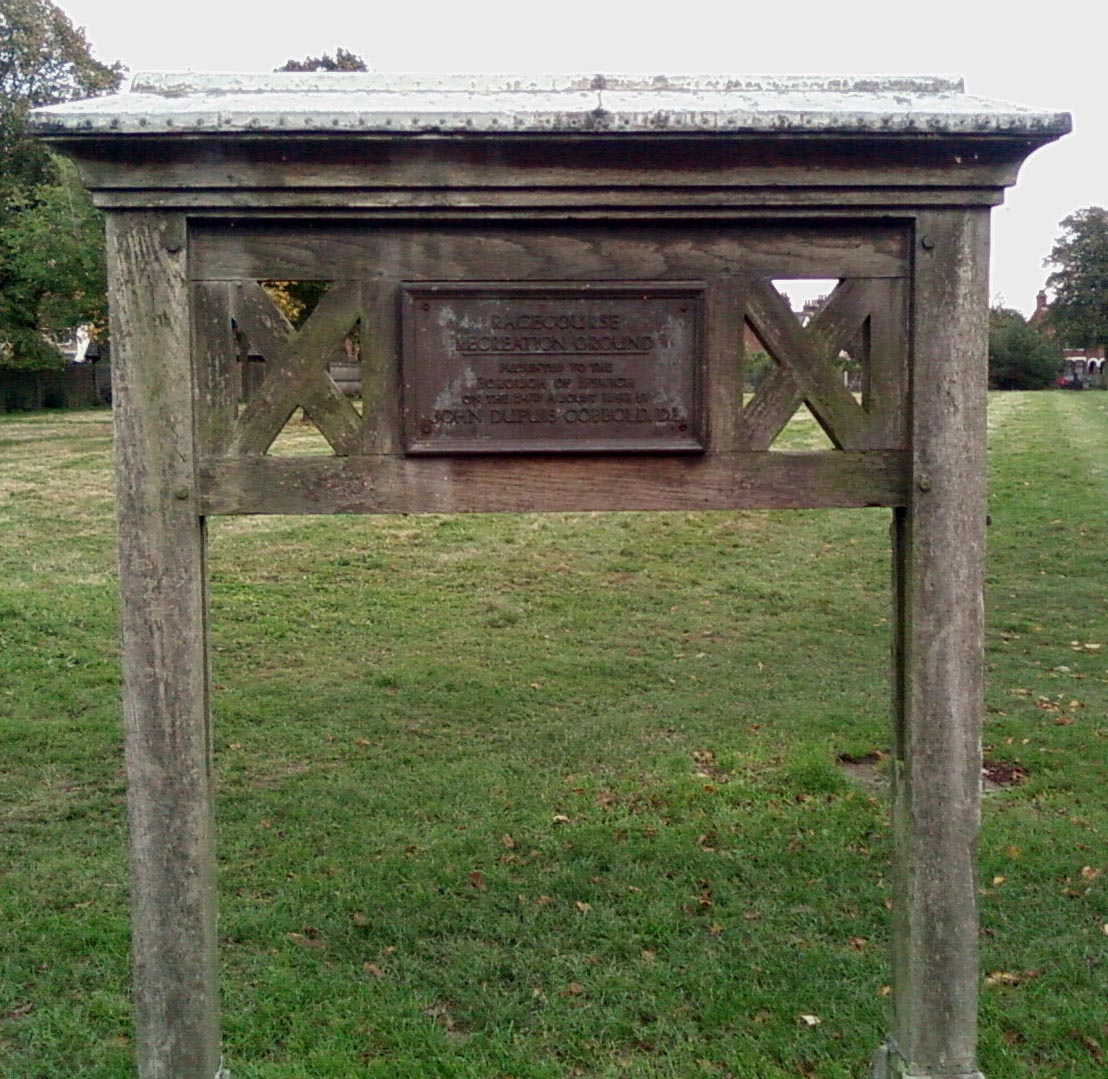
"Racecourse Recreation Ground presented to the Borough of Ipswich on 24 August 1897, by John Dupuis Cobbold, D.L."

The area is now part of a large 1930s housing estate. The Racecourse Recreation Ground comprises a sports area, children's play area and public toilets.

The Racecourse Pub (on Nacton Road) reputedly stood on the site of the finishing line. In 2009 the Racecourse went bankrupt and was demolished later in the year. A Tesco Express and five homes now occupy the site, which was completed in early 2010.
