= Thomas Smythe (artist) =

British landscape artist

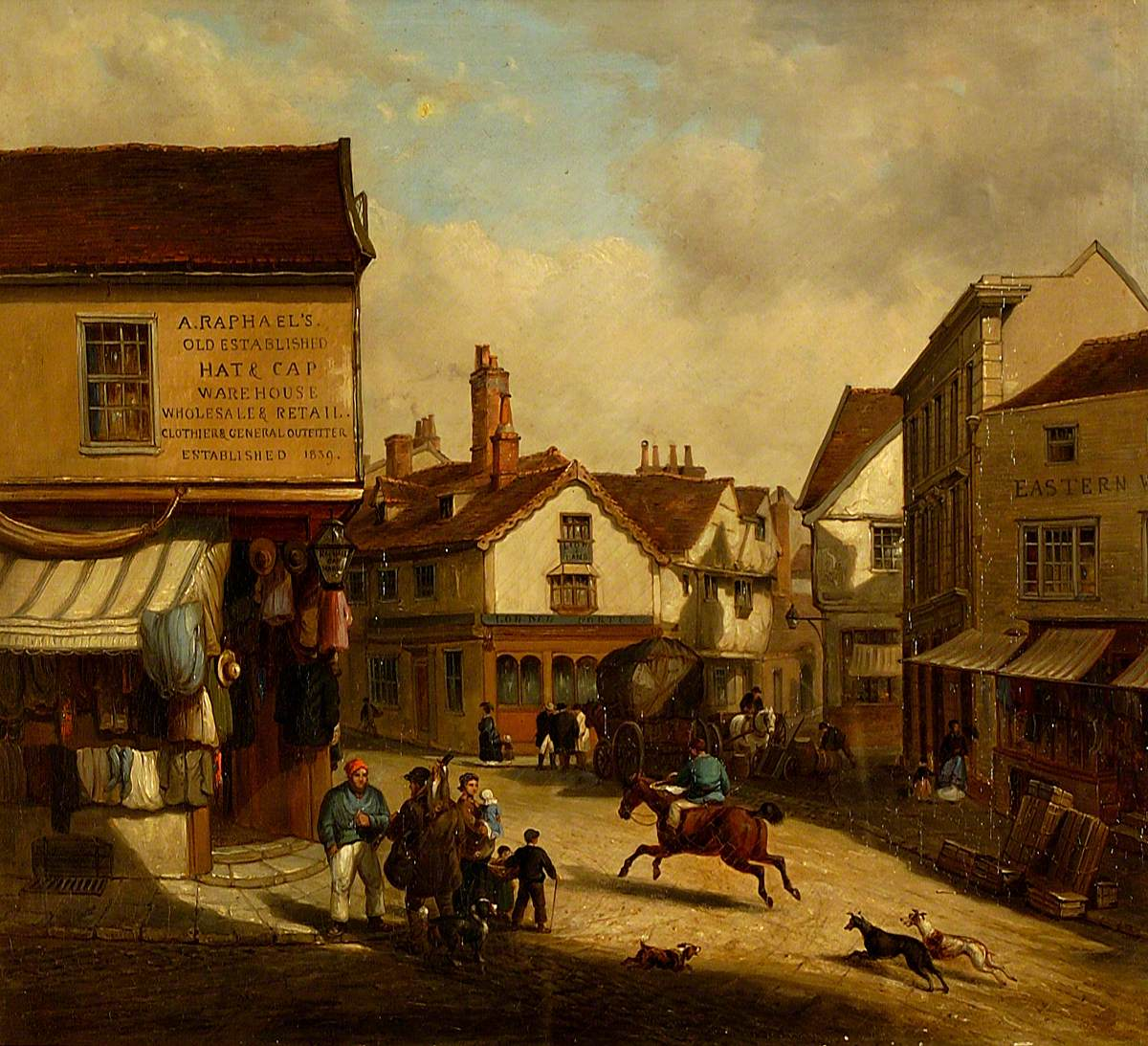
Angel Corner, Fore Street, c. 1850)

Thomas Smythe (9 April 1825, Ipswich – 15 May 1906, Ipswich) was a British landscape artist who painted bucolic scenes and animals. He exhibited seventeen paintings with the Society of British Artists and was an active member of the Ipswich Fine Art Club from 1878 to 1903.

== Early life ==
He was born the son of James Smyth (1780-1863) and his wife Sarah Harriet (née Skitter). He was brought up in Berners Street, Ipswich with his brother, Edward Robert Smythe (1810-1899), also an artist.
