= Edward Packard (businessman, born 1843) =

English businessman (1843–1932)

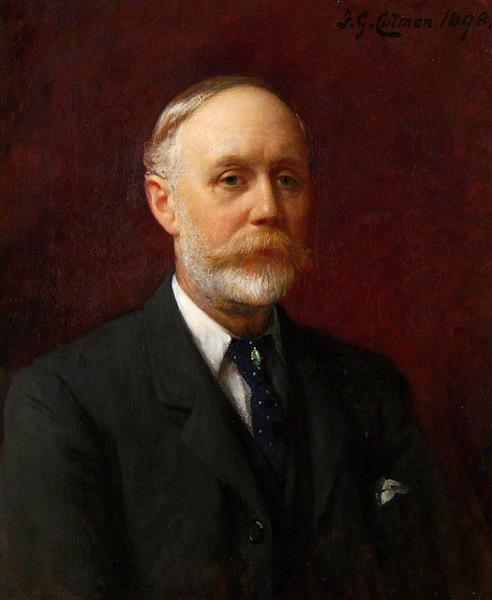
Edward Packard (1889) by Frederick George Cotman

Sir Edward Packard, junior (28 September, 1843, Saxmundham – 1932 Bramford), was an English businessman who developed a major artificial fertilizer industry near Ipswich, Suffolk. He also was active in the formation and development of the Ipswich Art Club, also contributing a number of his paintings to various exhibitions.

== Early life ==
Edward Packard was born in 1843 at Saxmundham in Suffolk, the son of Edward Packard senior and his first wife Mary Woods. He was educated at Bury St Edmunds Grammar School, followed by King's College, London and the Royal Agricultural College at Cirencester. He embarked on the grand tour with his brother Henry Wood Packard. On his return they joined their father's business in Bramford in 1866. Edward was a qualified chemist.

== Business career ==
In 1872 when the Packards patented a new type of highly concentrated superphosphate, the works covered four acres of land with a surrounding village of houses for employees, and 800 tons of superphosphates and other manures were being produced every week. He stated before the Ipswich Dock Commissioners that of 882 vessels clearing outwards of the Port of Ipswich in 1871, 425 were loaded by this firm. He was influential in attempts to rationalize the fertiliser industry in the 1880s, and in attempts to impose higher quality standards. In 1919 he oversaw negotiations leading to the merger of his business with James Fison (Thetford) Ltd ultimately leading to the formation of Packard and James Fison (Thetford) Ltd ('Fisons') of which he became Chairman.

== Cultural activities ==
He was an active member of Dr. John Taylor's Ipswich Science-Gossip Society from the late 1860s. He received, accompanied and led the Society's inspection of the works in 1872. An enthusiast for fine art, Packard played a major role in founding the Ipswich Fine Art Club in 1874. In time became Chairman of the Ipswich School of Arts. He maintained and continued his father's strong interest in and support for the Ipswich Museum, and served as Chairman of its Committee from 1894 to 1926.

He was active in negotiating arrangements for Nina Layard to conduct extensive excavations and to have curatorship of her collections at Christchurch Mansion in 1906-07, under very trying circumstances.

== Family life ==
In 1867 Packard married Ellen Turner, the daughter of Walton Turner. They set up home in Grove House, Bramford where Edward lived for the rest of his life. The couple had twelve children. Their daughter, Edith Celia (later Mrs Alfred Farrar) was born in 1871, and lived until 1962.

== Public positions ==
He served as High Steward of Ipswich, 1916-1932; Chairman of the Harwich Harbour Board; President of the Suffolk Chamber of Agriculture; Chairman of the Ipswich Museum & Free Library Committee, and Chairman of the Ipswich School of Arts. He was knighted in 1922 and died at his home in Bramford in 1932.
