= Kirton, Suffolk =

Village in Suffolk, England

Coordinates: 52.011°N 1.320°E

Kirton
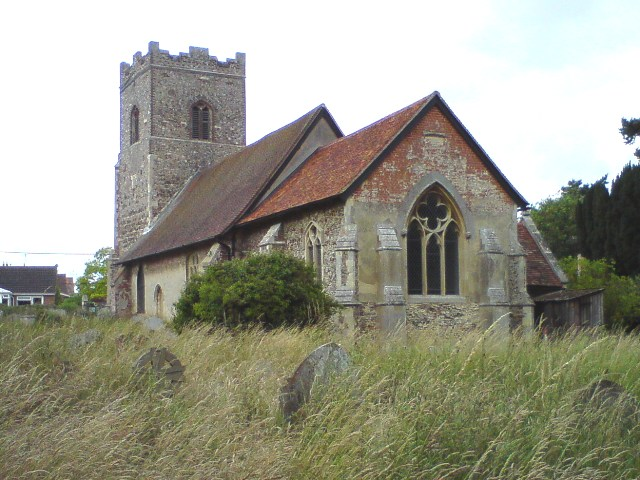
- St Mary and St Martin Church, Kirton

- Location within Suffolk
- Area: 8.3 km^{2} (3.2 sq mi)
- Population: 1,146 (2011 Census)
  - Density: 138/km^{2} (360/sq mi)
- OS grid reference: TM2781139981
- Civil parish: Kirton
- District: East Suffolk
- Shire county: Suffolk
- Region: East
- Country: England
- Sovereign state: United Kingdom
- Post town: Ipswich
- Postcode district: IP10
- Dialling code: 01394
- UK Parliament: Suffolk Coastal

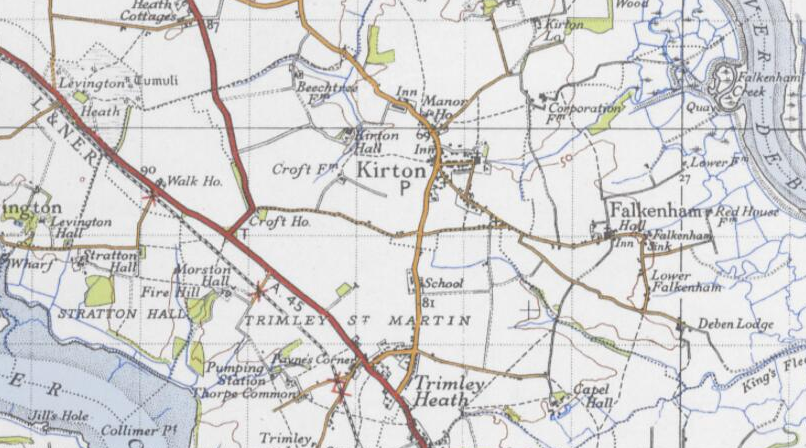
Map of Kirton, Suffolk as shown by a 1945 Ordnance Survey Map

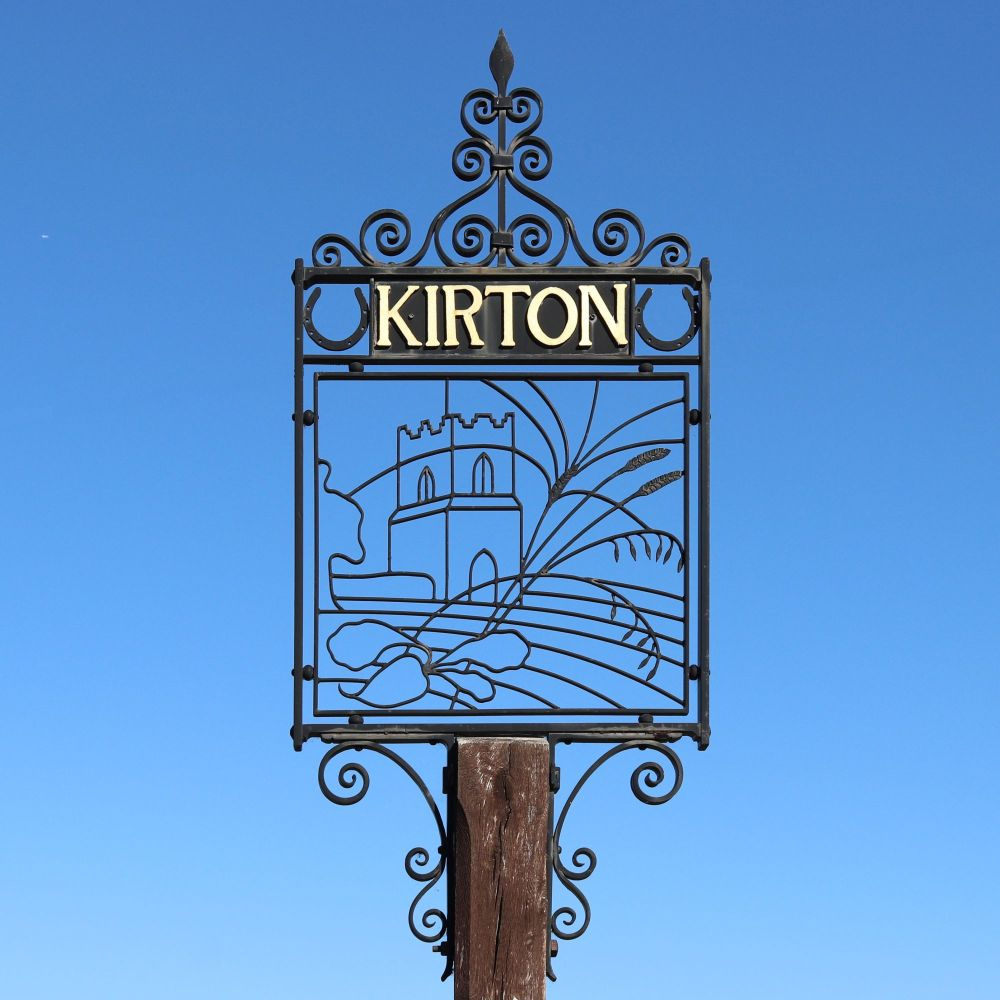
Kirton Village Sign

Kirton is a village and civil parish in the East Suffolk district, in the county of Suffolk, England, situated off the A14 road, about 4.5 km (2.8 mi) from Felixstowe and around 10 km (6.2 mi) from Ipswich. The closest train station to Kirton is Trimley. According to the 2011 census, Kirton had a population of 1,146. It is located between the River Deben and the River Orwell. The village of Kirton covers a total area of 8.3 km^{2} (3.2 sq mi). As the county of Suffolk lacks quarries, many of the buildings are made from flint, clay and timber.

Kirton and Falkenham share the Parish Council, the school, the Village Hall, and most of the organisations. Kirton has a church and it also has access to a primary school.

== History ==
In the 1870s, John Marius Wilson's Imperial Gazetteer of England and Wales described Kirton as:

"a village and a parish in Woodbridge district, Suffolk. The church is early English, in rubble, with a stone tower and a new aisle; and contains a very ancient piscina. There are a Wesleyan chapel and 3½ acres of poors' land. Clara Reeve, who wrote The Old English Baron, was a native."

There were two manors in Kirton during the late 1860s, with Miss Cartwright being the lady of one and the Duke of Hamilton being the lord of the other.

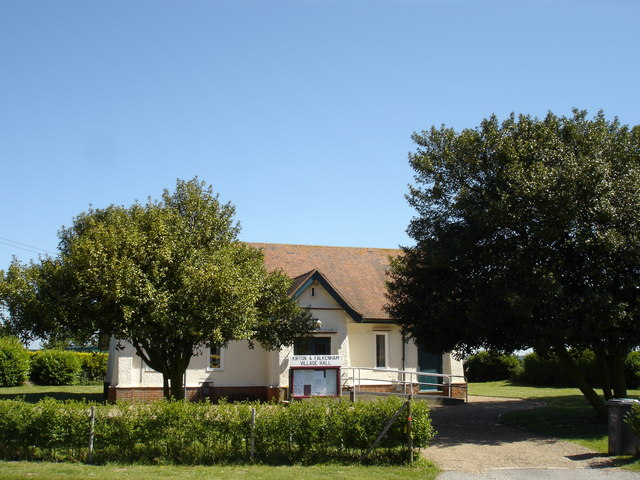
Kirton and Falkenham village hall is where most of the Parish Council meetings are held.

In the late 19th century, Kirton was a centre for coprolite winning. Coprolites were dug out of shallow pits and conveyed by light-weight tramways before shipping to nearby Ipswich where they were processed by Mr Edward Packard into superphosphate fertilizer.

=== Name ===
The name Kirton comes from the Anglo-Saxon name of Kirkatuna, meaning "church town". Kirton is mentioned in the Domesday Book three times. Kirton is mentioned as having a church as well as a priest of its own. During 1066, Godric was the priest of Kirton, he was also affiliated with another town in Suffolk. Kirton is often associated with its early connection to Christianity, as it is believed that the Romans settled in and around areas of Kirton and Falkenham.

=== Parish Council ===
Kirton shares its Parish with Falkenham. The Parish meets at least once a month and consists of 16 members. Over half of the council members represent Kirton. The Parish offers help on transport, council spending and social issues, it also provides information on organisations that operate in the area. There are several organisations set up in Kirton which help bring the community together as well as promoting a sense unity. There are over 15 organisations including well known children's organisations like cubs and scouts. The youth club also operates in Kirton in addition to the Baden-Powell organisations. The wide range of organisations which operate in the Parish offer opportunities to all the different age groups, activities range from gardening to fitness.

== Demographics ==
=== Population ===
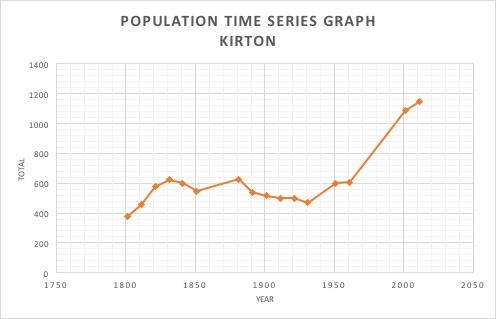
Total Population of Kirton Civil Parish, Suffolk, as reported by the Census of Population from 1801–2011.

The population of Kirton over that past two centuries has seen gradual changes. For the first century, the population of Kirton fluctuated between 376 and 627. During 1801, the population of Kirton was 376, the lowest it has ever been to this date. The population of Kirton slowly began to fall in 1881. It fell until 1931, from 627 to 469. Towards the end of World War II, the population began to grow at a rapid rate again as the risk of death had decreased. During 1961 to 2011, the population of Kirton grew rapidly by almost double, from 605 to 1,146. Over the past 200 years the population of Kirton has tripled from 376 to 1,146.

=== Employment ===
Many of the male workers, during 1881, were involved in agricultural activity. This was the most common work sector during this period as many households relied on farm grown products and produce. In contrast, many of the female workers, during 1881, were without specific occupations or their occupation was unknown. However, a greater number of woman during this time period where involved in domestic labour; in Kirton, 21 women were domestic servants for wealthier families. It was very common during this period of time that women worked as servants in wealthier households as it was a simple way for working class women to earn a living. The 2001 census showed that 65% of the population aged 16–74 (530 people) were employed, this includes part-time workers, full-time workers and self-employed workers. However, the 2011 census showed that 63% of the population aged 16–74 were employed.

Female employment type in Kirton, Suffolk 1881

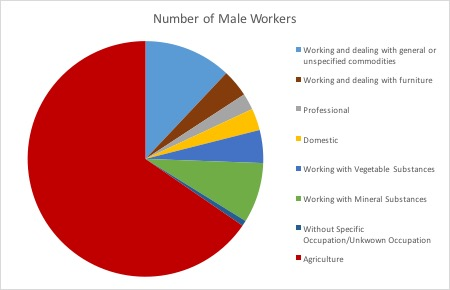
Male employment type in Kirton, Suffolk 1881

=== Ethnicity ===
Information published by the 2011 census shows that the largest ethnic group in Kirton is White British. The census report shows that 96% (1,102 out of the total 1,146) of the total population in Kirton are of this ethnicity. The other 4% of people are either Other White ethnicity or are part of multiple ethnic groups. When comparing the 2011 ethnic structure with the 2001 ethnic structure the data shows that 97% of the total population in Kirton were of white ethnicity. Over the 10 years the ethnic structure of Kirton has not changed greatly.

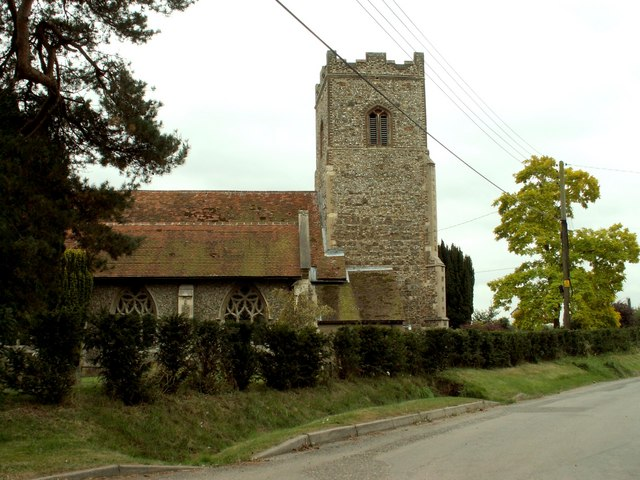
An image of St Mary and St Martin Church from the street

=== Age structure ===
Information that was published in the 2011 census indicated that 25.5% of the population were aged between 45–59, with the second largest age group being 30–44 (16.2%). The 2011 census data showed that over 67% of people who live in Kirton were aged 30 and above. The data also showed that of the remaining 33%, the largest age group was 10–14. This age group made up 21% of the total 33%.

== St Mary and St Martin church ==
St Mary and St Martin church dates back to the 14th century. The only aspects of the church that help date it back to the early 14th century are the font, the doorway and the piscina, as the rest were either hidden by rebuildings of the church, or damaged during the process. The church has regular Sunday services, Bible study groups and prayer groups. The church hall is also available to hire for events such as quiz nights, karaoke, children's parties and private functions. St Mary and St Martin church is often maintained by a local group called 'The Friends of Kirton Church'. This group was set up in 2000 and has since helped raise funds of up to £30,000 for major renovations of the church grounds.
