= Duke Street, Ipswich =

Street in Ipswich, Suffolk, England

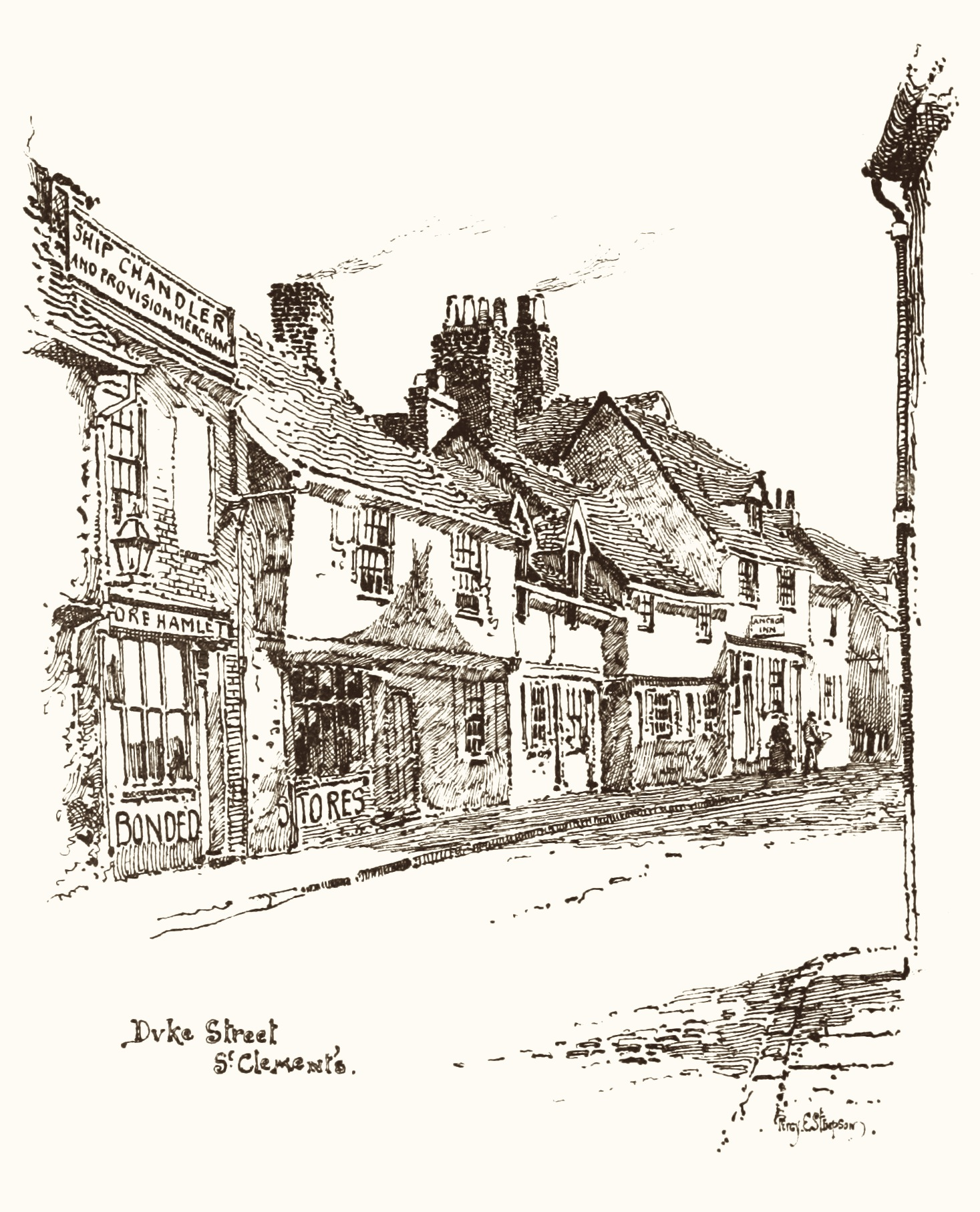
Duke Street (1888) by Percy Stimpson

Duke Street is a street in Ipswich, Suffolk, England, which played an important part in the industrial development of Ipswich. Originally, it was quite short, however, as its modern southern portion was known as St John's Street. Coprolite Street connects it the quay at Neptune Marina, part of Ipswich Waterfront.

== History ==
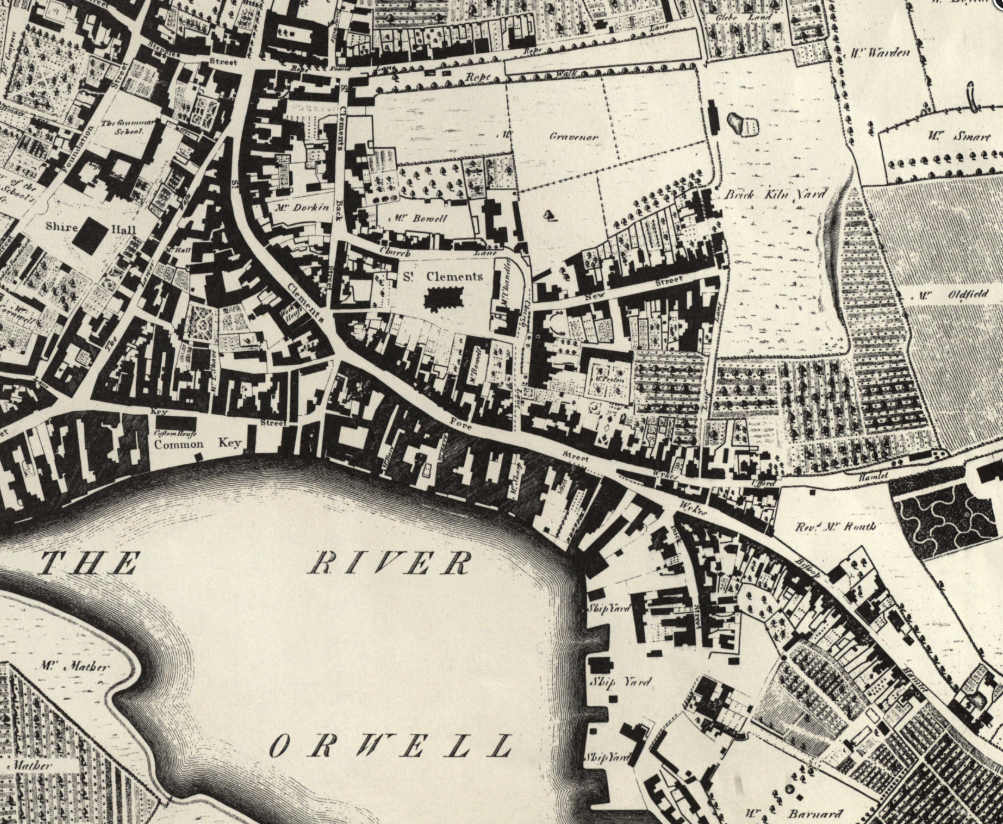
Joseph Pennington's map, 1778

Duke Street gave access to one of the principal ship building areas of Ipswich in St Clements Parish.

Duke street is shown in Joseph Pennington's map of 1778. This map shows a number of shipyards on the eastern bank of the Orwell between Duke Street and the river.

By the mid nineteenth century the entrance to both the Orwell Works and White City Works sites of Ransomes, Sims & Jefferies were on Duke Street, as well as their garage which housed the electric vehicles.

== Ethnic Group ==
Duke Street, Ipswich can be considered more ethnically diverse than the UK average. As whole, the UK population claims itself as approximately 83% white, with residents of this area being 69% so.

As a country with a diverse population, the UK is home to other sizable ethnic groups, with mixed ethnicity (2.7%), Indian (2.9%) and Pakistani (2.6%) being the largest groups reported.

== Notable buildings ==
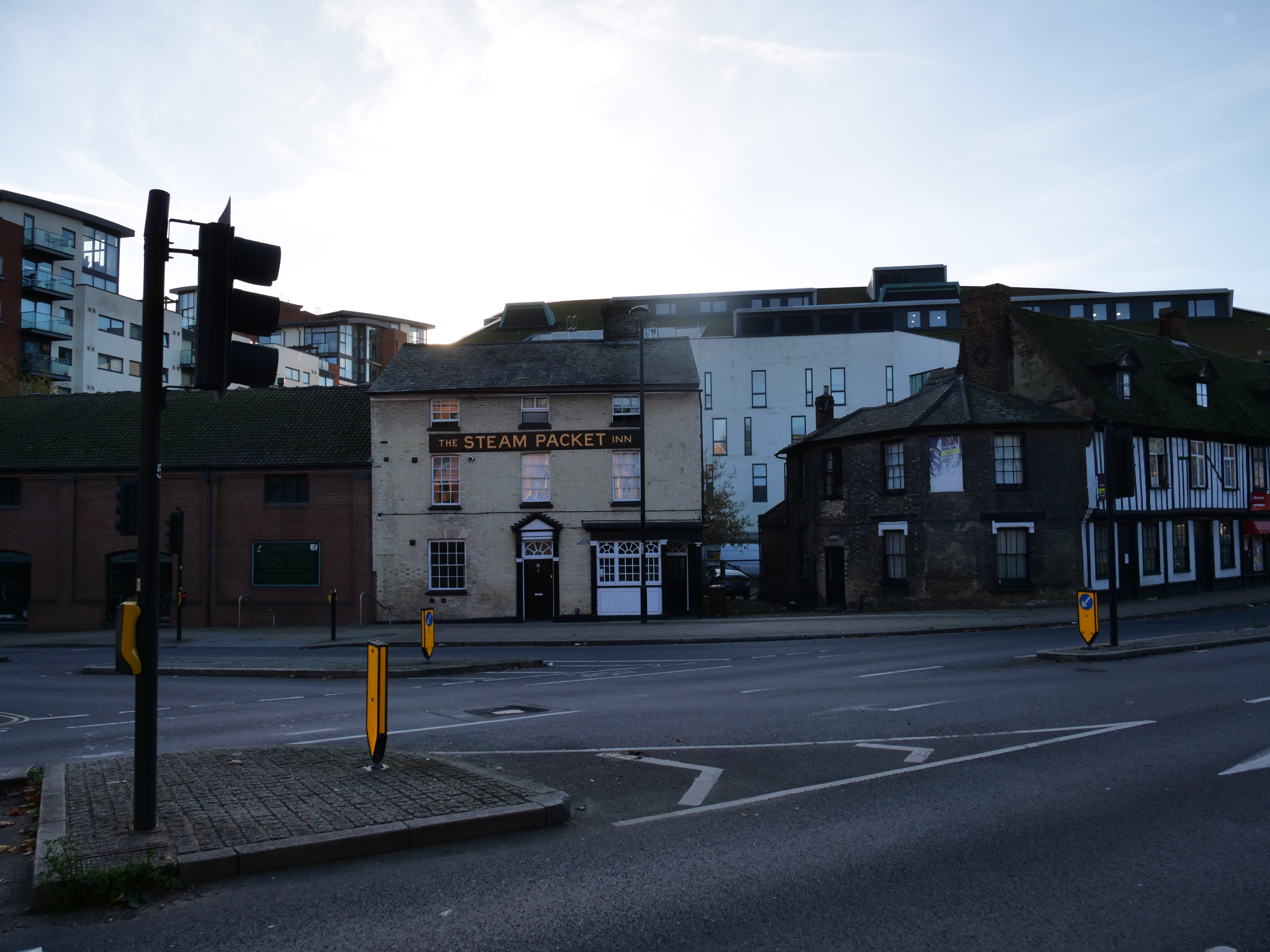
2 and 4, Duke Street is a Grade II listed building.

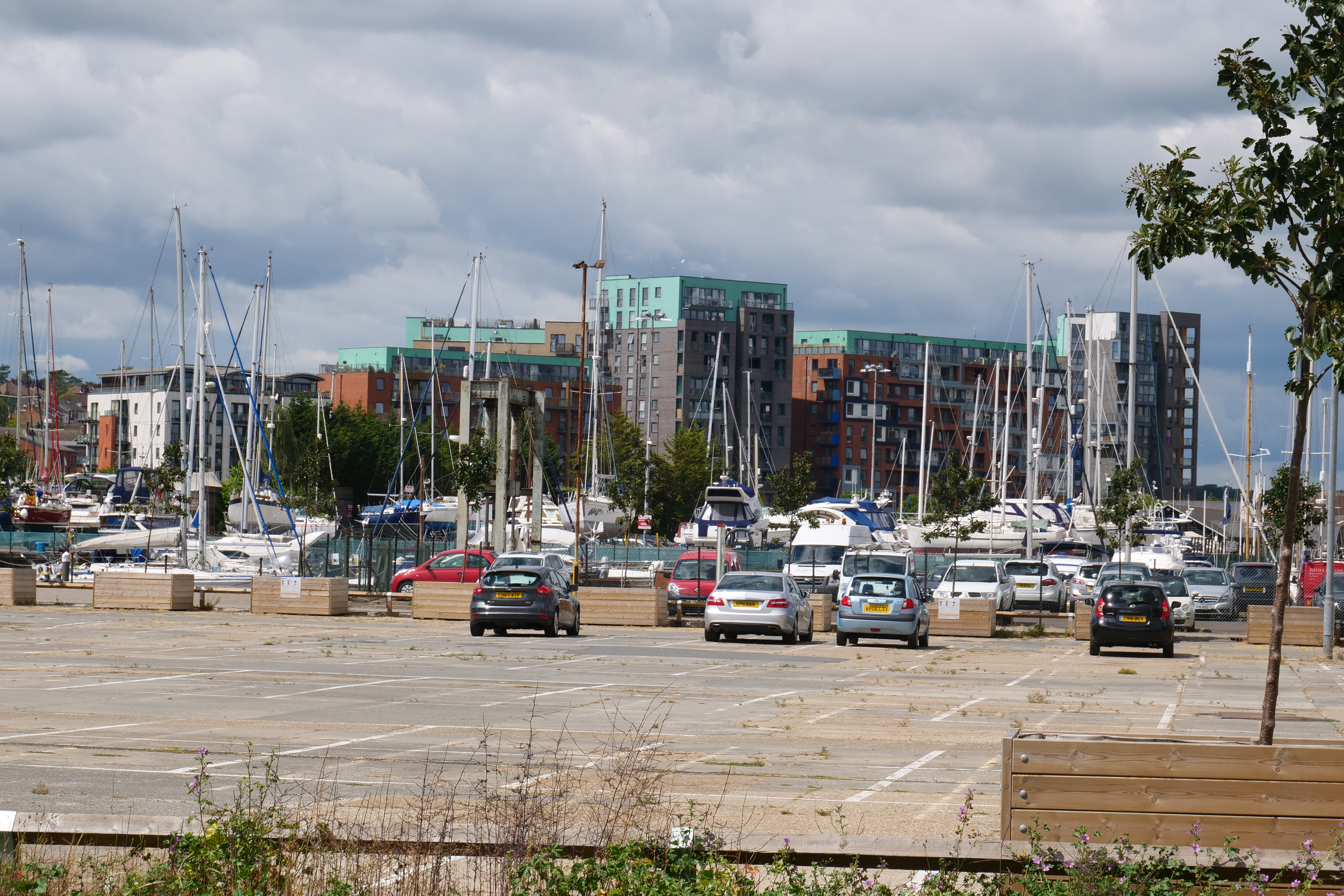
Site of Ransomes' Orwell Works, in 2020 a carpark
