= Coprolite Street =

Street in Ipswich, Suffolk

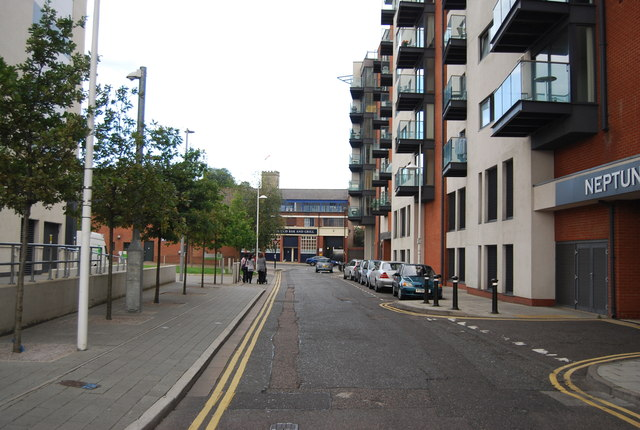
View of the street

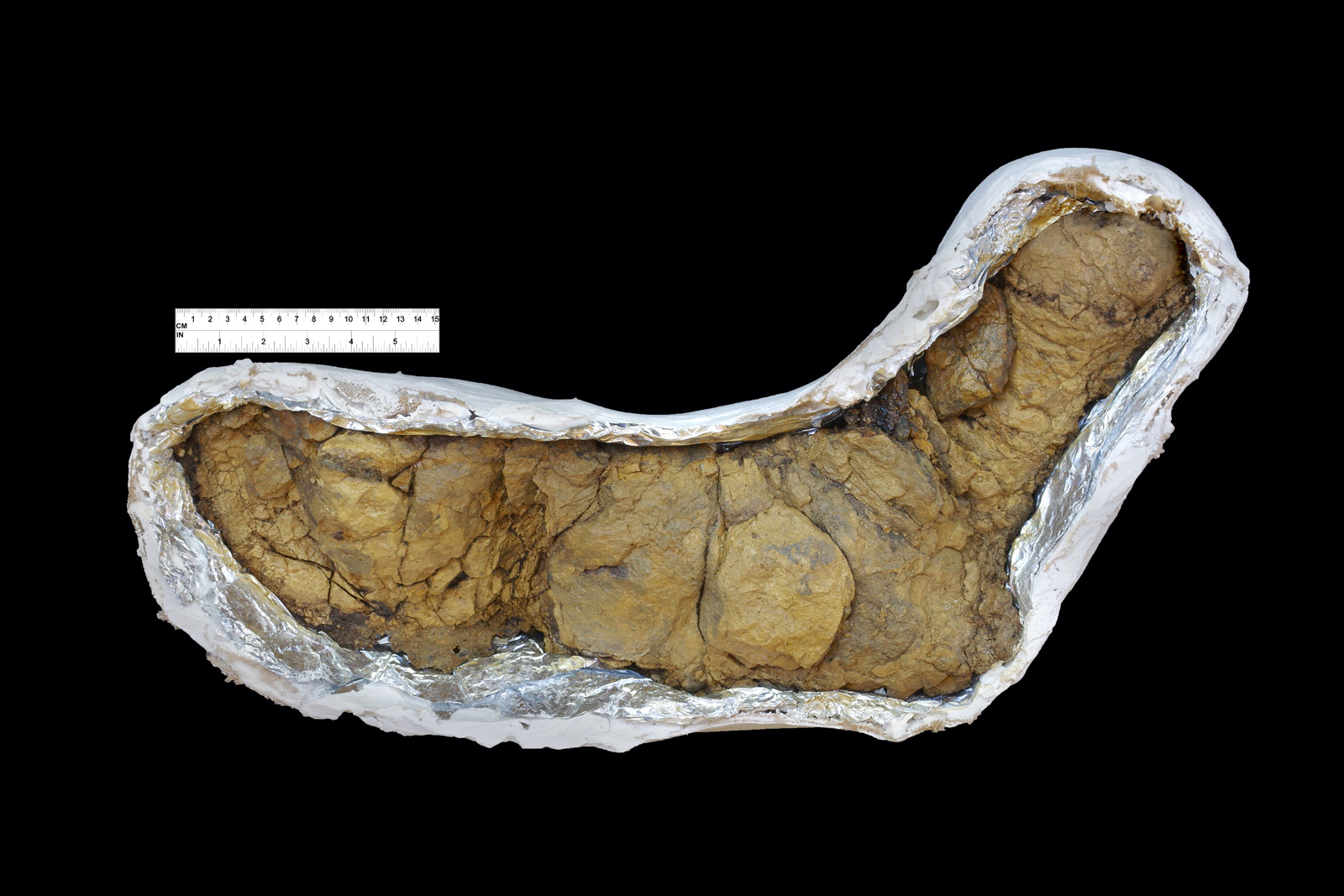
A large dinosaur (possible Tyrannosaurus) coprolite

Coprolite Street is a street in Ipswich, Suffolk in the Waterfront area. It runs from Duke Street to Neptune Marina, the former Orwell Quay. It was named after the factory which processed coprolite, or fossilised faeces, near Ipswich Docks. This factory was established by Edward Packard on the site of a former mill in 1849. It is believed by local people to be the only Coprolite Street in the country or even the world, and attracts geologists in particular who like to have their photograph taken by the street sign.
