= Tipredane =

Chemical compound

Clinical data
- Other names: SQ-27239; 17α-(Ethylthio)-9α-fluoro-11β-hydroxy-20-thiapregn-1,4-diene-3-one; 17α-(Ethylthio)-9α-fluoro-11β-hydroxy-17-(methylthio)androsta-1,4-dien-3-one
- Drug class: Corticosteroid; Glucocorticoid

Identifiers
- IUPAC name: (8S,9R,10S,11S,13S,14S,17R)-17-Ethylsulfanyl-9-fluoro-11-hydroxy-10,13-dimethyl-17-methylsulfanyl-6,7,8,11,12,14,15,16-octahydrocyclopenta[a]phenanthren-3-one
- CAS Number: 85197-77-9
- PubChem CID: 6917939
- ChemSpider: 5293158
- UNII: 169D68E13P
- KEGG: D06161
- ChEMBL: ChEMBL1908322
- CompTox Dashboard (EPA): DTXSID101318657

Chemical and physical data
- Formula: C_{22}H_{31}FO_{2}S_{2}
- Molar mass: 410.61 g·mol^{−1}
- 3D model (JSmol): Interactive image
- SMILES: CCS[C@@]1(CC[C@@H]2[C@@]1(C[C@@H]([C@]3([C@H]2CCC4=CC(=O)C=C[C@@]43C)F)O)C)SC
- InChI: InChI=1S/C22H31FO2S2/c1-5-27-21(26-4)11-9-16-17-7-6-14-12-15(24)8-10-19(14,2)22(17,23)18(25)13-20(16,21)3/h8,10,12,16-18,25H,5-7,9,11,13H2,1-4H3/t16-,17-,18-,19-,20-,21+,22-/m0/s1; Key:DXEXNWDGDYUITL-FXSSSKFRSA-N

Tipredane (developmental code name SQ-27239) is a synthetic glucocorticoid corticosteroid which was never marketed.
