= Coprolite =

Fossilized feces

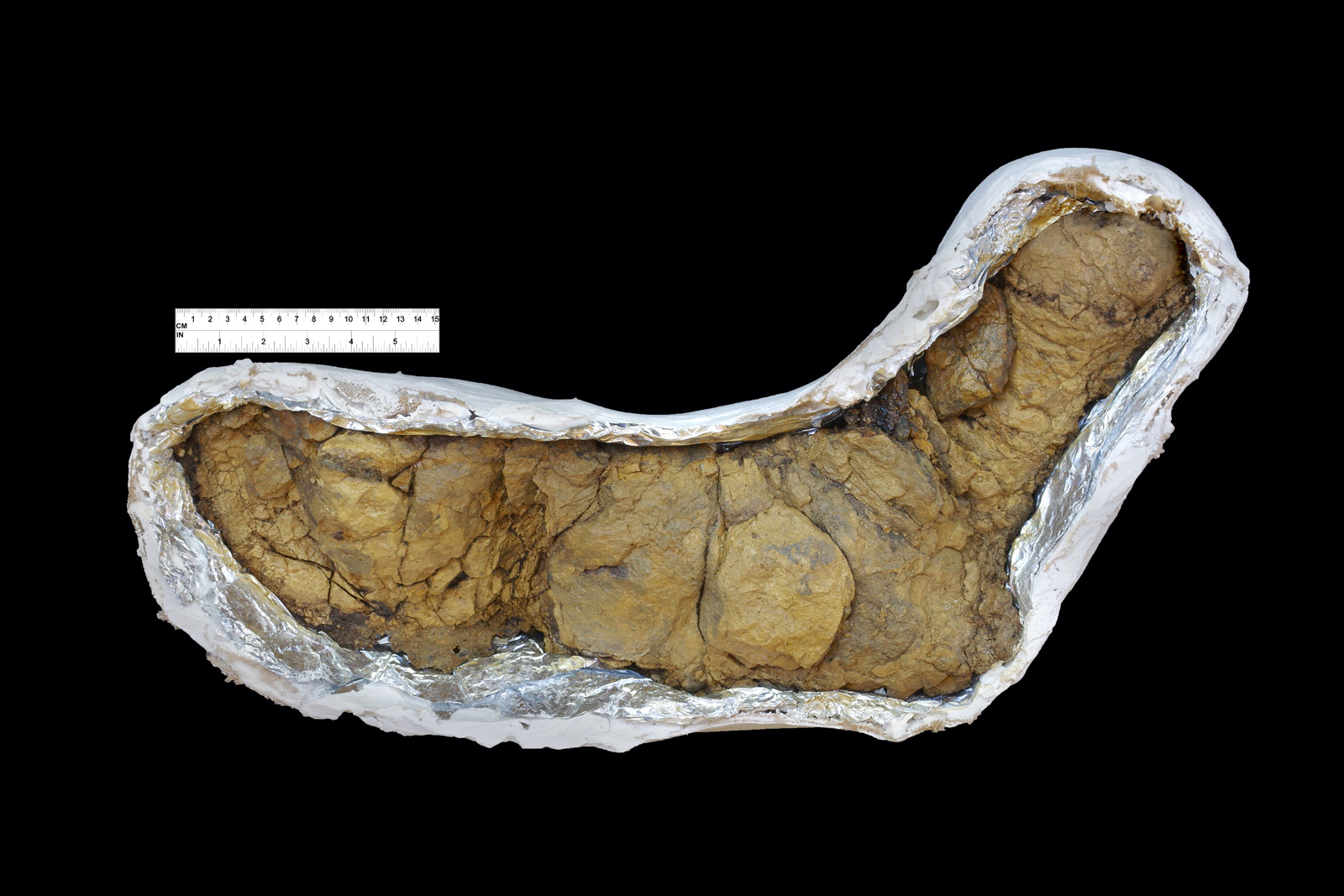
A large coprolite of a carnivorous dinosaur found in Harding County, South Dakota, US

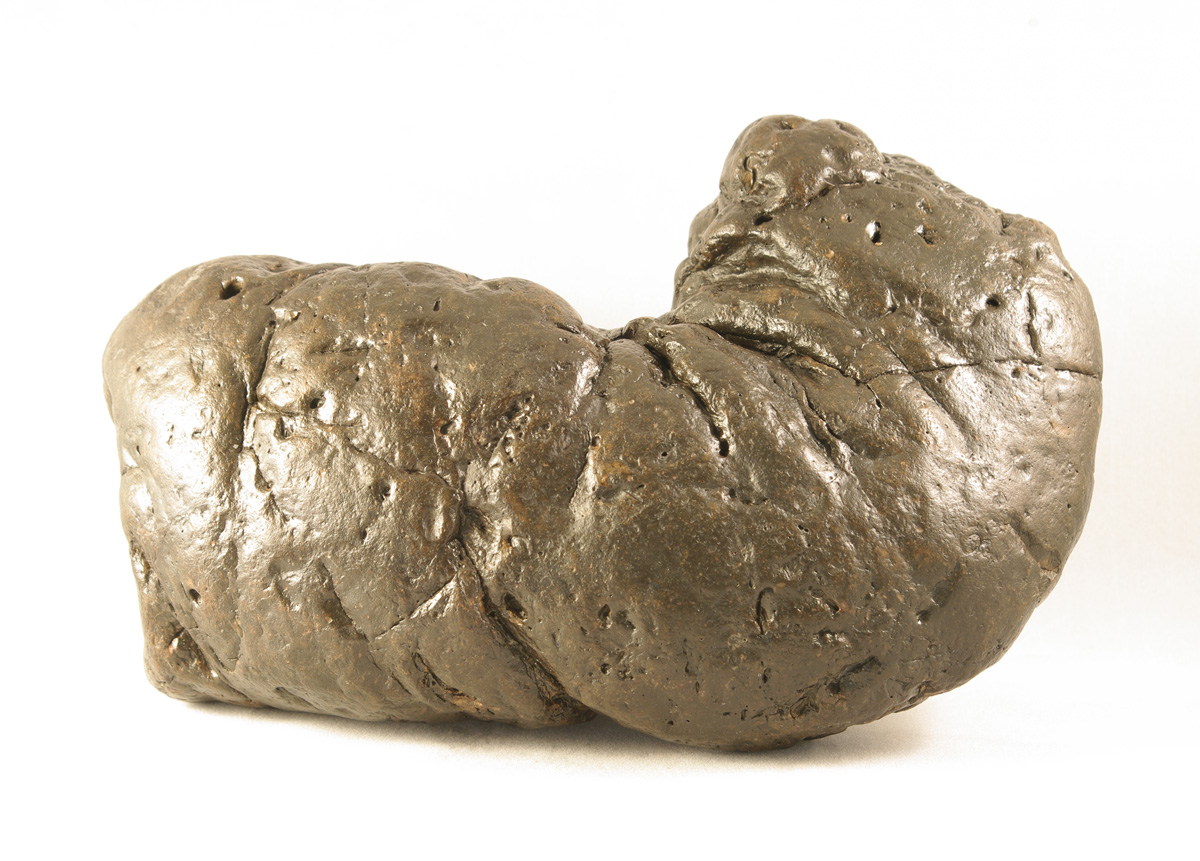
A large Miocene coprolite from South Carolina, US

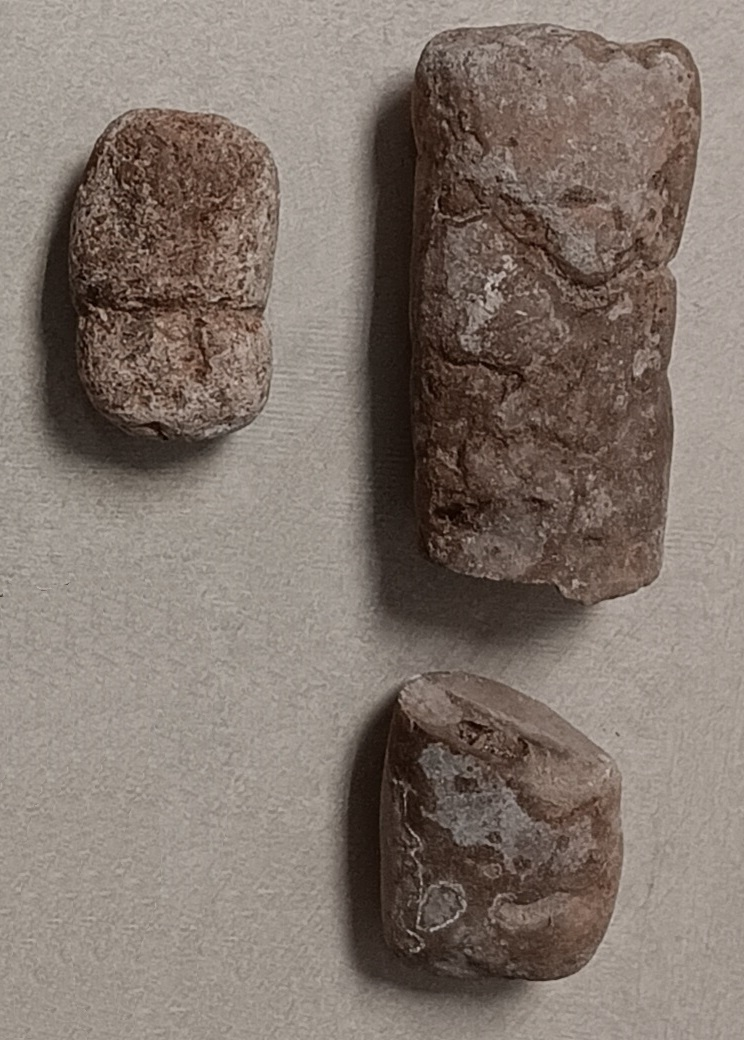
Coprolites found on the Blahnita riverbed, Romania, showing a seed inclusion (right specimen)

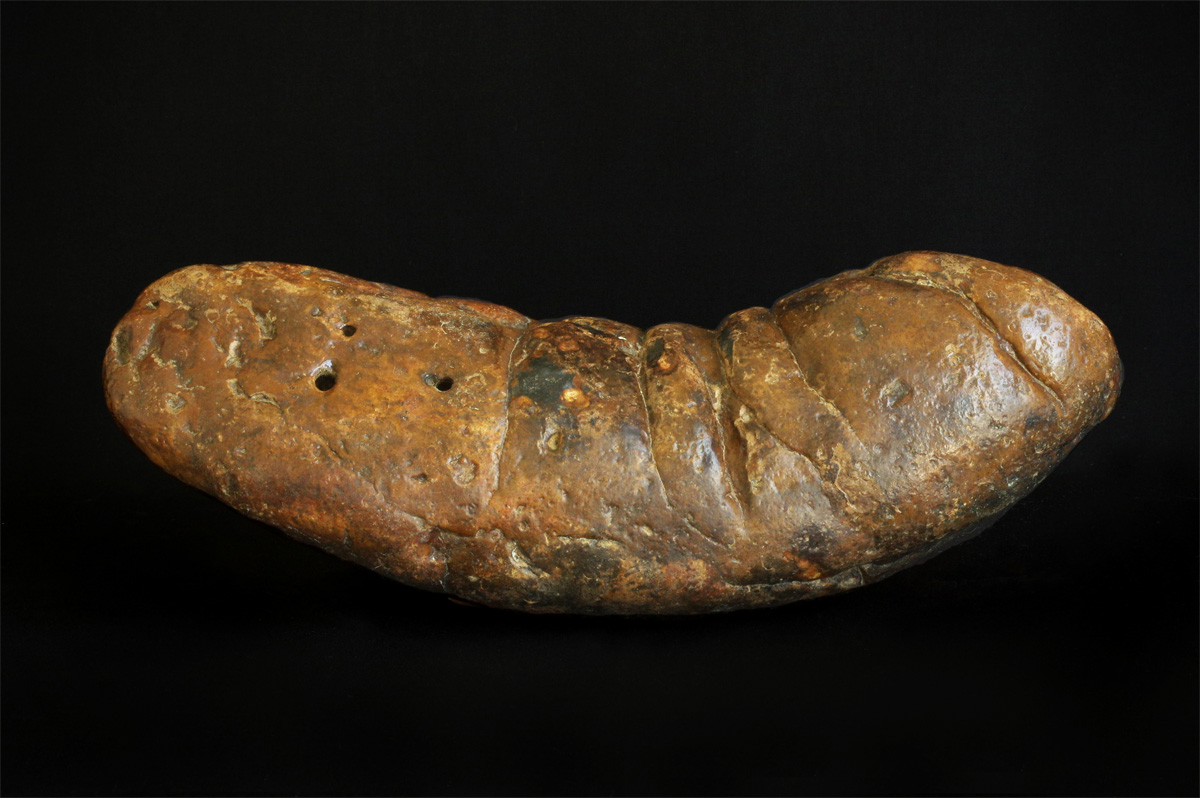
A large coprolite from South Carolina, US

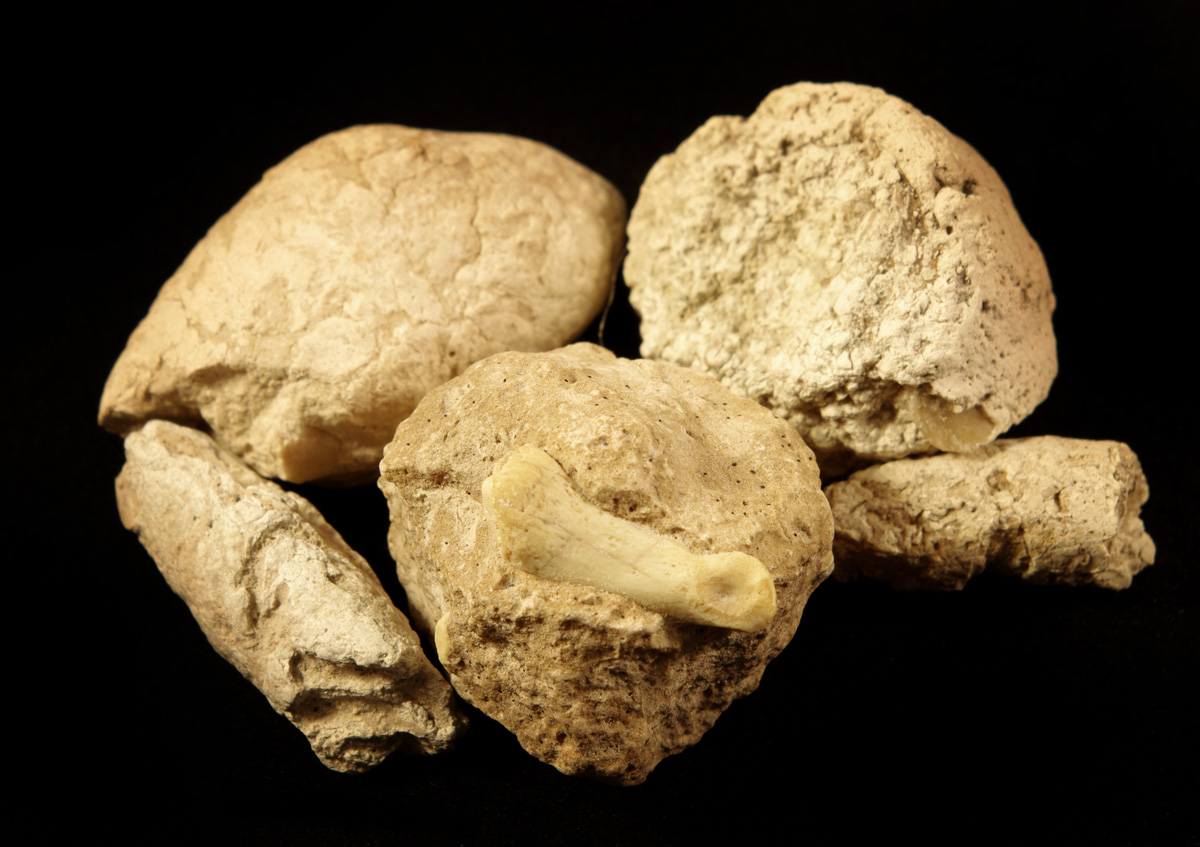
Age: White River Oligocene; Location: Northwest Nebraska; Dimensions: Varies (25 mm × 20 mm); Weight: 8-10 g; Features: Many small inclusions and one has a complete toe bone from the small ruminant Leptomeryx.

A coprolite (also known as a coprolith) is fossilized feces. Coprolites are classified as trace fossils as opposed to body fossils, as they give evidence for the animal's behaviour (in this case, diet) rather than morphology. The name derives from Ancient Greek κόπρος (kópros), meaning "dung", and λίθος (líthos), meaning "stone". They were first described by William Buckland in 1829. Before this, they were known as "fossil fir cones" and "bezoar stones". They serve a valuable purpose in paleontology because they provide direct evidence of the predation and diet of extinct organisms. Coprolites may range in size from a few millimetres to over 60 centimetres.

Coprolites, distinct from paleofeces, are fossilized animal dung. Like other fossils, coprolites have had much of their original composition replaced by mineral deposits such as silicates and calcium carbonates. Paleofeces, on the other hand, retain much of their original organic composition and can be reconstituted to determine their original chemical properties, though in practice the term coprolite is also used for ancient human fecal material in archaeological contexts. The study of coprolites in Japan was pioneered by Michiko Chiura.

== Initial discovery ==
British fossil hunter Mary Anning noticed as early as 1824 that "bezoar stones" were often found in the abdominal region of ichthyosaur skeletons found in the Lias formation at Lyme Regis. She also noted that if such stones were broken open they often contained fossilized fish bones and scales as well as sometimes bones from smaller ichthyosaurs. These observations by Anning led the geologist William Buckland to propose in 1829 that the stones were fossilized feces and to name them coprolites. Buckland also suspected that the spiral markings on the fossils indicated that ichthyosaurs had spiral ridges in their intestines similar to those of modern sharks and that some of these coprolites were black with ink from swallowed belemnites.

== Research value ==
By examining coprolites, paleontologists are able to find information about the diet of the animal (if bones or other food remains are present), such as whether it was a herbivore or a carnivore, and the taphonomy of the coprolites, although the producer is rarely identified unambiguously, especially with more ancient examples. Even when the producers of coprolites found in a given geological unit cannot be confidently determined, the coprolites can still provide information about the trophic structure of the ecosystem and the palaeoenvironment. In some instances, knowledge about the anatomy of animals' digestive tracts can be helpful in assigning a coprolite to the animal that produced it, one example being the finding that the Triassic dinosauriform Silesaurus may have been an insectivore, a suggestion which was based on the beak-like jaws of the animal and the high density of beetle remains found in associated coprolites. Further, coprolites can be analyzed for certain minerals that are known to exist in trace amounts in certain species of plant that can still be detected millions of years later. In rare cases, coprolites have even been found to contain well-preserved insect remains. There is also a documented case of a coprolite containing an ichnofossil in the form of footprints of a crocodilian, created when a crocodilian stepped on the faecal matter before it became fossilised.

== Recognizing coprolites ==
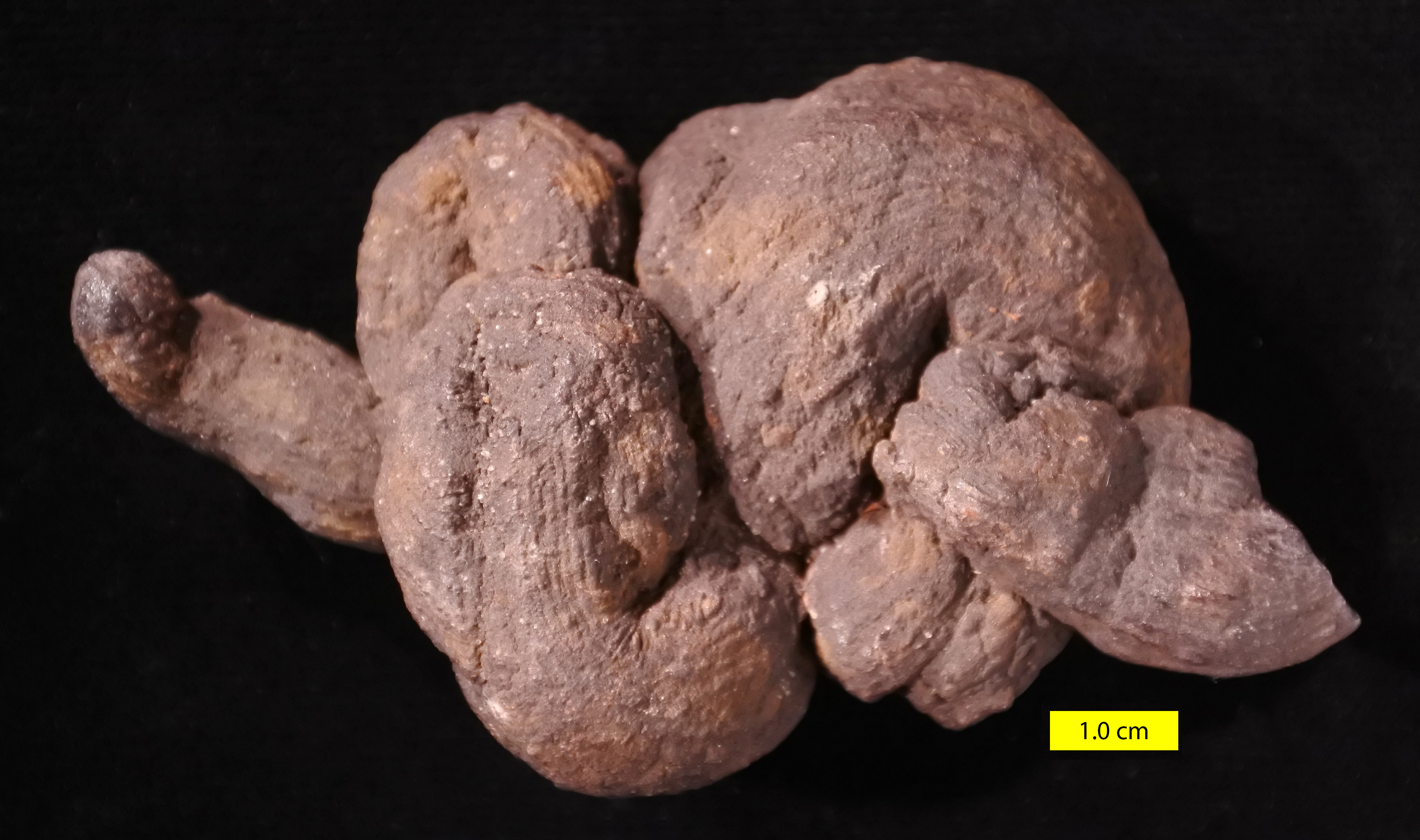
A Miocene pseudocoprolite from Washington state. They are commonly mistaken for coprolites because of their appearance and shape; they are actually of inorganic origin. Scale in mm. See Spencer (1993).

The recognition of coprolites is aided by their structural patterns, such as spiral or annular markings, content, undigested food fragments, and associated fossil remains. The smallest coprolites are often difficult to distinguish from inorganic pellets or from eggs. Most coprolites are composed chiefly of calcium phosphate, along with minor quantities of organic matter. By analyzing coprolites, it is possible to infer the diet of the animal which produced them.

Coprolites have been recorded in deposits ranging in age from the Cambrian period to recent times and are found worldwide. Some of them are useful as index fossils, such as Favreina from the Jurassic period of Haute-Savoie in France.

Some marine deposits contain a high proportion of fecal remains. However, animal excrement is easily fragmented and destroyed, so usually has little chance of becoming fossilized.

== Coprolite mining ==
In 1842 the Rev John Stevens Henslow, a professor of botany at St John's College, Cambridge, discovered coprolites just outside Felixstowe in Suffolk in the villages of Trimley St Martin, Falkenham and Kirton and investigated their composition. Realizing their potential as a source of available phosphate once they had been treated with sulfuric acid, he patented an extraction process and set about finding new sources.

Very soon, coprolites were being mined on an industrial scale for use as fertilizer due to their high phosphate content. The major area of extraction occurred over the east of England, centered on Cambridgeshire and the Isle of Ely with its refining being carried out in Ipswich by the Fison Company. There is a Coprolite Street near Ipswich docks where the Fisons works once stood.

The industry declined in the 1880s but was revived briefly during the First World War to provide phosphates for munitions. A renewed interest in coprolite mining in the First World War extended the area of interest into parts of Buckinghamshire as far west as Woburn Sands.

== See also ==
- Bromalite
- Fecalith
- Fossils and the geological timescale
- Gastrolith
- Guano
- Lloyds Bank coprolite
- Regurgitalith
- The World of Poo
- Petrifaction
- Petrified wood
