= John Duvall (artist) =

English painter

John Duvall (3 September 1815, Margate, Kent – 13 May 1892, Ipswich) was a nineteenth century English artist who painted landscapes, sporting and rustic subjects. He lived in Ipswich and exhibited work at the Royal Academy, the British Institution and the Royal Society of British Artists. He was part of the "Suffolk School" of painting.

He was born in Kent but moved to Ipswich by 1852 where he taught drawing and set up studio in the Butter Market. Although originally a portrait painter, when the number of portrait commissions declined owing to the spread of photography, he started to specialise in painting horses. He provided illustrations for the Suffolk Horse Society's Stud Book.

In 1875 he became the first chairperson of the Ipswich Fine Art Club of which he remained a member until 1889.

== Gallery ==
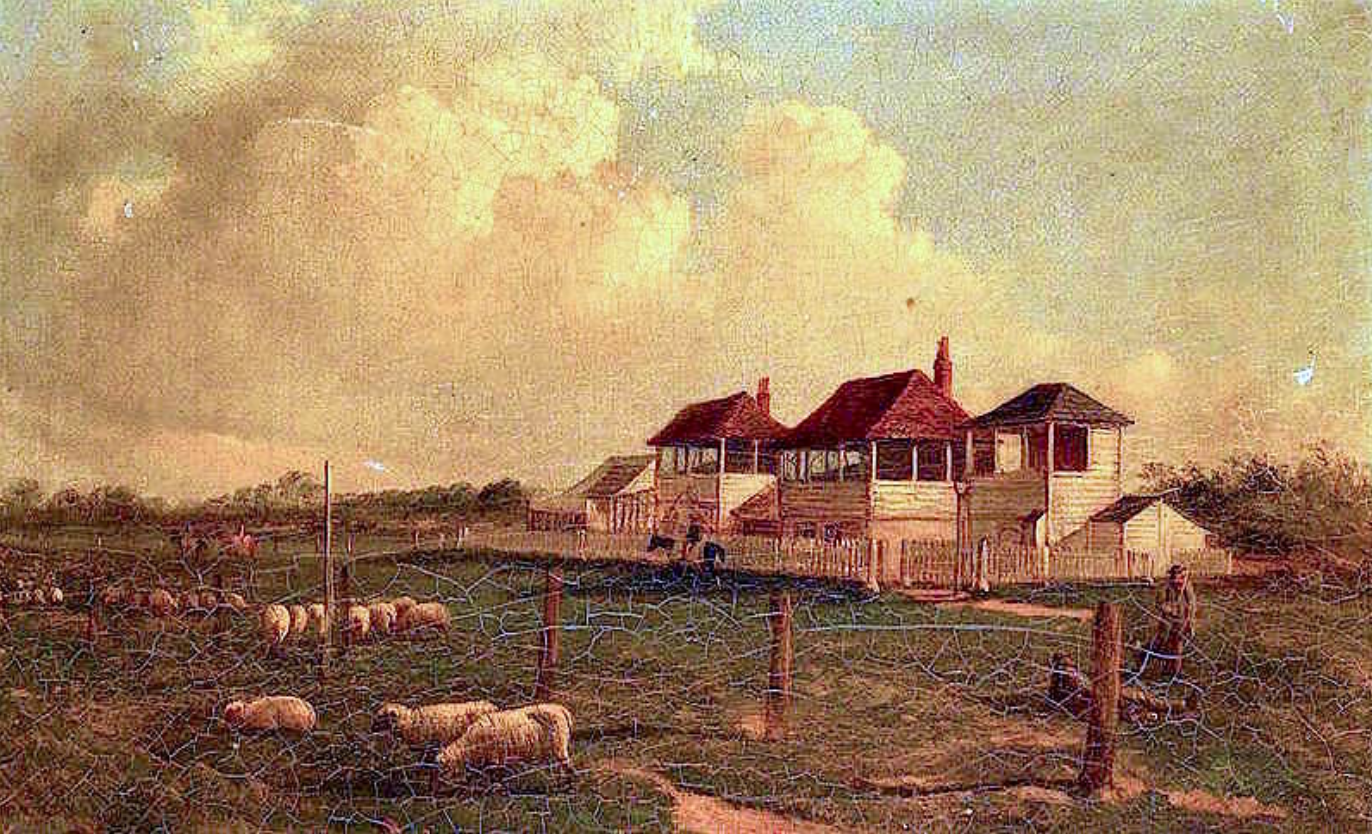
Ipswich Racecourse, Suffolk

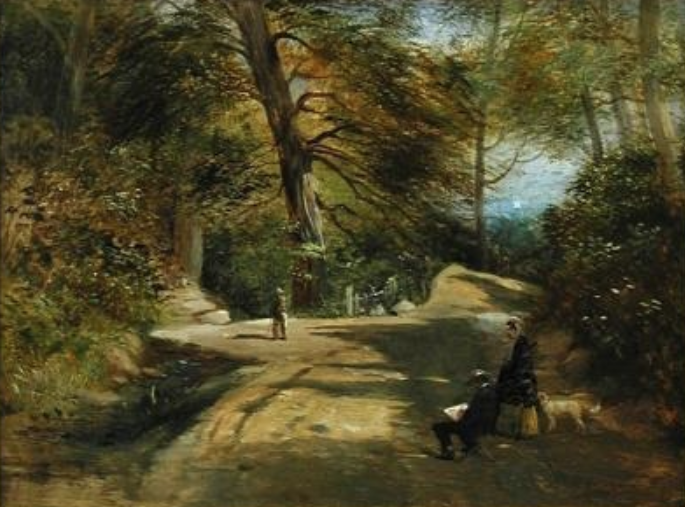
A view in Clapgate Lane, Ipswich, Suffolk
