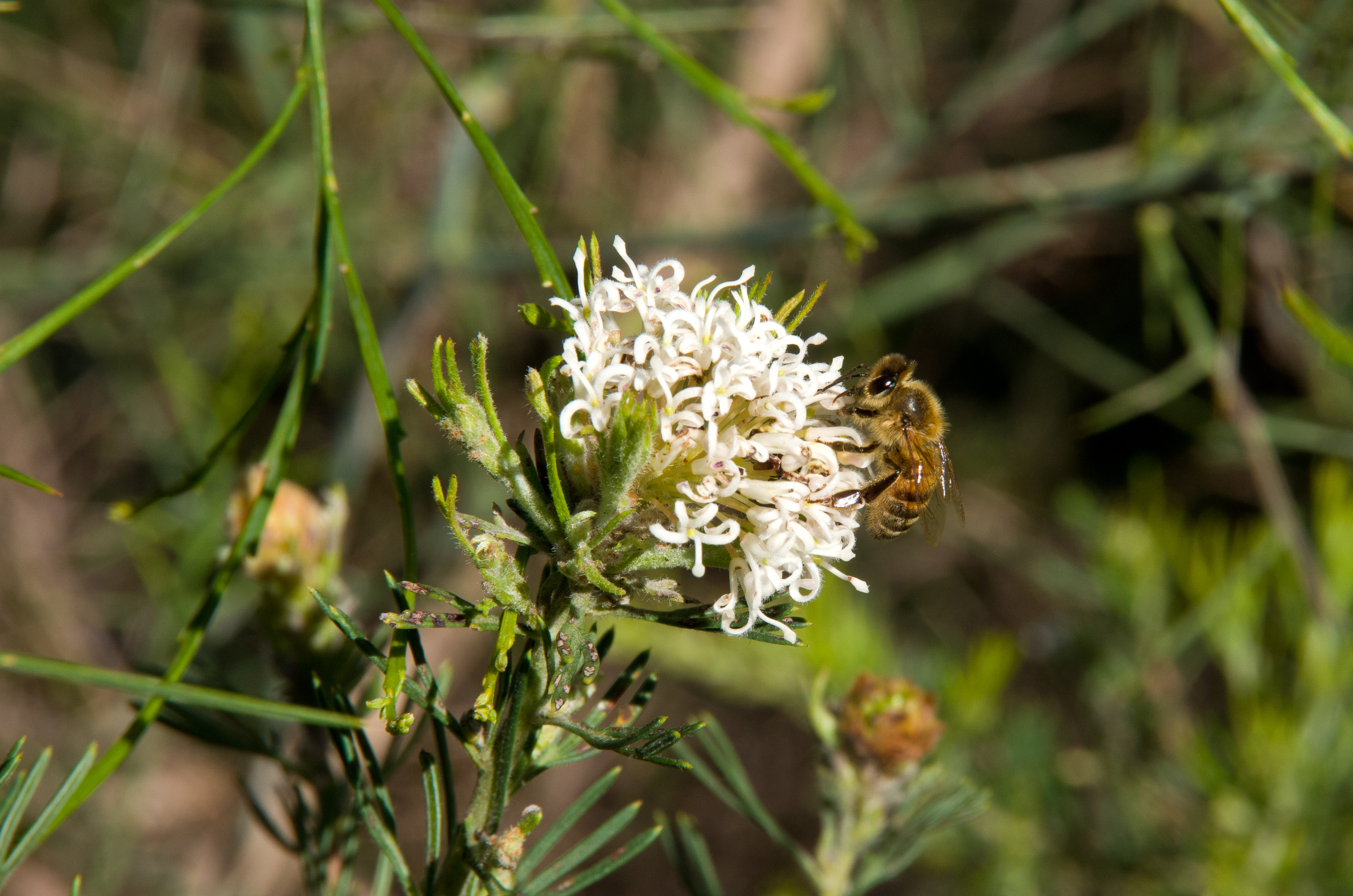
- In Kings Park, Perth

Conservation status
- Least Concern (IUCN 3.1)

Scientific classification
- Kingdom: Plantae
- Clade: Embryophytes
- Clade: Tracheophytes
- Clade: Spermatophytes
- Clade: Angiosperms
- Clade: Eudicots
- Order: Proteales
- Family: Proteaceae
- Genus: Grevillea
- Species: G. crithmifolia

Binomial name
- Grevillea crithmifolia R.Br.

Synonyms
- Grevillea sternbergiana Benth. nom. inval., pro syn.

= Grevillea crithmifolia =

Species of shrub endemic to Western Australia

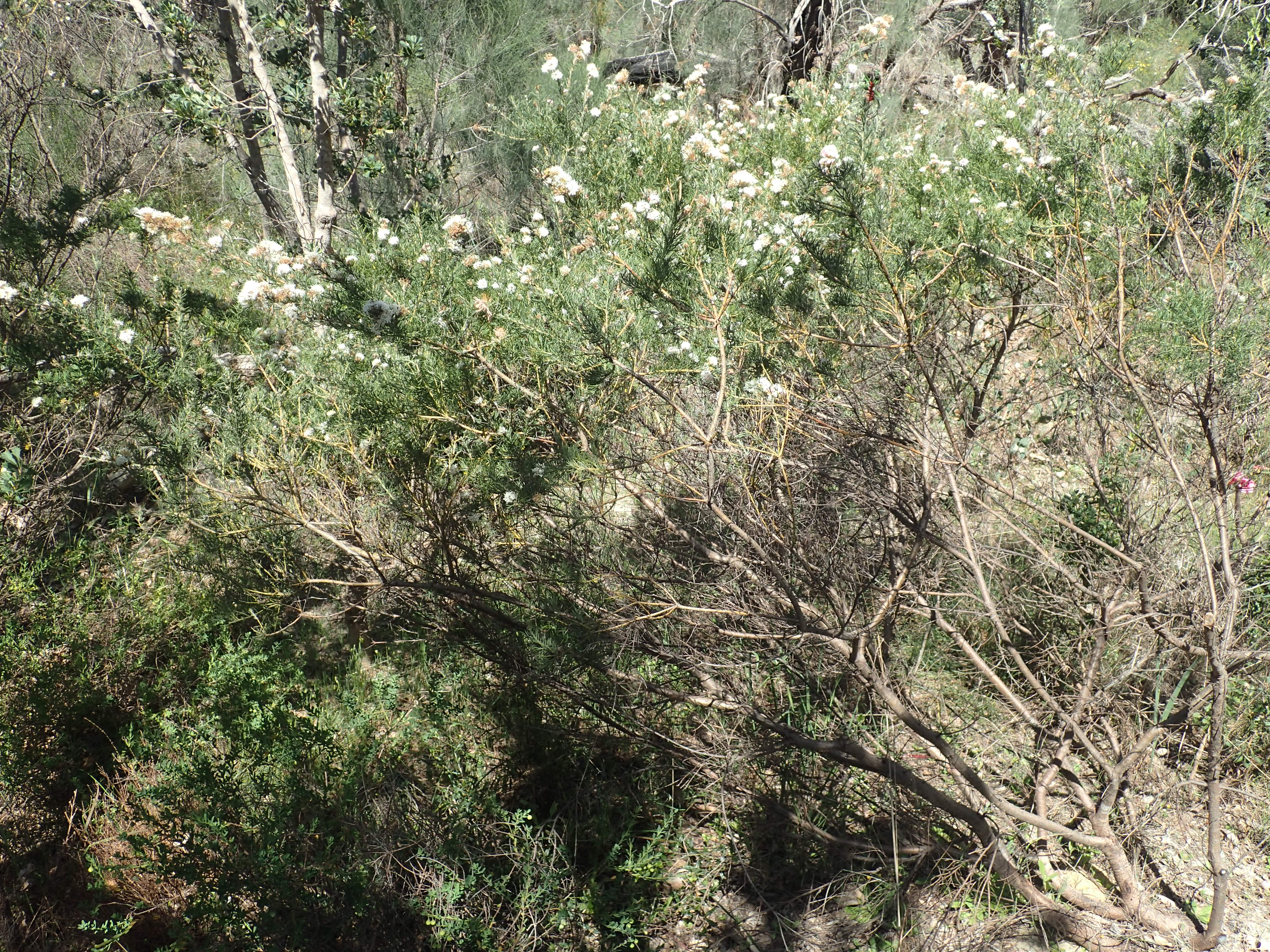
Habit in Kings Park

Grevillea crithmifolia is a species of flowering plant in the family Proteaceae and is endemic to the south-west of Western Australia. It is a dense shrub with linear leaves, divided leaves with narrowly oblong lobes, or both, and clusters of pale pink to creamy-white flowers.

== Description ==
Grevillea crithmifolia is a dense shrub that typically grows to a height of 0.6–2.5 m (2 ft 0 in – 8 ft 2 in), its branchlets covered with shaggy hairs. The leaves are crowded, either linear, 10–20 mm (0.39–0.79 in) long and 0.7 mm (0.028 in) wide or divided and 5–10 mm (0.20–0.39 in) wide with two to five narrowly oblong lobes 0.7–1.7 mm (0.028–0.067 in) wide, or both. The flowers are pale pink to creamy-white and arranged in clusters on a rachis 6–12 mm (0.24–0.47 in) long, the pistil 4.8–6.0 mm (0.19–0.24 in) long. Flowering occurs from June to September and the fruit is an elliptic to oval follicle 12–15 mm (0.47–0.59 in) long.

== Taxonomy ==
Grevillea crithmifolia was first formally described in 1830 by Robert Brown in the Supplementum primum prodromi florae Novae Hollandiae from specimens collected by Charles Fraser in 1827 in the Swan River Colony. The specific epithet (crithmifolia) means "Crithmum-leaved".

== Distribution and habitat ==
Grevillea crithmifolia usually grows in near-coastal woodland or scrub between Wanneroo and Yalgorup National Park with a disjunct population near Dongara in the Swan Coastal Plain biogeographic region of south-western Western Australia.

== Conservation status ==
This grevillea is listed as least concern on the IUCN Red List and as not threatened by the Department of Biodiversity, Conservation and Attractions.
