= Edward Packard (businessman, born 1819) =

Founder of Fisons (1819–1899)

Edward Packard, senior (5 January 1819 Hasketon–1899), was an English chemist and businessperson who founded and developed a major artificial fertilizer industry near Ipswich, Suffolk in the mid-nineteenth century, and became a wealthy and prominent figure in the life of the Borough. His son, Sir Edward Packard, junior (28 September 1843 – 11 April 1932) developed Packard and James Fison (Thetford) Limited ('Fisons') into one of the largest fertiliser manufacturing businesses in the United Kingdom.

== Early years ==
Edward Packard senior, born in Thorpe Hall, Hasketon near Woodbridge, Suffolk in 1819, the son of John Harrison Packard and his wife Elizabeth (née Harper) daughter of William Harper, of Falkenham Hall, Suffolk. He was articled to Francis Cupiss (1798 - 1888). Cupiss qualified as a veterinary surgeon in 1822, practiced as a chemist, and established a letterpress printing business in Diss in 1830. Packard studied pharmaceutical chemistry with Cupiss, before setting up his artificial manure company in Saxmundham in 1841. He soon installed a manager and went to London to study under John Collis Nesbit who had recently started a natural sciences course at his fathers school in Kennington. Nesbit was developing the school into an agricultural college with a consultancy business providing agricultural chemical analysis services to both manufacturers and farmers.

== Fertiliser business ==
Packard realised the importance of Nesbit's work and also Professor J.S. Henslow's recognition in 1843 that the so-called "Coprolites" at the basement bed of the Pleistocene Red Crag Formation of Suffolk were rich in phosphates. He moved his works to Ipswich in 1849.

He built up the E. Packard & Co. business in artificial fertilisers at Bramford near Ipswich, Suffolk. As the honorific President of Ipswich Museum, worked to shape that institution into a resource for scientific education.

Commencing experimental workings at Snape in 1843, and entering contracts for supply of the raw materials (freighted by barges and lighters), Packard set up his first factory in Ipswich in an old flour-mill on the Orwell quay in 1847. This was used as a coprolite warehouse after he relocated the processing works to Bramford (by 1854), as rail freight became available and the sulphurous fumes from the works demanded more rural location. Such was his success that the elder Packard (nicknamed 'The Coprolite King' or, more informally, 'the Golden Muck-Man of Ipswich') served as Mayor of the Borough in 1868.

Edward Packard, senior, retired about 1889, and his business was the run by his sons Edward Packard, junior, and Henry Wood Packard.

== Civic involvement and the advancement of science ==
He contributed immensely to the town's Victorian prosperity. He was an Alderman for Ipswich Corporation and served as Mayor in 1868–9. He was also the Chair of the Ipswich Corporation's museum committee which advocated the recruitment of the geologist John Ellor Taylor as Curator in 1872. Taylor had founded the Norwich Science-Gossip Society and became the founding example for the sister Society in Ipswich, in which the sons of the town's industry-owning families met regularly to improve their scientific knowledge and understanding of its industrial applications. As the Crag workings for coprolites produced many unusual fossils the Museum's collections were also greatly enriched. In addition to Crag specimens, Packard notably obtained and presented a near-complete ichthyosaur skeleton from the Lias at Street, Somerset for the benefit of the New Museum opened in 1880, where it can still be seen.

== Ipswich Museum and the promotion of science ==
Packard took Dr. Taylor to inspect his phosphate mines in southern France, in the area of the Puy de Dôme, in 1876, and Taylor responded with deep interest. Packard resigned his Chairmanship of the Museum Committee (making way for his son) when Taylor's ill health led to his enforced retirement in 1893. Taylor was succeeded as Curator by his friend Frank Woolnough, but it was not until after Taylor's death in 1895 that Packard was willing to accept the role of President of the Museum for a short period until his death in 1899.
