= Ipswich Art Society =

Society for exhibiting the work of artists based in Ipswich, Suffolk, UK

Ipswich Art Society is an exhibiting organisation for painters, sculptors and printmakers, based in Ipswich, Suffolk. It was founded as the Ipswich Fine Art Club in 1874. It changed its name to Ipswich Art Club in 1925 and in 1993 to Ipswich Art Society.

== Foundation as Ipswich Fine Art Club ==
Ipswich Fine Art Club was founded on Tuesday 24 November 1874 at Ipswich Museum. Alderman Edward Packard was the main force behind it, with support from Rev Henry Cruso, of Bramford. The painter, John Duvall, was the first chairperson. In 1875 It began organising an annual exhibition, with pictures loaned from museums in South Kensington and elsewhere. Although to start off with the profits were given to charities, from 1878 any money raised was put towards building their own permanent gallery. They appointed a Building Committee. Anna Airy was elected President in 1945.

== Exhibitions ==
- Ipswich Fine Art Club Exhibition, 1880
