= Falkenham =

Village in Suffolk, England

Coordinates: 52°00′N 1°21′E

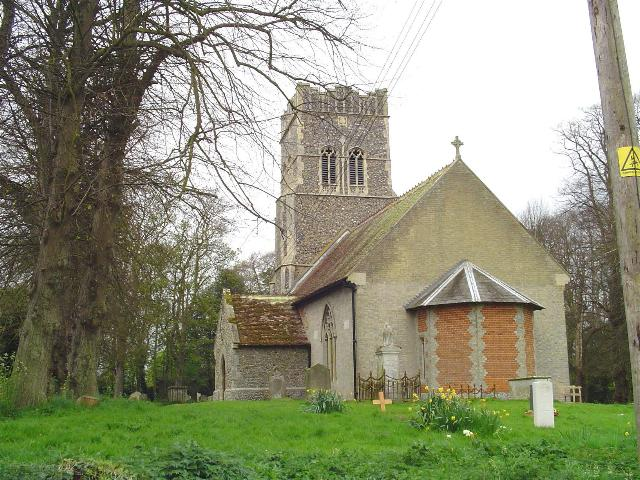
- St Ethelbert's Church

- Location within Suffolk
- Population: 170 (2011 census)
- Civil parish: Falkenham
- District: East Suffolk
- Shire county: Suffolk
- Region: East
- Country: England
- Sovereign state: United Kingdom
- Police: Suffolk
- Fire: Suffolk
- Ambulance: East of England

Falkenham is a village and a civil parish in the East Suffolk district, in the English county of Suffolk, near the village of Kirton and the towns of Ipswich and Felixstowe. The population of the civil parish as of the 2011 census was 170.

== Description ==
The parish contains the hamlets of Falkenham Sink and Lower Falkenham. The parish church is dedicated to St Ethelbert and is a grade II* listed building. The major A14 road runs nearby.

The Falkenham Marshes are on the River Deben.

== History ==
At the time of the Norman Conquest the manor of Walton was linked with that of Falkenham. The village's only Public House, The Falkenham Dog, closed in 1975/6.

== See also ==
Dommoc#Felixstowe
