= The Century of Warfare =

- Developed by: Nugus/Martin Productions Ltd.
- Starring: Robert Powell
- Country of origin: United Kingdom
- No. of seasons: 1
- No. of episodes: 26

Original release
- Release: 1993

The Century of Warfare is a 26-part British TV documentary first released in 1993 and shown on A&E Television Networks. It was narrated by Robert Powell, and produced by Nugus/Martin Productions Ltd, and coincided with another Powell/Nugus-Martin project called Great Crimes and Trials.

== Summary ==
The series endeavours to overview the entire century of world conflict from the turn of the century (1900) until the Gulf War in 1990/91. It covers every major conflict, as well as reviewing inter-war periods and military build-ups. It also examines lesser known theatres of major wars.

According to the official website, "An unparalleled collection of military and historical archives has been assembled from the USA, Japan, Britain, Germany, France, Italy and Russia, to contribute to this epic work."

== Episodes ==
52 minutes each. For full episode contents and details refer to the official homepage.

1. The Violent Century
2. The World Goes to War - 1900-14
3. Blood and Mud - Trench Warfare in the West 1914-18
4. War of the Eagles - The Eastern Front 1914-18
5. Battle Fleets and U-Boats - Naval Warfare 1914-18
6. Aces High - Air Warfare 1914-18
7. War to End All War? - 1918 and the Aftermath
8. Enter the Dictators - 1920-35
9. The War Clouds Gather - 1935-39
10. Blitzkrieg! - 1939-40
11. Britain Stands Alone - 1940-41
12. Sand and Sea War - War in the Mediterranean 1941-44
13. Hitler Turns East - Eastern Front 1941-43
14. The Long Road Back - Eastern Front 1943-45
15. Normandy to the Rhine - Western Front 1944-45
16. The End In Europe - Eastern and Western Fronts 1945
17. Oriental Blitzkrieg - Pacific Theatre 1939-42
18. Jungle and Ocean - Pacific Theatre 1943-45
19. The War at Sea - 1939-45
20. Air War - 1939-45
21. Iron Curtain - The Cold War 1946-89
22. Oriental Communism - China, Indo-China, and Korea 1946-89
23. Wars in Peace - 1945-89
24. Vietnam - 1955-89
25. War in the Middle East - 1945-89
26. Gulf War and the Future

OTHER

1. DVD Bonus Documentary (length 1:56)

== Reception ==
The series received mixed reviews:

=== Positive ===
"The essential question, with a documentary this ambitious in scope, is whether it presents its material in both an understandable and an interesting manner, and The Century of Warfare comes out very well in both regards. Some of the material is highly complex...and the documentary does a very creditable job of presenting the facts and background information in a comprehensible manner. The Century of Warfare sets out on an ambitious program and lives up to its billing, offering an insightful and thorough look at the violent 20th century."

=== Neutral ===
"While it was certainly a monumental task to edit all of the footage together, that is all it is: a patchwork. Nothing new is offered: no tours of battlefields, or anything that would bring it to life. Naturally the film quality is poor due to its age, but images shown were clearly selected for their historical relevance to the narration, not their cinematography, and they are indeed excellent images."

"Certainly, this is a fine introduction to a vast subject and does a sturdy job of describing and explicating on a certain level. But, some matters are oversimplified and ultimately the result is less than satisfactory. However, anyone who views parts of this documentary and then goes on to read more about the Holocaust, the politics of nuclear war and the misuses of power in the pursuit of political domination will count as a victory for the producers."

=== Negative ===
"You will find few war stories...interesting in The Century of Warfare, an interminable series from the History Channel. A low-budget 1993 British production that relies on public domain footage, library music, and a monotonous British narrator with a soporific voice, this 26-episode series somehow manages to make one of the most inherently interesting subjects stunningly pedestrian and dull."

The episode dealing with the events of 1943-45 (Episode 14) on the Balkan peninsula and the area of Yugoslavia may have several errors, namely Josip Broz Tito was not Serbian but rather born to Croatian and Slovenian parents, the Chetnik movement was not based in Croatia but in Serbia, and the flag colours depicting the partisans were incorrect.

== DVD ==
- US Release Date: 24 June 2003
- Number of discs: 7
- Rating: NR (Not Rated)
- Studio: A&E Home Video
- Aspect Ratio: 1.33:1
- Run Time: 1350 minutes

The DVD Bonus Documentary, although credited as 1994, includes information up to the capture of Saddam Hussein in December 2003, as well as the Madrid train bombings of 11 March 2004. It was narrated by Gerrard McArthur, and unlike the rest of the series, used computer simulations to recreate battles.
