= Hilsea =

Suburb of Portsmouth, Hampshire, England

Coordinates: 50.83°N 1.07°W

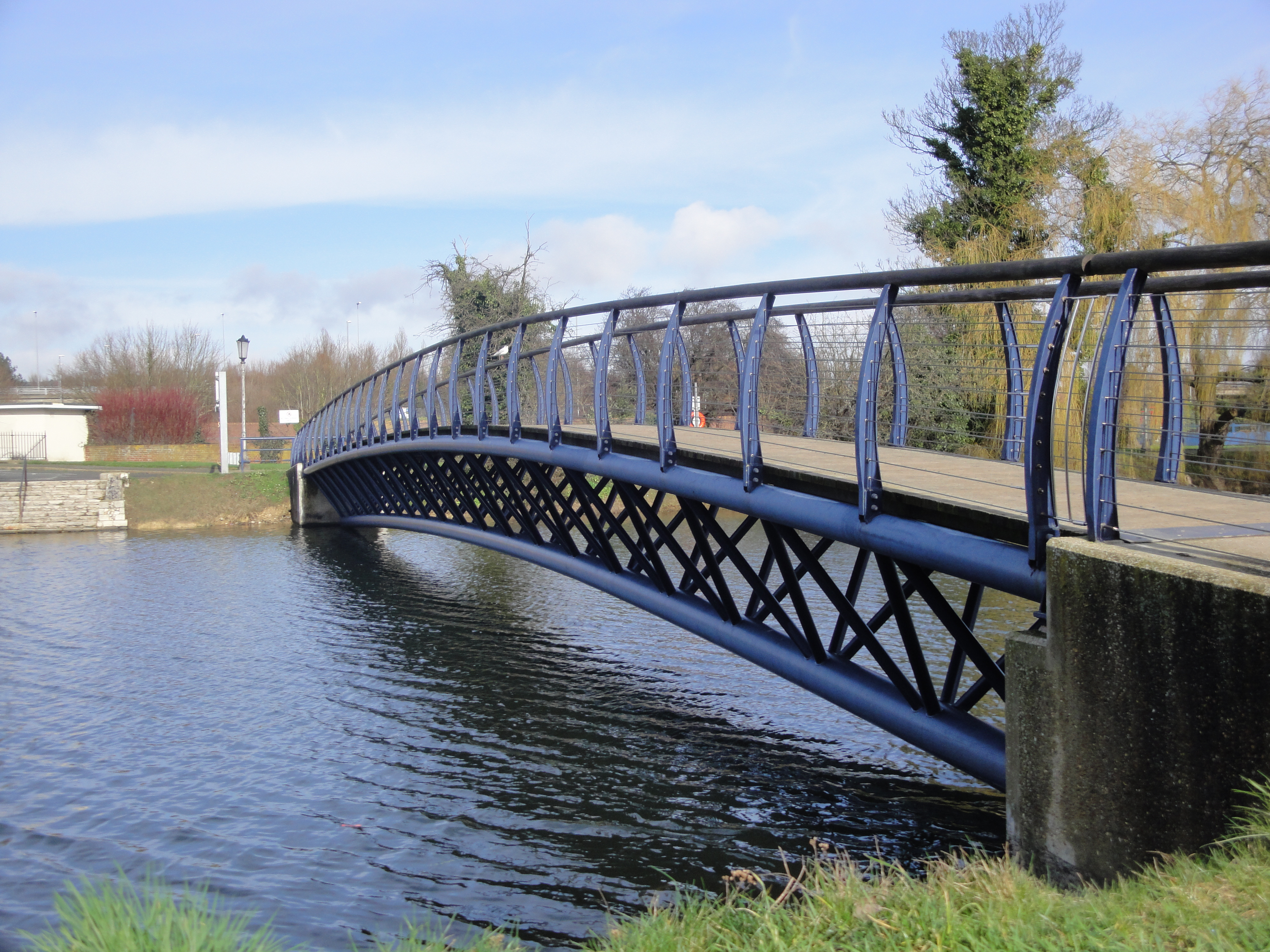
- Hilsea Lagoon footbridge

- Location within Hampshire
- Population: 13,552 (2011 Census. Hilsea Ward)
- OS grid reference: SU663035
- Unitary authority: Portsmouth
- Ceremonial county: Hampshire
- Region: South East
- Country: England
- Sovereign state: United Kingdom
- Post town: Portsmouth
- Postcode district: PO2, PO3
- Dialling code: 023
- Police: Hampshire and Isle of Wight
- Fire: Hampshire and Isle of Wight
- Ambulance: South Central
- UK Parliament: Portsmouth North

Hilsea is a district of the city of Portsmouth in the English county of Hampshire. Hilsea is home to one of Portsmouth's main sports and leisure facilities – the Mountbatten centre. Trafalgar School (formerly the City of Portsmouth Boys' School) is also in Hilsea. It is also the home of Portsmouth rugby football club and to Portsmouth Football Club's training ground.

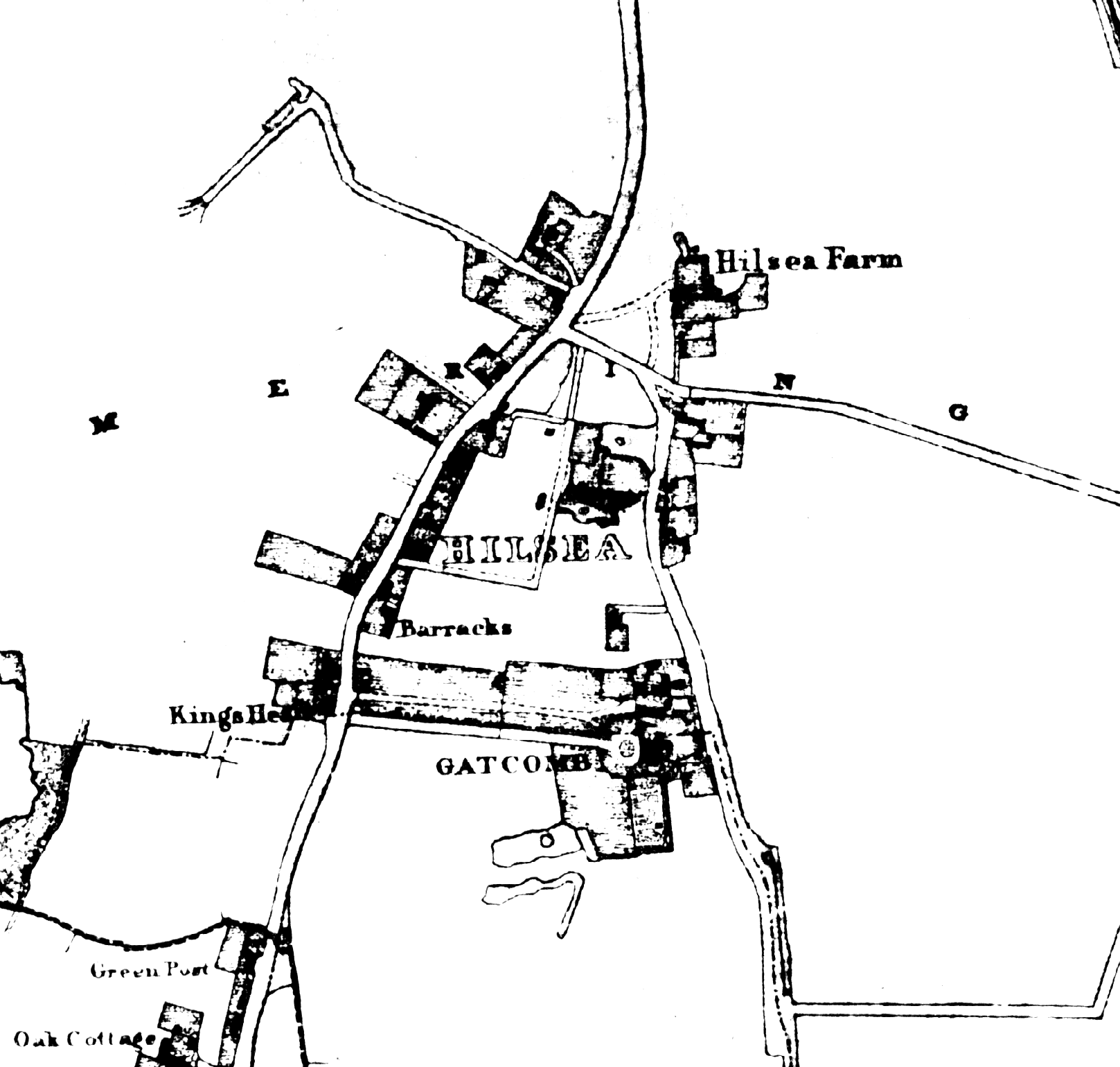
A map of Hilsea from 1833

Located at the Northern end of Portsea Island, for most of its history, Hilsea was a small hamlet on the Portsmouth to London road. The name "Hilsea" probably means 'holly island'. The boundaries of Portsmouth were not extended to encompass the hamlet until 1832. The last working farm in Portsmouth, Green Farm, was located in the area up to the 1990s. This area is now a residential estate and is marked by a pub and hotel, still known locally as the Green Farm, although its external sign bears only the name of the Toby Carvery chain which now owns it.

Construction of Hilsea Barracks started in 1780. Over the decades, they underwent various rebuildings and changes of use, before being knocked down to allow for housing development in the 1960s.

In the years after 1926, Hilsea expanded with the building of the Hilsea Crescent Estate, which was constructed on former allotments. The Church of England church of St Nicholas was built in the area between 1929 and 1930.

The North of the district composes the Hilsea Lines, former defensive fortifications that are now a nature reserve, known locally as Fox's Forest. In the 1930s, the Western end of the Lines moat became known as the Hilsea Lagoon and in the mid-1930s work was done on the banks and it was turned into a boating lake. In the same period, the land around the Eastern end of the boating lake was converted into Hilsea Bastion Gardens. Most of the gardens were destroyed as the result of road widening in 1968–70. The terraces that formed part of the gardens were demolished in 2000. In 1938, a bridge was built across the boating lake section of the moat. It was demolished in 1999 and later replaced by the current structure.

The area is home to the Coach & Horses pub. This was originally the first public house reached when arriving on Portsea Island from the mainland. It was damaged in a fire in 1870 and had to be rebuilt. It was again rebuilt between 1929 and 1931 to a design by A. E. Cogswell and this is the building that stands today. St Francis CofE church was built on Northern Parade in 1936.

Another facility in the area was the Hilsea Lido which opened in July 1935. A major renovation of the lido's main pool and surrounding area began in May 2024, led by Portsmouth City Council and funded by the UK government's Levelling Up Fund. The pool re-opened to the public on 2 May 2026.

The North West of Hilsea is protected from the sea by Stamshaw Esplanade which was built between 1936 and 1938. The Esplanade also serves to connect the site of Hilsea Lido with Alexandra Park. From 2015 and running until 2027, the coastline encompassing Stamshaw Esplanade, Ports Creek, and the Hilsea Lido site has undergone a major multi-phase upgrade as part of the North Portsea Coastal Scheme. Delivered by Coastal Partners on behalf of Portsmouth City Council and funded by the Environment Agency, the project significantly modernised the area's flood defenses while introducing improved shared walking and cycling routes, environmental landscaping, and supporting the regeneration of the Hilsea Lido facility.

In 1969 the area became home to local newspaper The News when it moved to The News Centre. The paper started to move out in 2013 and left entirely in 2020. The News Centre was purchased by First bus in 2023 who applied for planning permission to demolish in July the same year.

Modern Hilsea is a mixture of residential and industrial areas. One of the major routes into Portsmouth still runs through the area. In addition, a small halt called Hilsea railway station serves the area.

== Portsmouth Football Club training ground ==
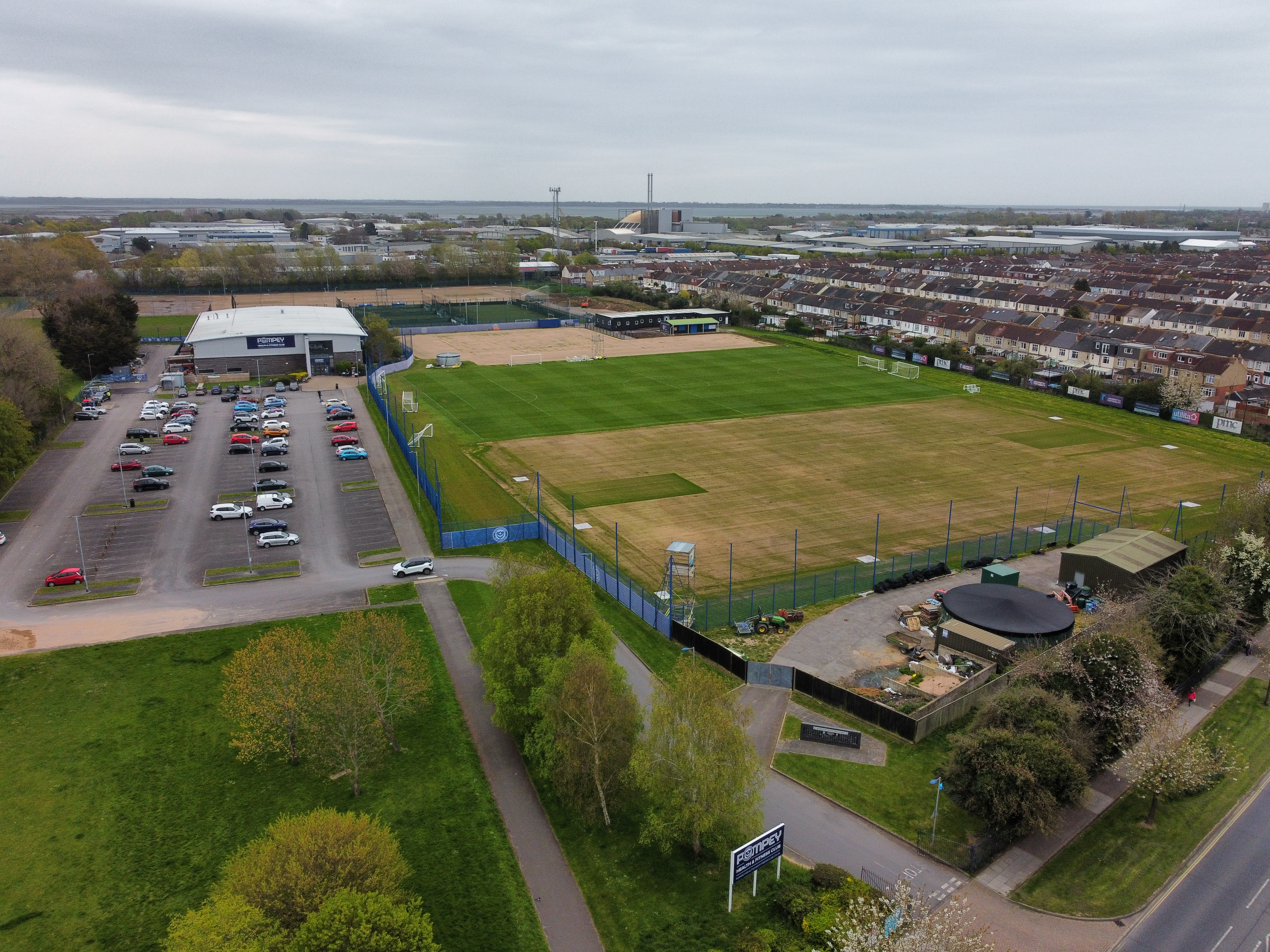
Portsmouth's training ground in Hilsea, Portsmouth

Portsmouth F.C. have been using their training ground at 442 Copnor Road (PO3 5EW) in the Hilsea area of Portsea Island since 2014. The facilities in Hilsea were formerly a ROKO health club until Portsmouth F.C. purchased them on 16 June 2021. The main ex-ROKO health club building has since been refurbished into 'Pompey Health And Fitness' members club, whose facilities are also used by Portsmouth F.C.'s squad.

== Portsmouth Airport & Anchorage Park ==
Between 1932–1973, the North-East corner of Hilsea was previously the location of Portsmouth Airport, and was one of the last remaining commercial grass runway airports in the United Kingdom. The airport offered little scope for expansion and, following some near-miss accidents with larger Hawker Siddeley 748 aircraft in the 1960s, the airport was restricted to small aircraft from then on, was uneconomic and closed in 1973. During the 1980s, the former airport land was redeveloped into an industrial area and a housing estate now known as Anchorage Park.
