= Walter H. Thompson =

British police officer and bodyguard of Winston Churchill (1890-1978)

Detective Inspector Walter H. Thompson BEM
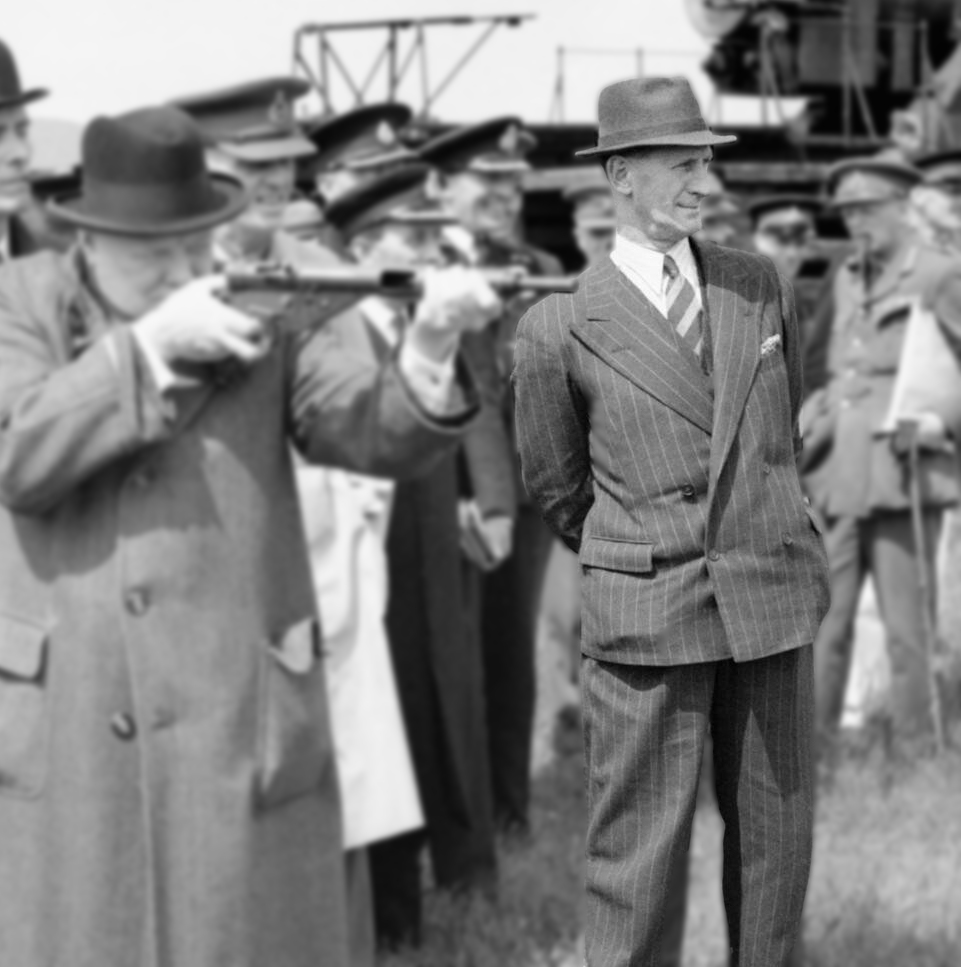
- Walter Thompson next to Winston Churchill testing a Sten Gun, 1941.
- Born: 3 December 1890; Brixton, London, England
- Died: 18 January 1978 (aged 87); Yeovil, Somerset, England
- Police career
- Allegiance: United Kingdom
- Department: Metropolitan Police Service
- Status: Retired
- Rank: 1913 entered special branch; 1935 Detective Inspector
- Badge no.: PC 549
- Awards: British Empire Medal (1943)
- Other work: Grocer; Writer

Detective Inspector Walter Henry Thompson BEM (3 December 1890 – 18 January 1978) was a British police officer who is best known as the bodyguard of Winston Churchill for eighteen years, between 1921 and 1935, and between 1939 and 1945 during World War II. Thompson reportedly saved Churchill's life on numerous occasions. When he finally retired after the war, he published a memoir that made him famous in the United Kingdom and the Western world.

== Early life and career ==
Thompson grew up in the working-class neighbourhood of Brixton in south London. One of a family of thirteen children, he was employed in a number of jobs before becoming a PC in Bayswater. He initially operated out of the Paddington Green Police Station. When the suffragette movement gained momentum, the police expanded the Special Branch. Thompson took the admission test and passed. He later became part of a large Special Branch surveillance operation on the suffragettes, during which he got to know most of the women's rights leaders. He eventually moved on to tracking anarchists, communists and other foreign threats before he moved to the protection detail.

== Protection detail ==
When it was discovered that terrorists intended to kidnap government ministers, Detective Constable Thompson was assigned to Winston Churchill as his bodyguard. He occupied that function on and off between 1921 and 1932 until his initial retirement in 1935.

During his time with Churchill, Thompson travelled over 200,000 miles and is reported to have saved Churchill's life on some 20 occasions, including times when Churchill's own foolhardiness exposed him to danger from shrapnel during the Blitz, plots by the IRA, Indian nationalists, Arab nationalists, Nazi agents, Greek Communists and the deranged. The stress of his duties during his time with Churchill caused Thompson to suffer a breakdown, which took him away from Churchill, but within weeks, Thompson had recuperated and returned to his duties.

Thompson was so liked by Churchill that when Thompson's daughter fell ill, Churchill arranged for her to be attended to by his own doctor and insisted that the invoice be sent to him for payment. The stress of the job, compounded by long absences away from his family, led to the dissolution of Thompson's first marriage in 1929; during long hours waiting around whilst Churchill was in meetings, he grew close to and eventually married Churchill's junior secretary, Mary Shearburn.

While working at a grocer's shop he had bought with his family, on 22 August 1939 he received a telegram that called him back into service as Churchill's bodyguard. The telegram from Churchill read "Meet me Croydon Airport 4.30 pm Wednesday." Although at that time Churchill had no official position in government, as the leading anti-appeaser he was aware of the prevailing risk to his life from assassins (particularly the Nazis) and engaged Thompson to protect him in the pay of £5 per week (£283 in 2025). On the same day, Thompson resumed his official duties with Scotland Yard, when Churchill rejoined the Cabinet on the outbreak of war.

He was with Churchill so much that he was a "perpetual annoyance" to Churchill's wife, Clementine. For his service protecting Churchill and his country, Thompson was awarded the British Empire Medal in the 1943 Birthday Honours by George VI. Thompson unexpectedly resigned as Churchill's bodyguard and from Scotland Yard duties following VE Day celebrations in May 1945. Churchill's gratitude to Thompson was evident when he presented him with his own personal cheque to reward the man who kept him safe during the war years and he graciously extended an open invitation for him to visit "when and wherever I am."

== Retirement ==
In June 1945, with Churchill out of office and Thompson about to retire for a second time from the Metropolitan Police, the Commissioner of the Metropolitan Police and Downing Street decided that it would be improper for him to publish his memoirs for the foreseeable future and threatened Thompson with the loss of his police pension if it was published, even though he had nearly completed a 350,000-word manuscript. An expurgated version, I was Churchill's Shadow was published in the 1950s.

After his book was published he became quite famous and embarked on a book tour across the UK. When the American version of his book was released in America he did over 400 lectures with his wife and made a number of TV appearances on shows like To Tell the Truth, an American TV game show where he beat the panel and won $300 (US$3,606 in 2025).

Thompson died of cancer on 18 January 1978 in Yeovil, Somerset, aged 87 years.

After Thompson's death, his great-niece, Linda Stoker, discovered the full memoir manuscript inside a suitcase in a Somerset farmhouse loft.

== In media ==
- Thompson, Walter H. (1938). Guard from the Yard (1938 ed.). Jarrolds. - Total pages: 255
- Thompson, Walter H. (1951). I was Churchill's Shadow (1951 ed.). C. Johnson. - Total pages: 200
- Thompson, Walter H. (1953). Sixty Minutes with Winston Churchill (1953 ed.). C. Johnson. - Total pages: 92
- Thompson, Walter H. (2003). Beside the Bulldog: The Intimate Memoirs of Churchill's Bodyguard (2003 ed.). Apollo Limited Publishing. ISBN 9780954522308. - Total pages: 144
- In 2005 13-part television series, on UKTV History, with Dennis Waterman reciting excerpts from Thompson's journal (originally broadcast between November and December 2005). On DVD, the documentary series is entitled Churchill's Bodyguard.

== Bibliography ==
=== Works cited ===
- Hickman, Tom (2006). Churchill's Bodyguard (2006 ed.). Headline Publishing Group. ISBN 9780755314492. - Total pages: 312
- Moynahan, Brian (30 October 2005). "Guarding the bulldog". The Sunday Times. Archived from the original on 4 March 2016.
- Roberts, A. (2018). Churchill: Walking with Destiny. Penguin Books Limited. ISBN 978-0-241-20564-8.
