= Trafalgar School, Portsmouth =

Trafalgar School

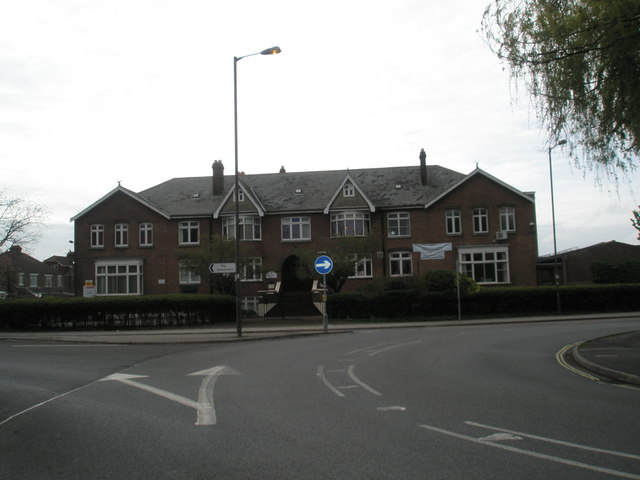

Location
- London Road; Portsmouth, Hampshire, PO2 9RJ; England; 50.831°N 1.071°W

Information
- Type: Academy
- Established: 1905
- Local authority: Portsmouth
- Department for Education URN: 141875 Tables
- Ofsted: Reports
- Headteacher: Claire Copland
- Gender: Coeducational
- Age: 10 to 16
- Houses: Temeraire, Sovereign, Britannia and Victory
- Colours: Green, Red, Blue and Purple
- Website: http://www.trafalgarschool.org.uk/

Trafalgar School (formerly City of Portsmouth Boys' School) is a coeducational secondary school located in Portsmouth, Hampshire, England. The school is on London Road in the Portsmouth northern sub district of Hilsea. The current comprehensive school, established in 1975, was the product of an amalgamation of four separate secondary schools in the west of the City of Portsmouth. Formerly a boys' school, the school became coeducational in September 2015.

== History ==
The school has existed in various forms since 1905. The original main campus building consisted of a red brick three-floor complex surrounding an inner grass quadrangle or 'quad'. This square complex forms the oldest part of the school today, facing London road. It is currently used for the administration, history and computer departments, as well as the library. In 1944 the school became a technical college, second in the tier of the three school system (above secondary modern status and below Grammar). It was named the Portsmouth Technical High School and retained this title until 1975. Under the tripartite system of the Butler Education Act, the school was expanded beyond the original main square complex.

In 1974 the school switched to the comprehensive system and the school was rebuilt in its present form that exists today. Until 1984 the school had occupied premises on two sites, the Main Campus off London Road, Hilsea (previously the Technical High School) and the Lower School in Doyle Avenue (previously Hilsea Modern School). The new building, consisting of mainly pre-fabricated materials and glass, more than doubled the size of the school. The original 'quad' building was incorporated into a new glass and concrete complex, that included a five-floor tower containing the English and Science departments. Other new buildings included new dining facilities, a new modern sports complex with two Gyms and a new main hall and auditorium (which contains the school's trophies and plaques dating to the school's formation). The technology department was established a few years later and extended away from the school. At this time, the City of Portsmouth Boys' School also developed its own Combined Cadet Force as well as securing land to double the school sports field.

In the mid-1980s the technology department was extended with a new building above for the new school art department. In 1988 the City of Portsmouth Boys' School was again extended. A new music department and a new food technology department were constructed to the side of the 'main' quad building and science tower. After the education act of 1996 the school chose to become a grant maintained status school, investing financial authority in the school governors. In 1999 the school had saved enough money to build a new maths department separate from the main school complex and consisting of eight new classrooms. The old maths department, housed in temporary facilities since the 1950s was demolished.

The school is currently still a comprehensive but acquired Foundation status, giving extra grants to science, engineering, maths and technology facilities. The engineering department of the school achieved "specialist status", which was funded through a £45,000 donation from BAE Systems to help renovate the classrooms, facilities and computer access.

Recent additions to the school building include a new security system and fence which encompasses the entire school facility as well as a keycard entrance system for pupils and teachers.

In February 2007, the school hosted a design competition in which a design was chosen for a statue of the Victorian era engineer, Isambard Kingdom Brunel. The carbon-coated stainless steel sculpture was built at HMS Sultan in Gosport and was unveiled in March 2013 in St George's Square, Portsea. The school has also taken part in charity events. A tutor in 2007 donated over £1000 to Cancer Research UK by putting on a charity variety show, named '9DXC and Friends Charity Variety Show'. It involved many teachers and the students of the before mentioned tutor group(9DXC).

In April 2015 the school converted to academy status and was renamed Trafalgar School. In September 2015 the school began accepting girls as pupils, meaning that the school became coeducational.

== Notable former pupils ==
- John Cameron (Auctioneer and TV personality) 1982–86
- Raji James (Raji Jhanji) (Film and TV actor, night club promoter) 1982–86
- Haji Mnoga (Footballer for Portsmouth FC)

=== Portsmouth Technical High School ===
- Joe Jackson (musician)
- Ray Shulman (musician)
- Keith Viney (footballer)
