= Churchill's Bodyguard =

- Directed by: Jonathan Martin; Philip Nugus
- Narrated by: Robert Powell
- Country of origin: United Kingdom
- Original language: English
- No. of series: 1
- No. of episodes: 13

Original release
- Network: Fremantle Media; Netflix
- Release: November 21, 2005

Churchill's Bodyguard (2005) is a 13-episode British television documentary series chronicling Winston Churchill's bodyguard, Walter H. Thompson (voiced by Dennis Waterman), who guarded him throughout his career. The series is based on Walter Thompson's memoir, which he wrote as a British police officer who was Churchill's personal bodyguard for 18 years. The series was created by the producers of Hitler's Bodyguard, and narrated by Robert Powell.

== See also ==
- Hitler's Bodyguard (TV series), a 13-part documentary with the same directors and narrator
