= Hitler's Bodyguard (TV series) =

- Directed by: Jonathan Martin; Philip Nugus
- Narrated by: Robert Powell
- Country of origin: United Kingdom
- Original language: English
- No. of series: 1
- No. of episodes: 13

Original release
- Network: Fremantle Media; Netflix

Hitler's Bodyguard (2008–09) is a 13-episode British television documentary series chronicling Adolf Hitler's loyal bodyguard personnel who guarded him throughout his career. The series contains reenactments and first-person accounts of the multiple assassination attempts Hitler faced. The series was created by the producers of Churchill's Bodyguard.

The series notes that Hitler required a large number of bodyguards compared to Winston Churchill who only had few. The show was added to Netflix in Australia and New Zealand on 28 February 2017. It is also on Amazon Prime Video.
