= Hilsea Lido =

Outdoor swimming pool in Portsmouth, England

- The refurbished Lido in April 2026
- Interactive map of Hilsea Lido
- Location: Hilsea Lido, London Road, Portsmouth, Hampshire, PO2 9RP
- Coordinates: 50.836269°N 1.075255°W
- Owner: Portsmouth City Council
- Operator: Sea Lanes Brighton and South Downs Leisure
- Type: open-air, freshwater
- Dimensions: Length: 67 metres (220 ft); Width: 18 metres (59 ft); Depth: 4.6 metres (15 ft)

Construction
- Opened: 1935
- Closed: 2008-2014, 2024-25

Website
- Official website

Hilsea Lido is a freshwater lido at Hilsea, Portsmouth, England, which originally opened in 1935. The pool reopened on 2 May 2026 after an extensive £7.6m refurbishment.

The aim of the refurbishment project was to ensure the future of the Hilsea Lido by renovating the pool and encourage further investment and regeneration of the area. The project was enabled by funding from the UK government.

== Description ==
The Hilsea Lido is a leisure facility featuring a cold water main pool measuring 67m x 18m. It was originally 4.6 metres (15 feet) deep, meaning the lido had the distinction of being the deepest outdoor pool in the UK apart from Broomhill Pool which is the same depth.

The depth has now been reduced to 2.6m as part of the stabilisation work to counteract the pressure of the groundwater pushing the pool tank up from below.

A large splash pool (45m x 18m x 6ins deep) designed for younger swimmers used to be adjacent to the main pool. This has now been replaced by the Hilsea Jubilee Splash Pool.

The site of the lido is connected to Alexandra Park via the Stamshaw Esplanade.

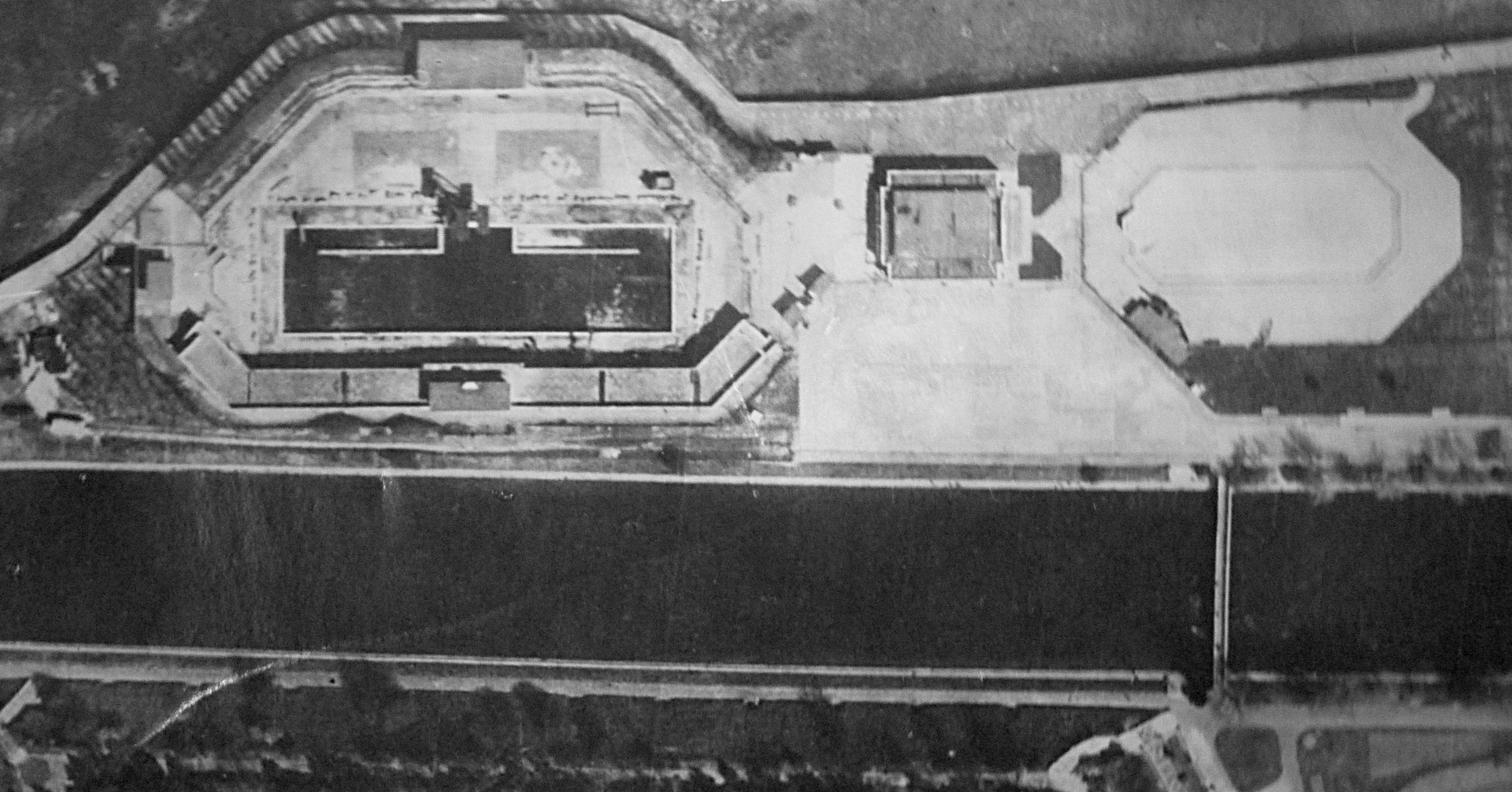
Hilsea Lido seen from the air in 1947

== Development ==
Plans for development of the lido were agreed in 1932 and the lido opened on 24 July 1935. The architect for the lido was Joseph Parkin. The pool originally used seawater, converting later to freshwater, and the lido design included two large fountains The main pool and changing facilities were designed for the use of 768 adults and 180 children, with accommodation for around 1000 spectators.

== History ==
In 1936 the Lido was visited by the British diving team from 1936 Summer Olympics who gave a demonstration on 31 August. During World War II the main pool was closed to the general public and was given over to the use of the various military units in the area. Between 1946 and 1951 a miniature railway ran along the lido site.. In the 1970s, the lido's diving platforms were removed.

In 1988, Hilsea Lido faced a major threat when plans were considered that would turn the site into a commercial complex, including a cinema, hotels, nightclub, ice rink and a bowling alley. A local resident, Chris Davis, formed the Hilsea Environment and Lido Preservation Group (HELP), which launched a “Hands Off the Lido” campaign. Over 500 people joined demonstrations, which led to the plans being scrapped.

Clipping from The News Portsmouth, reporting on the 1988 'Hands off Hilsea Lido' campaign

In 2006 plans for refurbishing the lido were abandoned by the council, however extended campaigning by residents continued and in 2009 a management trust was established with charitable status. In 2010 Hilsea Lido Pool for the People acquired the lido and adjoining Blue Lagoon building on a 99-year lease from Portsmouth City Council. The lido was open for viewing on 19 September 2009 for the Heritage Open Days.

In June 2012 ,Sport England gave Hilsea Lido Pool For The People a £50,000 grant towards the cost of restoring the pool. The money was used to refurbish the pool's pumps and fit new lockers and showers.

In the winter of 2010-11 the splash pool was damaged by freezing conditions. In April 2011 Portsmouth City Council decided to replace the pool with a new design featuring two pools. The new design was named the Hilsea Jubilee Splash Pool and was completed in 2012 at a cost of £332,000.

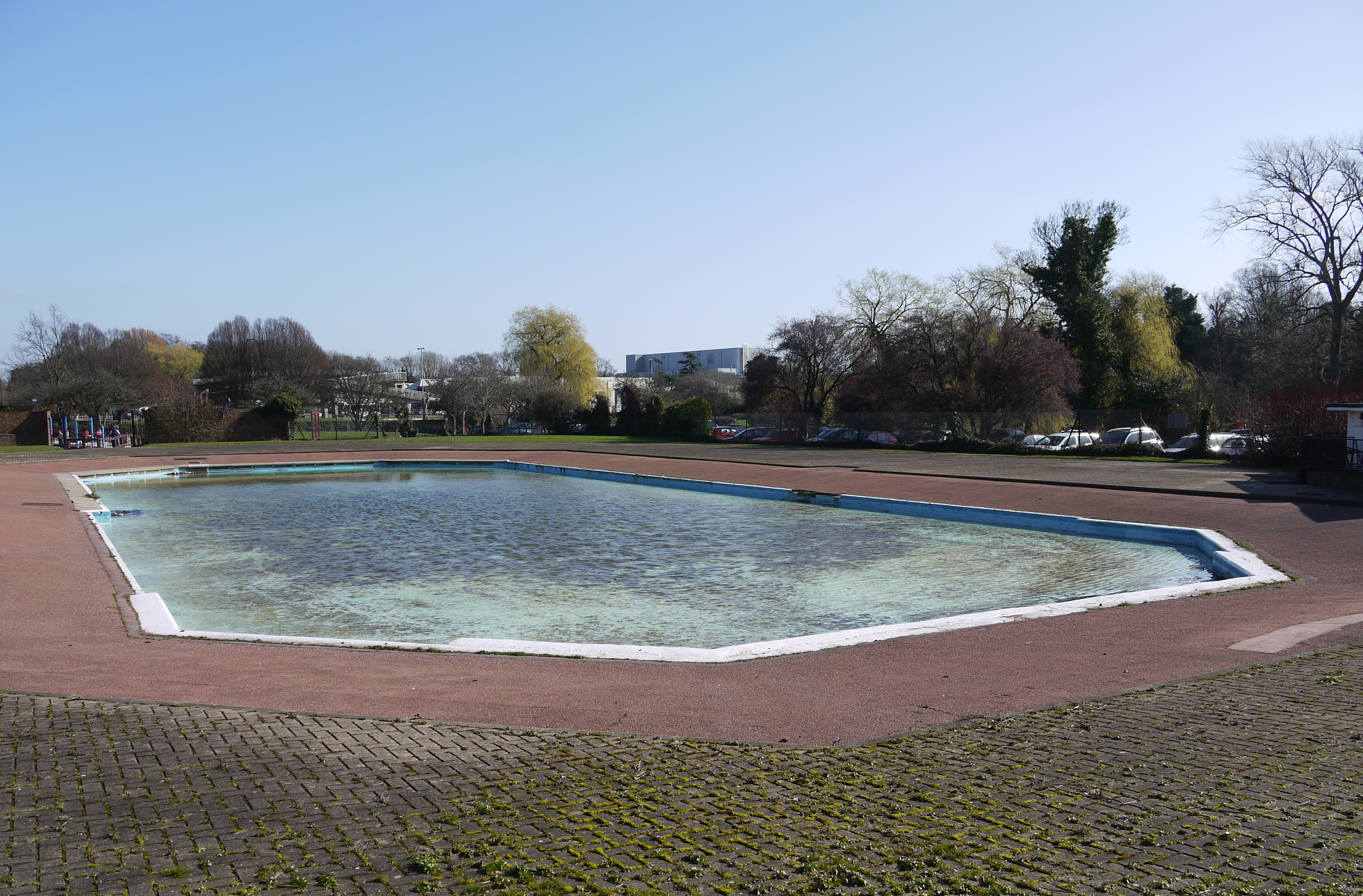
The Lido's former splash pool

In 2014, Portsmouth North MP Penny Mordaunt appeared on the reality TV show Splash! in order to raise funds for the lido. She donated her appearance towards improvement work at the site.

In 2022, the lido was forced to remain closed due to a combination of technical issues resulting from aging equipment, and the need for refurbishment. This marked the beginning of a closure period that would last until renovation work was completed in April 2026.

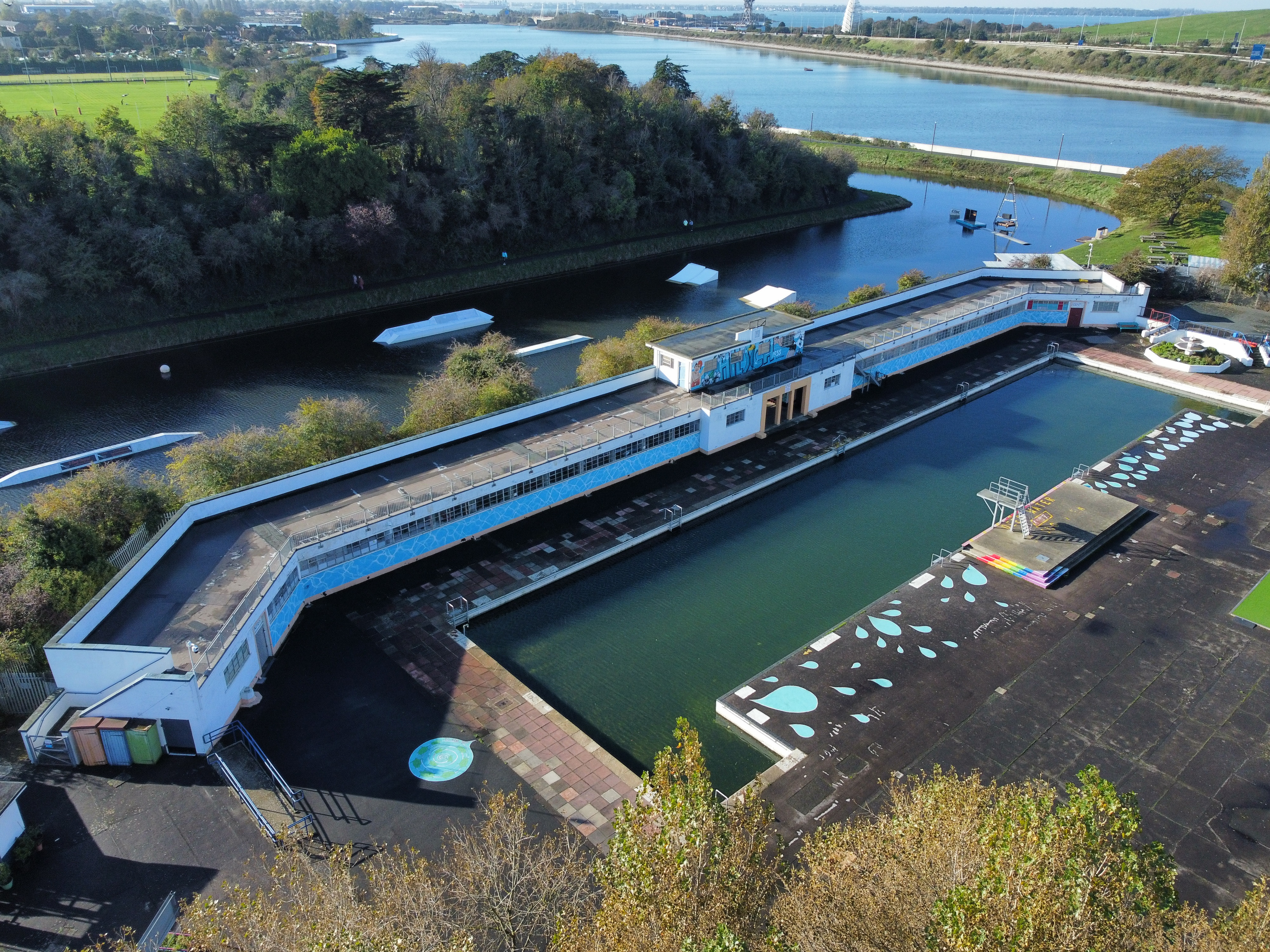
Hilsea Lido in 2022 whilst the site was closed

Historic England issued a Certificate of Immunity from Listing in May 2024, guaranteeing that the building would not be statutorily listed within the next five years.

== Renovation ==
A major renovation of the lido's main pool and surrounding area began in May 2024, led by Portsmouth City Council and funded by the UK government's Levelling Up Fund.

The start of renovation work at Hilsea Lido in 2024

The plant room was refurbished, the old pool equipment cleared away, and replaced with a new, modern filtration system. The pool base was stabilised with 80 tonnes of steel reinforcing and 30 lorry loads of concrete and the original lagoons on the north side the pool have been restored. Modular toilets and shower units have been installed, including a Changing Places toilet.

In July 2025, it was announced the team behind Sea Lanes Brighton, supported by South Downs Leisure, would operate the lido's main pool and the neighbouring splash pool, once the renovation work was complete.

The pool re-opened to the public on 2 May 2026. The operators will look at further regeneration of the wider site, including the buildings around the lido, in the next phase of their plans.

== Cultural references ==
In 1974 the Lido was used as a set for the Bernie's Holiday Camp scene in Ken Russell's rock opera film Tommy, based on the album by The Who. The scene features Oliver Reed as Frank Hobbs and Ann-Margret as Nora Walker.

In 1995 Hilsea Lido lent its name to the Vulcan Software management simulation game Hillsea Lido.
