= Broomhill Pool =

Swimming pool in Ipswich, Suffolk, England

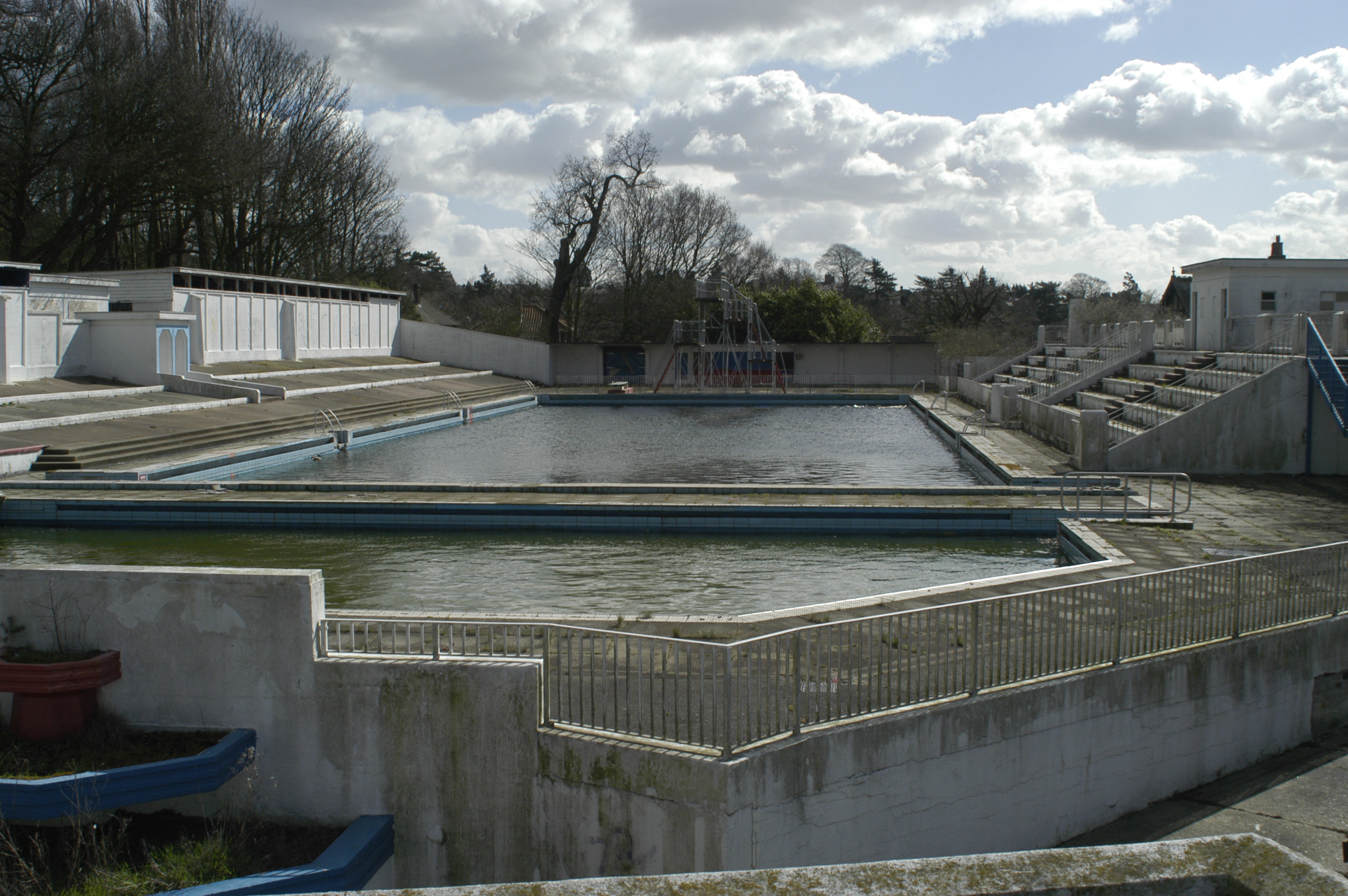
- Interactive map of Broomhill Pool
- Location: Sherrington Road, Ipswich
- Coordinates: 52.06834°N 1.141071°E
- Owner: Ipswich Borough Council
- Dimensions: Length: 165 feet (50 m); Width: 60 feet (18 m)

Construction
- Opened: 1938
- Closed: 2002
- Architect: E. McLauchlan

Website
- The Broomhill Pool Trust

Broomhill Pool is a Grade II listed lido on Sherrington Road in Ipswich, Suffolk, England.

== Status ==
Broomhill Pool opened on 30 April 1938 and closed in the autumn of 2002. The pool is the deepest lido in Britain (jointly with Hilsea Lido) at 15ft deep. At 55 yards x 20 yards and 8 lanes wide, the pool volume is 464,000 gallons/2.1 million litres of water.

The lido was built in 1938 for £17,000 by the County-Borough of Ipswich. It was designed by E. McLauchlan, the County-Borough Engineer and Surveyor.

Broomhill Pool became a Grade II listed building on 23 August 2001.

The lido is built within Broomhill Park. It is close to Broomhill Library which was built in 1942 as a WW2 bomb-proof decontamination unit. Broomhill Library was Grade II listed in 2012. English Heritage highlighted the "Group value: the relationship between the former gas decontamination centre and the adjacent Broomhill lido holds important group value; the style of the decontamination centre was designed to mirror the facade of the adjacent Broomhill Lido (listed at Grade II), and both were designed by Borough Engineer E. McLauchlan."

Broomhill Pool is a founding member of Historic Pools of Britain: "Established in 2015, Historic Pools of Britain is the first body ever to represent historic swimming pools in this country. These unique indoor and outdoor pools make a significant contribution to the social and architectural history of Britain and play a hugely important role in our communities."

Janet Smith wrote in her definitive book, "Liquid Assets" (Published 2005): "Broomhill may lack the national profile accorded to Saltdean, Tinside or Penzance, but it is arguably their equal in architectural significance."

== Proposed restoration ==
The Broomhill Pool Trust is a registered charity (No.1102659) which aims to restore Broomhill Pool; the last remaining Olympic length, grade II listed lido in Suffolk & Norfolk for full public use.

In December 2017, Fusion Lifestyle secured Heritage Lottery Funding stage 2 full grant of £3.4m. Fusion will invest over £2m. In August 2018 Ipswich Borough Council increased their commitment to £1.5m to secure the scheme.

The £7.25m restoration commenced in 2020 and the pool was due to reopen in 2021, however this was delayed and the project now faced a shortfall in funding.

In January 2024, a funding deal was finally struck between stakeholders Ipswich Borough Council, National Lottery Heritage Fund and Fusion Lifestyle. The restoration is now looking toward completion in 2026.

On 12 December 2024, the restoration project's plans were approved by Ipswich Borough Council's planning department.

However, in 2026, Fusion Lifestyle entered administration, and now a new start and a new operator is needed to secure the restoration and re-open the Lido. Ipswich Borough Council declared their intentions late in October 2026 of pursuing options to do this.
