= Tommy (1975 film) =

1975 film by Ken Russell

- Theatrical release poster
- Directed by: Ken Russell
- Screenplay by: Ken Russell
- Based on: Tommy (1969 album) by the Who
- Produced by: Robert Stigwood; Ken Russell
- Starring: Oliver Reed; Ann-Margret; Roger Daltrey; Elton John; Eric Clapton; John Entwistle; Keith Moon; Paul Nicholas; Jack Nicholson; Robert Powell; Pete Townshend; Tina Turner
- Cinematography: Dick Bush; Ronnie Taylor
- Edited by: Stuart Baird
- Music by: The Who
- Production companies: Robert Stigwood Organization Ltd.; Hemdale Film Corporation
- Distributed by: Hemdale Film Corporation
- Release dates: 19 March 1975 (United States); 26 March 1975 (United Kingdom)
- Running time: 108 minutes
- Country: United Kingdom
- Language: English
- Budget: $3 million
- Box office: $34.5 million

Tommy is a 1975 British musical surrealist fantasy drama film written, co-produced, and directed by Ken Russell, based on the Who's 1969 rock opera album about a psychosomatically deaf, mute, and blind boy who becomes a pinball champion and religious leader. The film featured an ensemble cast, including the members of the Who themselves (most notably, its lead singer, Roger Daltrey, who plays the title role), Oliver Reed, Ann-Margret, Elton John, Eric Clapton, Jack Nicholson, Robert Powell, and Tina Turner.

An independent production by Russell and Robert Stigwood, Tommy was released in the United States on 19 March 1975 by Columbia Pictures and in the United Kingdom on 26 March 1975 by Hemdale Film Corporation. The film was shown at the 1975 Cannes Film Festival, but was not entered into the main competition.

Ann-Margret received a Golden Globe Award for her performance and was also nominated for the Academy Award for Best Actress. Pete Townshend was also nominated for an Oscar for his work in scoring and adapting the music for the film. In 1975, the film won the award for Rock Movie of the Year in the First Annual Rock Music Awards.

== Plot ==
In the prologue, set in 1945, a montage displays the honeymoon of Group Captain Walker and his wife, Nora ("Prologue - 1945"). After his leave ends, Walker goes off to fight in World War II as a bomber pilot, but is shot down during a mission. "Captain Walker" is listed as missing in action and is presumed dead, although—unknown to his family—the badly burned Walker is still alive. Back in England, Nora goes into labour and gives birth to a son, Tommy, on V-E Day ("Captain Walker/It's a Boy"). Five years later, in 1950, Nora begins a new relationship with Frank, a holiday worker she and Tommy meet at a holiday camp. Tommy looks up to his "Uncle" Frank and expresses his desire to run his own holiday camp some day ("Bernie's Holiday Camp"). On New Year's Eve, Nora and Frank dream of their future ("1951 / What About the Boy?"), but, late that evening, the returning Captain Walker surprises the couple in bed, leading to a struggle where Frank kills the Captain. (Note: In the original album synopsis, the Captain kills Frank.) Realising that Tommy has witnessed the murder through the reflection of a mirror, the couple coerce Tommy into believing he did not see or hear anything and will tell no one. The heat of the moment panics Tommy into a dissociative state where he outwardly appears "deaf, dumb, and blind", though internally he finds himself experiencing the world through a psychedelia-like state ("Amazing Journey"). Later, at a Christmas party, Nora is distressed that Tommy "doesn't know what day it is" ("Christmas").

Over 16 years, Nora and Frank make several fruitless attempts to bring the now older Tommy out of his state, taking him to a faith healer ("Eyesight to the Blind") and a drug dealer ("The Acid Queen"). They become increasingly lethargic at the lack of effect, place him with some questionable babysitters ("Cousin Kevin" / "Fiddle About") and eventually leave Tommy standing at the mirror one night, allowing him to wander off. He follows a vision of himself to a junkyard pinball machine ("Sparks") and begins to play. Tommy is recognised by Frank and the media as a pinball prodigy ("Extra, Extra, Extra"), which is made even more impressive with his sensory-impaired state. During a championship game, Tommy faces The Champ ("Pinball Wizard") with the Who as the backing band. Nora watches her son's televised victory and celebrates his (and her) success and luxury, but finds she can't fully enjoy it because of Tommy's extreme condition ("Champagne").

Frank finds a specialist for Tommy ("There's a Doctor") who concludes that Tommy's senses are functioning but blocked by an internal issue and explains the only hope is to continue having Tommy face his reflection ("Go to the Mirror!"). An increasingly frustrated Nora promptly throws Tommy through the mirror ("Smash the Mirror!") causing him to snap to full consciousness ("I'm Free"). Tommy reveals that his experiences have transformed him and decides that he wants to transform the world ("Mother and Son" / "Miracle Cure").

Tommy goes on lecture tours that resemble glam-rock gospel shows and spreads a message of enlightenment by hang glider, gaining friends and followers everywhere he goes ("Sally Simpson" / "Sensation"). Tommy and a more enlightened and elated Nora and Frank welcome converts to their house, which quickly becomes too crowded to accommodate everyone. Tommy opens an extension for his religious campus ("Welcome" / "Tommy's Holiday Camp").

The converts, confused about Tommy's odd practices and his family's commercial exploitation of the compound, wrathfully demand Tommy teach them something useful. Tommy does so, artificially deafening, muting, and blinding everyone, only to inadvertently provoke a riot. The followers kill Nora and Frank and destroy the camp in a fire ("We're Not Gonna Take It"). Tommy finds his parents in the debris and mourns before escaping into the mountains from the beginning of the film. He ascends the same peak where his parents celebrated their honeymoon, celebrating the rising sun ("See Me, Feel Me").

== Cast ==
- Oliver Reed as "Uncle" Frank Hobbs, Nora's brute boyfriend with a (subtle) soft side
- Ann-Margret as Nora Walker, Tommy's mother who is obsessed with glamour and luxury but who also has a deep love for her son
- Roger Daltrey as Tommy Walker, a catatonic man who develops messianic delusions
  - Barry Winch as young Tommy and Alison Dowling as young Tommy's singing voice
- Elton John as The Champ, (Note: Erroneously credited as "The Pinball Wizard") the cocky pinball champion of the world in four-and-a-half-foot high boots
- Eric Clapton as The Preacher, the leader of a Marilyn Monroe–themed cult
- Arthur Brown as The Priest, a manic assistant to The Preacher
- John Entwistle, Pete Townshend and Keith Moon as themselves as the Who during "Eyesight to the Blind", "Pinball Wizard" and "Sally Simpson"
  - Townshend also acts as Narrator during "Amazing Journey", "Sally Simpson" and "Sensation".
    - Townshend's brother, Simon Townshend, narrates during the "Extra, Extra, Extra" interludes.
  - Moon also acts as Uncle Ernie, Frank's clownish perverted pimp friend.
- Paul Nicholas as Cousin Kevin, Tommy's sadomasochist relative with a biker punk aesthetic
- Jack Nicholson as Dr A. Quackson, the Specialist, a doctor who helps in curing Tommy and who enchants Nora
- Robert Powell as Group Captain Walker, Nora's Royal Air Force pilot late husband
- Tina Turner as The Acid Queen, an erratic prostitute who deals in prophetic LSD
- Victoria Russell as Sally Simpson, a Tommy fan girl who sneaks to a concert and gets maimed
- Ben Aris as Rev. A. Simpson V. C. and Mary Holland as Mrs. Simpson, Sally's conservative, religious parents

Uncredited

- Imogen Claire as the Specialist's nurse
- Jennifer and Susan Baker as the nurses during "It's a Boy"
- Juliet and Gillian King as the Acid Queen's handmaidens

Director Ken Russell makes an uncredited cameo appearance, as one of the Preacher's followers and eventually one of Tommy's. He is seen in a wheelchair.

== Development ==
Tommy was written in 1968 and recorded by the Who in 1969. Three years later a version of the opera was recorded by the London Symphony Orchestra. The two albums sold ten million copies between them.

Film rights were bought by Robert Stigwood who secured financing from Columbia. Beryl Vertue of the Stigwood Organisation was executive producer. Stigwood also arranged for Ken Russell to direct. Russell admitted he did not like the music – he disliked rock music in general – but he loved the theme of the film, being about a messiah.

According to Russell, several scripts had been written by the time he came on the project. He later wrote, "Some were well written, some were not, but they all had one thing in common—a big negative. They were not about a deaf, dumb and blind boy's spiritual journey from darkness to light." Russell did up his own treatment of the story as he saw it. He said: "This in no way deviated from [Townshend's] original, but plugged in the gaps where I found the story obscure, or just plain non-existent." Russell said Townshend liked most of his suggestions and wrote new material.

== Production ==
=== Writing ===
Russell and Townshend worked on the film together for a year. Russell had been working on a script called The Angels, which was to star Mia Farrow as a pop star called Poppy Day who becomes a messianic figure, and reworked some of that script's sequences for Tommy. He also used scenes from another unfilmed script of his, Music, Music, Music, about a composer who writes music for TV commercials (this turned into what became known as the "baked beans" scene with Ann-Margret). Russell made several changes to the story:

- In the original story, Tommy's father returns and murders the lover. In the film, the father is the murder victim.
- Both Tommy's mother and lover are complicit in the murder.
- The story's setting is shifted forward, so that the finale takes place in the mid-1970s (present-day when the film was released). The song "1921" is changed to "1951" to accommodate this.

=== Casting ===
It was announced that Roger Daltrey would play Tommy and Keith Moon would play Uncle Ernie. Various rumours spread over who would play other characters with names such as David Bowie, Elton John, Barbra Streisand and Mick Jagger being mentioned.

Daltrey was cast at Russell's specific request, over the wishes of Daltrey's own management.

In December, it was announced Ann-Margret would play Tommy's mother. Ann-Margret was cast because, according to Russell, "I needed a superb singer."

Jagger was reportedly offered the role of The Acid Queen but insisted on singing three of his own songs, so the role was given to Tina Turner.

Jack Nicholson agreed to play a small role because "Russell's films intrigue me, some I like very much, some I don't like at all, and I want to find out what makes them tick." Russell originally considered Peter Sellers for the role of The Specialist.

Russell says Pete Townshend wanted Tiny Tim to play Pinball Wizard but Stigwood overruled him. Elton John initially turned down the role of the Pinball Wizard and among those considered to replace him was David Essex, who recorded a test audio version of the "Pinball Wizard" song. However, producer Robert Stigwood held out until John agreed to take the part, reportedly on condition that he could keep the gigantic Dr. Martens boots he wore in the scene. John later wore the boots in a brief scene in the music video for his song "Nikita", which was directed by Russell.

=== Filming ===
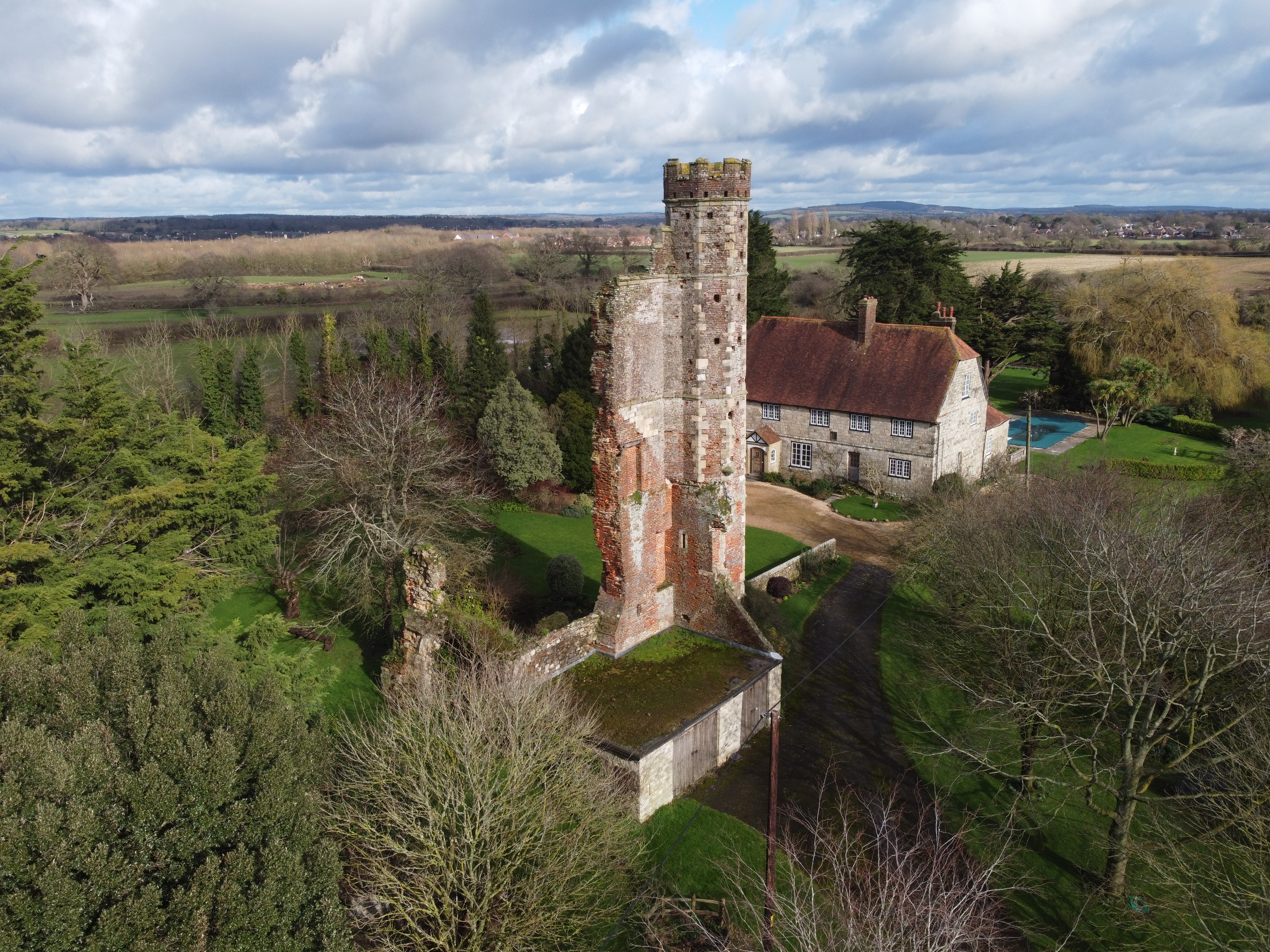
Warblington Castle, where Tommy hang glides

Filming started April 1974 and took place over twelve weeks. In his commentary for the 2004 DVD release of the film, Ken Russell stated that the opening and closing outdoor scenes were shot in the Borrowdale valley of the English Lake District, near his own home, the same area that he had used to double for rural Austria and Bohemia in his earlier film Mahler, in which Robert Powell had starred.

Much of the film was shot on locations around Portsmouth, including the scene near the end of the film featuring the giant "pinballs", which were, in fact, obsolete buoys found in a British Navy yard that were simply sprayed silver and filmed in situ. The Bernie's Holiday Camp ballroom sequence was shot inside the Gaiety Theatre on South Parade Pier. Exterior shots were filmed at Hilsea Lido (Russell had worked there before making The Boy Friend). The Sally Simpson interior sequence was filmed in the Wesley Hall in Fratton Road, Portsmouth. The exterior intro sequence to the scene, however, shows Sally Simpson buying a badge and entering South Parade Pier.

On 11 June 1974, the pier caught fire and was badly damaged while the production was filming there. According to Russell, the fire started during the filming of the scene of Ann-Margret and Oliver Reed dancing together during the "Bernie's Holiday Camp" sequence; smoke from the fire can be seen drifting in front of the camera in several shots. Russell also used a brief exterior shot of the building fully ablaze during the scenes of the destruction of Tommy's Holiday Camp by his disillusioned followers. Tommy's camp itself was filmed at Fort Purbrook.

The Pinball Wizard sequence was shot at the Kings Theatre in Southsea. The two pinball machines used were 1965 Gottlieb models: a "Kings & Queens" played by Roger Daltrey, and a "Buckaroo" played by Elton John. The machines' score counters were modified from their originals to allow larger scores. Other locations on Portsdown Hill, which overlooks Portsmouth, and local churches were used. All Saints in Commercial Road was used for the Sally Simpson wedding scene, whilst the meeting in the same sequence was filmed at the Wesley Hall in Fratton Road. The Eyesight to the Blind sequence was filmed at St Andrews Church in Henderson Road in Southsea. The other church featured was Warblington Church near Havant in Hampshire.

The famous scene in which Ann-Margret's character hallucinates that she is cavorting in detergent foam, baked beans, and chocolate reportedly took three days to shoot. According to Russell, the detergent and baked bean sequences were "revenge" parodies of real-life TV advertisements he had directed early in his career, although the baked bean sequence also references one of the cover photos and a parody radio ad from the Who's 1967 album The Who Sell Out. Russell also recalled that Ann-Margret's husband, Roger Smith, strongly objected to the scene in which she slithers around in melted chocolate.

During the filming, Ann-Margret accidentally struck her hand on the broken glass of the TV screen, causing a severe laceration, and Russell had to take her to hospital to have the wound stitched, although she was back on set the next day. The film also includes a scene in which Mrs. Walker watches a parodic TV advertisement for the fictional product "Rex Baked Beans"; the costumes in this segment were originally made for the lavish masked ball sequence in Richard Lester's version of The Three Musketeers, and the dress worn by the Queen in the Rex ad is that worn by Geraldine Chaplin in the earlier film.

Russell recalled that Townshend initially baulked at Russell's wish to have the Who performing behind Elton in the "Pinball Wizard" sequence (they did not perform the audio there), and also objected to wearing the pound-note suits, which were in fact stitched together from novelty pound-note tea-towels. As for the Who's involvement with the film, Daltrey played the title character; Moon played, in essence, a dual role as both Uncle Ernie and as himself along with Entwistle and Townshend miming on their respective instruments in the "Eyesight to the Blind" and "Pinball Wizard" segments. About his role as the Specialist, Jack Nicholson stated: "In my whole career there was only one time when a director said to me, 'OK, come right down the pike and just look beautiful, Jack.' That was Ken Russell on Tommy."

Filming finished in September 1974. Russell then edited the film and supervised the recording of the soundtrack. When it was done, Russell said: "I think it's probably the one thing I've ever done that satisfies me aesthetically. The fact that it's a rock opera as well is a tremendous bonus because people will come see it."

== Reception ==
=== Box office ===
The film was a box-office hit. By August 1975, it had earned US$27 million (equivalent to $122 million in 2024) in the US alone.

The film made over US$1 million (equivalent to $5 million in 2024) in France.

Russell later called it "the most commercial film I've ever made".

=== Critical response ===
On the review aggregator website Rotten Tomatoes, the film holds an approval rating of 71% based on 93 reviews. The website's critics consensus reads, "Tommy is as erratic and propulsive as a game of pinball, incorporating the Who's songs into an irreverent odyssey with the visual imagination that only director Ken Russell can conjure."

Vincent Canby of The New York Times declared: "It may be the most overproduced movie ever made, but there is wit and reason for this. It is the last word in pop art ... Everything, including the sound level, is too much. But even this works in an odd way. The victim of the movie is as much the person sitting in the audience as it is Tommy." Variety called the film "spectacular in every way ... The production is magnificent, the multitrack sound (tradenamed Quintaphonic) terrific, the casting and acting great, and the name cameos most showmanly."

Roger Ebert gave the film three stars out of four, commenting that its message is confused and hypocritical, but that its focus is on well-executed, grandiose spectacles rather than any pretense at meaning. He called the pinball tournament sequence "the movie's best single scene: a pulsating, orgiastic turn-on edited with the precision of a machine gun burst." Gene Siskel of the Chicago Tribune awarded Tommy two-and-a-half stars out of four, calling the film "a disappointing, slap-dash pictorialization of the fine music of the Who [with] no cinematic flow."

Charles Champlin of the Los Angeles Times called the film "an overwhelming, thunderous, almost continuously astonishing achievement, coherent and consistent from first frames to last." Gary Arnold of The Washington Post wrote that the music of the original album: "...had a certain obscure dignity and integrity, and these qualities don't withstand the Russell treatment. On record Tommy seemed a bit mysterious. On screen it's just banal." Jonathan Rosenbaum of The Monthly Film Bulletin wrote that "even at its most lacklustre and tasteless junctures, Tommy is never boring, and always full of energy; and given the very loose framework and imprecise plot that Russell has to work with, this is no small achievement."

In a retrospective review, Perry Seibert of AllMovie gave the film four stars out of five and described it as "continuously watchable, but the film version of Tommy sacrifices the fragile emotional core of Pete Townshend's work for grandiose spectacle."

=== Accolades ===
Award	Category	Nominee(s)	Result
Academy Awards	Best Actress	Ann-Margret	Nominated
Academy Awards	Best Scoring: Original Song Score and Adaptation or Scoring: Adaptation	Pete Townshend	Nominated
Golden Globe Awards	Best Motion Picture – Musical or Comedy		Nominated
Golden Globe Awards	Best Actress in a Motion Picture – Musical or Comedy	Ann-Margret	Won
Golden Globe Awards	Best Acting Debut in a Motion Picture – Male	Roger Daltrey	Nominated
Palić European Film Festival	Aleksandar Lifka Award	Ken Russell	Won
Turkish Film Critics Association Awards	Best Foreign Film		9th Place

== Quintaphonic Sound ==
The original release of Tommy used a sound system devised by sound engineer John Mosely called "Quintaphonic Sound". At the time that the film was in production, various "Quadraphonic" (four-speaker) sound systems were being marketed to the domestic HiFi market. Some of these were so-called matrix systems that combined the four original channels into two, which could be recorded on or transmitted by, existing two-channel stereo systems such as LP records or FM radio. John Mosely used one of these systems (QS Regular Matrix from Sansui) to record front left, front right, back left, and back right channels on the left and right tracks of a four-track magnetic striped print of the Cinemascope type. A discrete centre channel was also recorded on the centre track of the print. The fourth (surround) track on the striped print was left unused. In addition, John Mosely used dbx noise reduction on the magnetic tracks.

Unlike the usual multiple small surround speakers used in cinemas, the Quintaphonic system specified just two rear speakers, but of the same type as those used at the front.

One problem that arose was that by the 1970s the four-track magnetic sound system was largely moribund. Only a few theatres were equipped with the necessary magnetic playback heads and other equipment; of those that did in many cases, it was not in working order. Thus, in addition to installing the extra electronics and rear speakers, John Mosely and his team had to repair and align the basic magnetic playback equipment. Each theatre that showed Tommy using the Quintaphonic system accordingly had to be specially prepared to take the film. In this respect there is a similarity between Tommy and Walt Disney's Fantasia, for which a special sound system (Fantasound) had been devised and required each theatre that showed it in the original release to be specially prepared. Also, like Fantasound, Quintaphonic Sound was never used again (five-channel audio, in the form of 5.1 surround sound, eventually made a comeback).

Tommy was later released with mono, conventional four-track magnetic and Dolby Stereo soundtracks.

The Quintaphonic Sound mix was restored for the DVD and Blu-ray release of the film.

== Changes from the album ==
Unlike some other filmed rock operas (such as the only partially re-recorded soundtrack of Pink Floyd's The Wall), the album is never dubbed over the film. All the songs were rerecorded featuring the film's cast – including Nicholson and Reed, neither of whom were known for their singing ability (Reed's character's songs were cut from Oliver!, and Nicholson's in On a Clear Day You Can See Forever appeared only in the now-lost roadshow version) – performing the songs in character. Of the Who, Daltrey performs as Tommy, Moon performs as Uncle Ernie, and Townshend sings narration in place of recitative.

The song order is shuffled around considerably; this and the addition of several new songs and links creates a more balanced structure of alternating short and long sequences. A large number of songs have new lyrics and instrumentation, and another notable feature is that many of the songs and pieces used on the film soundtrack are alternate versions or mixes from the versions on the soundtrack album.

=== Differences between 1969 and 1975 versions ===
- The film opens with a new instrumental, "Prologue–1945" (partly based on the 1969 "Overture"), which accompanies the opening sequences of Captain Walker's romance and disappearance.
- "It's a Boy" is separated from "Overture" and becomes the medley "Captain Walker/It's A Boy"; in the film this medley narrates the aftermath of Walker's disappearance, the end of the war and the birth of Tommy.
- A new song, "Bernie's Holiday Camp", which follows "Captain Walker/It's a Boy", portrays Tommy's childhood and his mother's romance with Hobbs (Oliver Reed). The song also features the melody from, and even foreshadows, "Tommy's Holiday Camp".
- The story's setting is updated so that the action goes through modern times (modern as of the 1970s). From this, the track "1921" from the album is changed to "1951" and is made a medley, being titled "What About the Boy?" on the soundtrack, in which Capt. Walker dies instead of the lover (Frank, in this context).
- "The Amazing Journey" (shortened to three minutes) has almost completely different lyrics, and the "guide" from the album is depicted as Tommy's dead father, rather than the "tall stranger" in a "sparked, glittering gown" from the album. A new introduction is also added in lieu of the "Deaf, dumb, and blind boy/he's in a quiet vibration land..." from the album. The movie version also ends with different fantastic lyrics, "His eyes are the eyes that transmit all he knows/The truth burns so bright it can melt winter snows/A towering shadow, so black and so high/A white sun burning the earth and the sky".
- The running order of "Christmas" and "Eyesight to the Blind" is reversed; references to pinball are removed from "Christmas" and the character of The Hawker becomes The Preacher (Clapton), leader of the Marilyn Monroe cult. Arthur Brown is cast as the character The Priest in the film, and sings a verse in the song but is not featured on the soundtrack. According to Russell's DVD audio commentary, the concept of people literally worshipping celebrities (in this case Marilyn Monroe) and several other elements in the film were adapted from his pre-existing treatment for a film about false religions, which he had developed prior to Tommy but for which he had never been able to secure financial backing.
- The running order of "The Acid Queen" and "Cousin Kevin" is reversed.
- "Underture" is removed but parts from it have been re-arranged as "Sparks".
- "Cousin Kevin", "Fiddle About", and "Sparks", linked by three renditions of "Do You Think It's Alright?" form an extended sequence depicting Tommy's inner journey and his trials.
- A three-minute version of the "Sparks" theme (with, then new, synthesizer orchestration) precedes "Extra, Extra, Extra" and "Pinball Wizard". In the film, it is used behind the sequence of the dazed Tommy wandering into a junkyard and discovering a pinball machine. The music on the film soundtrack (for this and many other songs) is heavily edited, however, and is a noticeably different mix from the version on the soundtrack album.
- A new linking theme, "Extra, Extra, Extra", narrates Tommy's rise to fame and introduces the battle with the pinball champ. It is set to the tune of "Miracle Cure" and precedes "Pinball Wizard".
- "Pinball Wizard" has extra lyrics and movements. It features guitar and keyboard solos (the guitars are only readily discernible on the soundtrack album), and an outro with a riff reminiscent of the Who's first single, "I Can't Explain".
- A new song, "Champagne", which follows "Pinball Wizard", covers the sequence of Tommy's stardom and wealth and his parents' greed. Like many other songs, it features Tommy singing "See Me, Feel Me" interludes: this is the first song with Daltrey singing for Tommy. In the film (but not on the soundtrack), the song is introduced by a mock TV commercial—reminiscent of the Who's early years when they made jingles.
- "Go to the Mirror" is shortened, not featuring the elements of "Listening To You", nor the phrase "Go to the mirror, boy."
- "I'm Free" is moved earlier, and now follows "Smash The Mirror!" (as was done on the 1972 symphonic album); it covers the lavish psychedelic sequence depicting Tommy's reawakening.
- "I'm Free" is followed by a new song, "Mother and Son", which depicts Tommy's rejection of materialism and his vision for a new faith based around pinball.
- "Sensation", featuring extra lyrics, is moved forward and covers the spread of Tommy's new religion. In the film it occurs between "Sally Simpson" and "Welcome". (On the soundtrack album, it occurs between "Mother and Son" and "Miracle Cure"—with the extra [narration] lyrics and guitar solo included on the cassette and CD versions, but not the LP version.)
- "Sally Simpson" is re-arranged with a Bo Diddley beat and in the film is preceded by "Miracle Cure"—which features an extra verse.
- In "Sally Simpson", the album version mentions her father's Rolls-Royce as blue, but the film changes the lyrics to black (the Rolls-Royce in the film is also black).
- In "Sally Simpson", the album version describes Tommy giving a lesson. In the film, Tommy gives a lesson, and the lyrics are changed to the words of the lesson.
- In the album version of "Sally Simpson", the title character jumps on the stage and brushes Tommy's cheek, but in the movie she is kicked off the stage before she can get close to Tommy.
- A new linking piece, "T.V. Studio", is used between "Welcome" and "Tommy's Holiday Camp".
- The 1969 album's closing track "We're Not Gonna Take It" is split into two pieces, "We're Not Gonna Take It" and medley "See Me Feel Me/Listening To You"; this covers the climactic film sequences of Tommy's fall from grace and his final redemption and opens with an extra chorus sung by the crowd ("These pricey deals don't teach us...").
- The CD reissue of the soundtrack album opens with a version "Overture From Tommy" previously released on a vinyl single in 1975, but not included either in the film or on the original soundtrack LP. Although the track is listed in the CD's song credits as being performed by the Who, it is actually a Pete Townshend solo number with him playing all the instruments (as with "Prologue – 1945" and other tracks)—neither John Entwistle or Keith Moon appear on it, as they do on all other selections on the soundtrack credited to "The Who," regardless of whether Roger Daltrey performs as vocalist.

== See also ==
- List of cult films
