= Robert Powell =

British actor

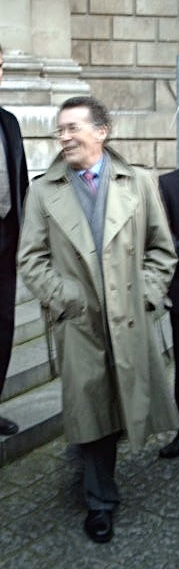
- Powell at St Paul's Cathedral in 2006
- Born: Robert Thomas Powell; 1 June 1944 (age 82); Salford, Lancashire, England
- Education: University of Manchester
- Occupation: Actor
- Years active: 1966–present
- Spouse: Barbara Lord (m. 1975)
- Children: 2

Robert Thomas Powell (/ˈpaʊəl/ POW-əl; born 1 June 1944) is an English actor who is known for the title roles in Mahler (1974) and Jesus of Nazareth (1977), and for his portrayal of secret agent Richard Hannay in The Thirty Nine Steps (1978) and its subsequent spinoff television series. Other major screen roles have included Tobias "Toby" Wren in the BBC science-fiction programme Doomwatch (1970), David Briggs in the sitcom The Detectives (1993–1997) with Jasper Carrott, and Mark Williams in the medical drama Holby City (2005–2011).

Powell, with his distinctive voice, has become well known as a narrator of documentaries, especially those concerning the Second World War, including World War II in HD Colour, Hitler's Bodyguard, The Story of the Third Reich and Secrets of World War II.

Powell was nominated for a Best Actor BAFTA TV Award for Jesus of Nazareth in 1978 and won a Best Actor award at the Venice Film Festival for his performance in the film Imperative in 1982.

== Early life ==
Powell was born in Salford, Lancashire, the son of Kathleen (née Davis) and John Wilson Powell. He was educated at Manchester Grammar School (which was then a direct grant grammar school), and studied law at the University of Manchester. He has an elder brother.

== Career ==
Powell began acting at school, playing the title role in Shakespeare's King Lear. He also appeared as a teenager in The Adventures of Samuel Poppleton on BBC Radio Children's Hour from the North of England in Manchester, where he came under the guidance of producer Trevor Hill, as detailed in Hill's autobiography, Over the Airwaves. He secured a post at a repertory theatre in Stoke-on-Trent. His first film part was in Robbery (1967), which starred Stanley Baker and was about the Great Train Robbery, in which he played the second man or locomotive driver's assistant. He had a small role in the original film version of The Italian Job (1969) playing one of the gang, but had to wait a few years for his first success, playing scientist Toby Wren in the BBC's science fiction series Doomwatch in 1970.

Having been killed off in Doomwatch right at the end of Series One in a bomb explosion, at his request, Powell became a pin-up and a household name, following up with starring roles in several BBC serials, including television adaptations of the novels Sentimental Education (1970) and Jude the Obscure (1971). In 1972–1973 he portrayed Charles Rolls in the miniseries The Edwardians. He starred in 1973 in the first episode of the British series Thriller. He also appeared in the 1975 series Looking for Clancy, based on the Frederic Mullally novel Clancy. For several years Powell continued as a television regular, with occasional forays into film, as the Austrian composer Gustav Mahler in the Ken Russell biopic Mahler (1974) and Captain Walker in Russell's film version of Tommy (1975). His role in Tommy had few lines, speaking only during the overture with Ann-Margret, he is primarily seen through the mind of his son as played by Barry Winch (Young Tommy) and Roger Daltrey.

Powell then played the title role in Jesus of Nazareth (1977) following a successful second audition with Franco Zeffirelli. The four-part television film had an all-star cast, including Laurence Olivier as Nicodemus, Ernest Borgnine as the Roman Centurion, Stacy Keach as Barabbas, Christopher Plummer as Herod Antipas, Michael York as John the Baptist, Ian McShane as Judas Iscariot, Rod Steiger as Pontius Pilate and James Mason as Joseph of Arimathea. For this role, Powell was nominated for a BAFTA award, and collected the TVTimes Best Actor award for the same performance. His completist performance is frequently considered one of the best portrayals of Christ.

In 1978, Powell took the leading role of Richard Hannay in the third film version of The Thirty Nine Steps. It met with modest success, and critics compared Powell's portrayal of John Buchan's character favourably with those of his predecessors. His characterisation proved to be enduring, for almost ten years later a television series titled simply Hannay appeared, with Powell back in the role (although the Buchan short stories on which the series was based were set in an earlier period than The Thirty-Nine Steps). Hannay ran for two seasons. In 1980, Powell appeared in the film Harlequin playing the Harlequin of the title, who seems to have the power to cure the son of a powerful politician. For this performance he won the Best Actor Award at the Paris Film Festival. In 1982, he won Best Actor at the Venice Film Festival for his role in Imperativ.

In 1984, Powell made his U.S. film debut in What Waits Below (also known as Secrets of the Phantom Caverns). In 1986, Powell narrated and co-starred in William C. Faure's miniseries Shaka Zulu, with Henry Cele in the title role. In 1992, he starred in the New Zealand First World War film Chunuk Bair, as Sgt. Maj. Frank Smith. In 1993–95, he was the voice actor of Dr Livesey in The Legends of Treasure Island. Powell then agreed to a request from his friend and golf partner, comedian Jasper Carrott, taking the part of an incompetent detective in a succession of sketches that formed part of Carrott's television series. The Detectives proved to be popular and was later turned into a sitcom, Powell's first and only venture into that genre.

Powell's distinctive voice is frequently heard on voice-overs and as a narrator of television programmes such as Great Crimes and Trials, The Century of Warfare and World War II in HD Colour. He read the novel Love in the Time of Cholera by Gabriel García Márquez for BBC Radio 4's Book at Bedtime, and has also narrated many audio books, including The Thirty Nine Steps, abridged versions of many of Alan Garner's books, and several abridged novels for The Talking Classics Collection. Powell has also lent his voice to musical works, such as David Bedford's album The Rime of the Ancient Mariner, or the 2002 rock opera The Hound of the Baskervilles, by Clive Nolan and Oliver Wakeman, in which he played the role of John Watson. He also narrated on two rock albums by Rick Wakeman called Cost of Living and The Gospels (1987).

On 29 October 2001, a state-of-the-art theatre named after him was opened at the University of Salford. He became a patron of 24:7 Theatre Festival in 2004, and continues to operate in this capacity. In early 2005 he became a regular in the UK TV medical drama, Holby City, where he remained for six years before departing to return to theatre. In 2005, Powell began appearing in the BBC soap opera Holby City as a hospital administrator. He said that regular employment in the series helped him make up financial losses caused by the failure of the pension fund he held with The Equitable Life Assurance Society. On 9 February 2008, he performed as narrator in Prokofiev's Peter and the Wolf with the Huddersfield Philharmonic Orchestra with conductor Natalia Luis-Bassa in the North of England. In 2008–09, Powell was series announcer (19 episodes) on BBC4's The Book Quiz.

In September 2015, Powell starred as the title role in the Almeida Theatre production of Mike Bartlett's future history play King Charles III which opened at the Birmingham Repertory Theatre before touring the UK, followed by a season at the Sydney Theatre Company. On Easter Sunday 1 April 2018, Powell appeared in a Smithsonian Channel Documentary Series based on his portrayal of the Franco Zeffirelli mini-series Jesus of Nazareth titled, The Real Jesus of Nazareth, narrated by Judd Hirsch. Based in Israel, it covered the life of Jesus juxtaposed with segments of the television series in which Powell starred in 1977. The characters who appeared in the series are also discussed and their historical significance uncovered. The series covered 4 segments, each one hour in length dealing with historical elements of the story along with Powell interviewing biblical historians such as Helen Bond and Candida Moss. The 1977 series starring Powell differed in at least two scenes from the Gospel's historical account: in the film, the Virgin Mary is shown without the angel of the Annunciation and Jesus carries only the horizontal branch of the Holy Cross to Calvary.

== Personal life ==
Powell met his future wife, Pan's People dancer Barbara "Babs" Lord, backstage at the BBC. On 29 August 1975, shortly before he was due to start filming Jesus of Nazareth on location in Tunisia, the couple were married. On 23 November 1977 they had their son, followed in 1979 by a daughter.

The couple later took up sailing as a pastime. Babs Lord participated in the BT Global Yacht Challenge and the Polar race. Both took part, in different yachts, in a round-the-world race in 2000, though Powell himself was present for only one leg of the race.

Powell was a founder member of the Social Democratic Party in 1981, and campaigned alongside Barry Norman on behalf of the party's first leader, Roy Jenkins.

== Filmography ==
Filmography
Year	Title	Role	Notes
1967	Robbery	Second man on Locomotive	Uncredited
1967	Far from the Madding Crowd	Man at Harvest Dance	Uncredited
1969	The Italian Job	Yellow	
1969	Walk a Crooked Path	Mullvaney	
1971	Jude the Obscure	Jude Fawley	6 episodes
1971	Secrets	Allan Wood	
1972	Running Scared	Tom Betancourt	
1972	Shelley	Percy Bysshe Shelley	TV movie
1972	Asylum	Dr Martin	(segment "Mannikins of Horror")
1973	The Asphyx	Giles Cunningham	
1974	Mahler	Gustav Mahler	
1975	Tommy	Captain Walker	
1975	Looking for Clancy	Frank Clancy	5 episodes
1977	Jesus of Nazareth	Jesus Christ	4 episodes
1977	Beyond Good and Evil	Paul Rée	
1978	The Four Feathers	Jack Durrance	TV movie
1978	The Thirty Nine Steps	Richard Hannay	
1980	Harlequin	Gregory Wolfe	
1980	Jane Austen in Manhattan	Pierre	
1981	The Survivor	Keller	
1981	La chanson du mal aimé		
1982	The Hunchback of Notre Dame	Phoebus	TV movie
1982	Imperativ	Augustin	
1983	The Jigsaw Man	Jamie Fraser	
1983	Pygmalion	Higgins	TV movie
1984	What Waits Below	Rupert 'Wolf' Wolfsen	
1984	Frankenstein (1984)	Victor Frankenstein	TV movie
1985	D'Annunzio	Gabriele D'Annunzio	
1986	Shaka Zulu	Henry Fynn	10 episodes
1987	D'Annunzio	Gabriele D'Annunzio	
1988	Laggiù nella giungla	Paolo Kruger	
1988–1989	Hannay	Richard Hannay	13 episodes
1990	Romeo.Juliet	Romeo	Voice
1991	The First Circle	Gleb Nershin	TV movie
1991	Merlin of the Crystal Cave	Ambrosius, Merlin's father	5 episodes
1992	Long Conversation with a Bird	John Barth	TV movie
1992	Chunuk Bair	Sgt. Maj. Frank Smith	
1992	The Boer War	Narrator	Documentary
1993	The Mystery of Edwin Drood	Jasper	
1993	The Legends of Treasure Island	Dr Livesy	Voice, 8 episodes
1993–1997	The Detectives	Dave Briggs	31 episodes
1993	Remembering Titanic	Narrator	Documentary
1995–1996	Fantomcat	Fantomcat	Voice, 26 episodes
1997	Pride of Africa	David Webb	TV movie
2003	Hey Mr DJ	Jerome Jackson	
2004	The Alchemist of Happiness	Al-Ghazali	Voice, Documentary
2004	Agatha Christie's Marple	Dr. Haydock	Episode: "The Murder at the Vicarage"
2005	Dalziel and Pascoe	Barry Jemmerson	Episode: "Heads You Lose"
2005	Colour Me Kubrick	Robert	
2005	Churchill's Bodyguard	Narrator	Documentary
2005–2011	Holby City	Mark Williams	249 episodes
2006	B-Mail	The Pink Professor	Voice, Short
2007	The Forgotten Children of Congo	Narrator	Documentary
2008	Hitler's Bodyguard (TV series)	Narrator	Documentary
2009	World War II in HD Colour	Narrator	Documentary
2013	The Bible	Narrator (UK)	10 episodes
2017	The Real Jesus of Nazareth	Presenter / Narrator	Documentary
2020	Jazz Sabbath	Narrator	Documentary

== Other work ==
In 1995, Powell was one of the readers of Edward Lear poems on a specially made spoken word audio CD bringing together a collection of Lear's nonsense songs.

Powell provided the narration for Clive Nolan and Oliver Wakeman’s 2002 adaptation of The Hound of the Baskervilles as a progressive rock album.
