= The Forgotten Children of Congo =

- Directed by: Alex Tweddle
- Written by: Alex Tweddle
- Produced by: Alex Tweddle
- Narrated by: Robert Powell
- Cinematography: James Buck
- Edited by: Ian Chambers and Nick McCahearty
- Distributed by: The Film and Television Company (UK); The Film and Television Company (worldwide)
- Release date: July 2007 (United Kingdom)
- Running time: 48 minutes
- Country: United Kingdom
- Languages: French, Lingala, Swahili, English subtitles.

The Forgotten Children of Congo is a 2007 British documentary film written, produced and directed by Alex Tweddle for Angry Man Pictures Ltd.

== Background ==
The Forgotten Children of Congo was filmed over four weeks in the Democratic Republic of Congo. From the remoteness of the Congo Basin, to the capital Kinshasa and the volatile Ituri Province in the East, this documentary focuses on the plight of the country's street children.
