= Alexandra Park, Portsmouth =

Park in Portsmouth, England

Coordinates: 50.825762°N 1.080726°W

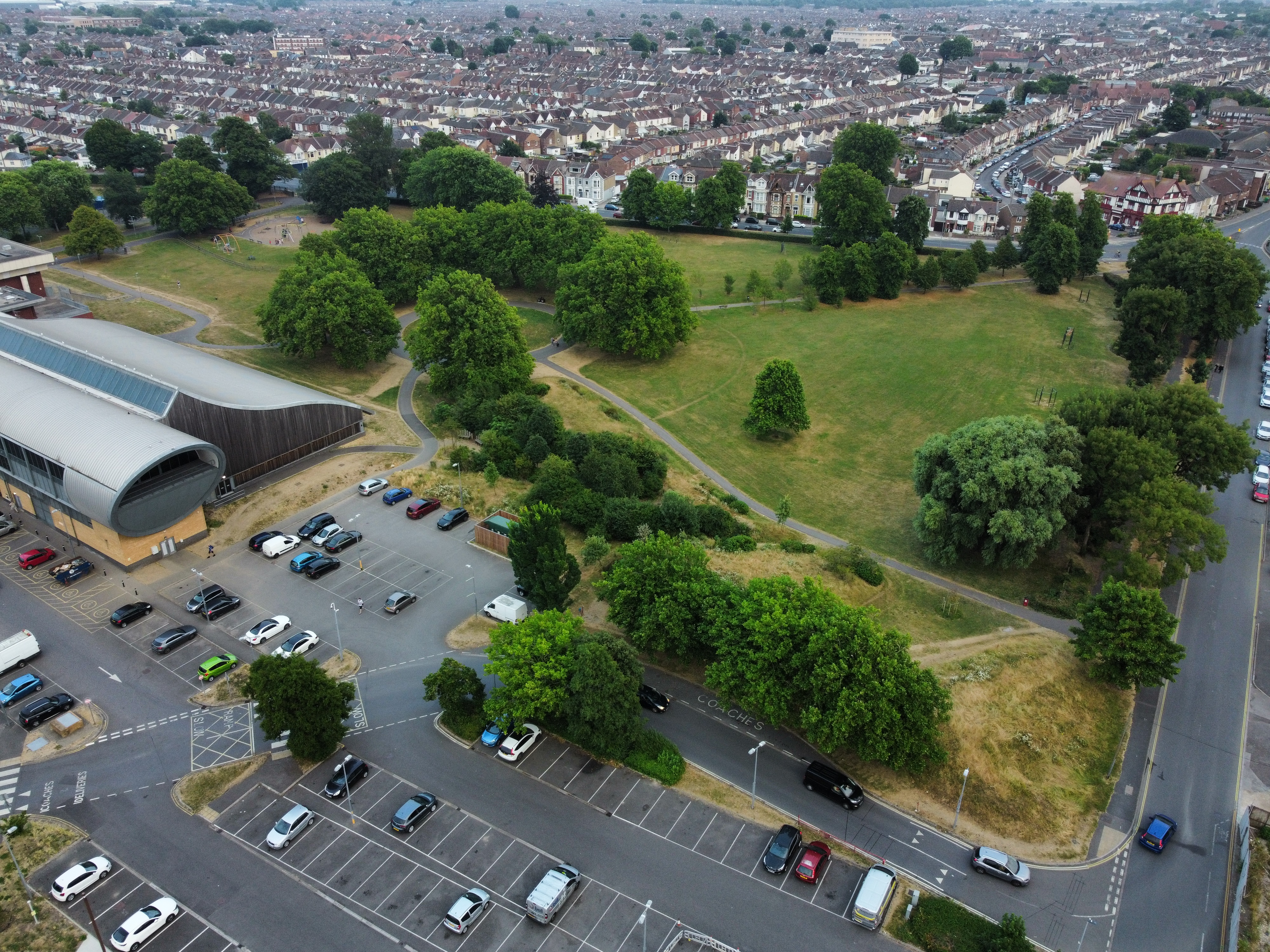
Aerial view of Alexandra Park

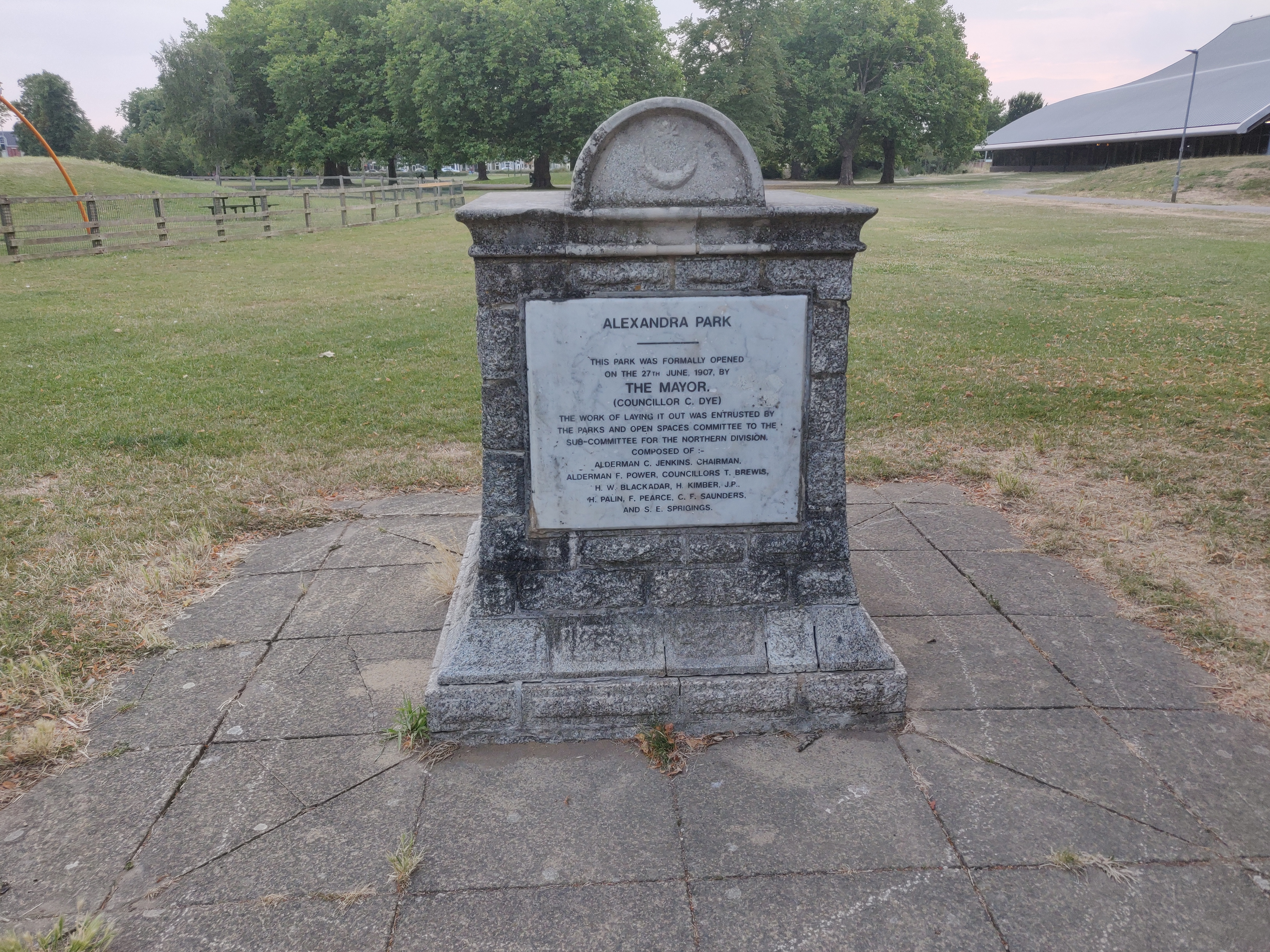
Memorial commemorating the opening of Alexandra Park

Alexandra Park, Portsmouth, was opened in 1907 and was a place of recreation for the people of Portsea Island. It provided lawns, flowers beds, paths and seats; it was an area to escape the toils of inner city life in the early twentieth century. The park was named after Queen Alexandra. At the time of the parks opening the site was already home to a bicycle track.

The park is still popular today, and plays host to the Mountbatten Sports Centre, a modern sports facility including a 50-metre swimming pool and athletics and cycle tracks. To the north of the park there are playing fields which host a number of sports including American football, cricket, hockey, football matches & motocross. The southern section of the park provides a children's play area, and retains its trees, flower, beds and lawns, and is an area for general recreation.

The Portsmouth Dreadnoughts American Football Team currently use Alexandra Park as their training ground as well as their home venue.

The park is connected to the site of the Hilsea Lido via the Stamshaw Esplanade.
