= Great Crimes and Trials =

- Genre: Documentary
- Created by: Philip Nugus and Johnathan Martin (Nugus/Martin Productions LTD)
- Starring: Robert Powell
- Country of origin: United Kingdom
- No. of series: 3
- No. of episodes: 78

Production
- Running time: 30 minutes

Original release
- Network: BBC2
- Release: 2 November 1993 – 17 July 1996

Great Crimes and Trials (sometimes titled Great Crimes and Trials of the Twentieth Century) is a 1993–1996 BBC documentary television series. The program uses archival material to reconstruct a renowned crime, examining the felon's motives, details of the crime, the investigations and the trial. Each episode is narrated by actor Robert Powell.

== Series 1 (1993) ==
Number	Episode	Notes
1	The Lindbergh Baby Kidnapping	
2	Lucky Luciano	
3	Al Capone	
4	Son of Sam	
5	The Hillside Stranglers	
6	John Dillinger – Public Enemy No. 1	
7	The Manson Family Murders	
8	The Jonestown Massacre	
9	The Green Beret Killings	
10	The Case of Dr. Sam Sheppard	
11	Neville Heath	
12	Ted Bundy	
13	Gary Gilmore	
14	The Trial of Adolf Eichmann	
15	John Gacy	
16	The Massacre of the Tsar and the Imperial family	
17	Dr. Crippen	
18	The Great Train Robbery	
19	The Boston Strangler	
20	Haigh the Acid Bath Murderer	
21	John Christie of Rillington Place	
22	The Black Panther	
23	Murph the Surf	
24	The Hammersmith Murders	
25	The McKay Kidnapping	
26	The Yorkshire Ripper	

== Series 2 (1994) ==
Number	Episode	Notes
1	Charles Starkweather	
2	Howard Hughes Biography Hoax	
3	Jean Harris	
4	The Kidnap of Patty Hearst	
5	Richard Speck	
6	Caryl Chessman	
7	Roberts, Duddy and Witney	
8	Jeremy Bamber	
9	Hitler and the Nuremberg Trials	
10	Stalin and the Massacre at Katyn Wood	
11	The Assassination of Gandhi	
12	The Assassination of Martin Luther King	
13	The Kennedy Assassination	
14	The A6 Murder	
15	Dennis Nilsen	
16	Charles Whitman	
17	US Brinks Robbery	
18	The Night Stalker	
19	The Rosenbergs	
20	Jimmy Hoffa	
21	Dan White	
22	Bonnie and Clyde	
23	Wayne Williams	
24	Alcatraz	Episode features the 1946 and 1962 escape attempts.
25	The Ku Klux Klan	
26	The New York Mafia Wars	

== Series 3 (1996) ==
Number	Episode	Notes
1	Mark Chapman and the Killing of John Lennon	
2	Gaston Dominici	
3	Henry Lee Lucas	
4	Donald Hume	
5	John Duffy	Episode made before revelation of Duffy's accomplice.
6	Graham Young	
7	Sir Harry Oakes	
8	Lord Haw-Haw	
9	DeFeo and Benson	
10	Donald Merrett	
11	Roy Fontaine	
12	Buck Ruxton	
13	Leonard Lake and Charles Ng	
14	John Bodkin Adams	
15	Heidnik and Dahmer	
16	Judge Joe Peel	
17	Sacco and Vanzetti	
18	The Trunk Murders	
19	Browne and Kennedy and other Police Killings	Episode also features the cases of Bentley and Craig and Guenther Podola.
20	The Siege of Sidney Street	
21	Leopold and Loeb	
22	The Zodiac Killer	Episode also features the cases of the San Diego serial murders, the New York Zodiac and the Green River Killer. Episode made before capture of both the New York Zodiac and the Green River Killer.
23	The Assassination of Robert Kennedy	
24	Pol Pot and the Killing Fields of Cambodia	
25	The Malmedy Massacre	
26	Ma Barker and Other Public Enemies	Episode also profiles the Barker–Karpis gang, Bonnie and Clyde, John Dillinger and Machine Gun Kelly.

== Broadcasting ==
The series was originally broadcast on Tuesday afternoons on BBC2 in the United Kingdom and in the United States on the A&E Network. In the mid-late 2000s the program was repeated on weekdays in the United Kingdom on the Crime & Investigation Network. The broadcast of the series began on Russian TV-6 channel in the fall 2000.

== The 2011 series ==
In 2011 the Investigation Discovery rebooted the series narrated by Alisdair Simpson, with infamous cases from the late 20th century and the early 21st century. The series aired one season with 26 episodes.

== Great Crimes and Trials (2011) ==
Number	Episode	Notes
1	Brisbane's Lesbian Vampire Killers	
2	Monster of Belgium	
3	The Case of Christopher Porco	
4	Murdered by the Mob	
5	The Crimes of Harold Shipman	
6	The Ken and Barbie Killers	
7	Murder of Sarah Payne	
8	Murder on Cape Cod	
9	The Australian Outback Killer	
10	A Very Dangerous Game	
11	The Kennedy Connection	
12	The Case of Amanda Knox	Murder of Meredith Kercher
13	Long Island Railroad Massacre	
14	Murder in the Mansion	
15	Murder on the Mountain	The murder of Rinette Bergna
16	The Case of Ray and Faye Copeland	
17	Beast of Notting Hill	The murder of Janie Shepherd
18	Beast of the Bastille	
19	The BTK Killer	
20	The Boogeyman	
21	Case of Susan Smith	
22	Case of Ward Weaver III	
23	The Railroad Killer	
24	The Case of Arthur Gary Bishop	
25	Terror in Gainesville	
26	Death of a Mail Order Bride	

== Book ==
Great Crimes and Trials of the Twentieth Century
- Author: Paul Begg and Martin Fido
- Language: English
- Genre: True crime
- Publisher: Carlton Books
- Publication date: December 1993
- Publication place: United Kingdom
- Media type: Print (Hardcover)
- Pages: 224
- ISBN: 1-85868-016-6
- OCLC: 41900320

A book to accompany the series was published by Carlton Books in late 1993 written by Paul Begg and Martin Fido. Comprising twenty eight true crime cases, the book profiles twenty five of those from series one (including The Hammersmith Murders), one case which would later be profiled in series three (Bentley and Craig) and two that were never featured on the programme (The Krays and The Moors Murders).

== Home media ==
Several collections of Great Crimes and Trials have been released to VHS and DVD. The first and second series were released on video by Columbia Tristar in 1997. The first series was released on DVD by Columbia Tristar in 2005, and the third series was released on DVD by Network DVD in 2011.

In the US, two collections were released by Sony as part of the "Sony Choice Collection" line of burn-on-demand DVD-R's in 2013. Great Crimes And Trials of the 20th Century, Volume 1: Gruesome California features six episodes on one disc of crimes that took place in California and Great Crimes And Trials of the 20th Century, Volume 2: The Original Gangstas features five mob and gangster related episodes on one disc.

== Cited works and further reading ==
- Begg, Paul; Fido, Martin (1994). Great Crimes and Trials of the Twentieth Century. Great Britain: Carlton Books Limited. ISBN 978-0-671-71876-3.
