= Schiffskinder =

Schiffskinder (literally meaning ship-children in German), were the crews of the ships of the Hanseatic League during the late Middle Ages. Schiffskinder and passengers swore allegiance to each other before leaving the harbour. They often fought both on land and at the sea. Sometimes groups of Schiffskinder supported the Teutonic Order armies and there is a record of one Hochmeister who in 1414 awarded one such group, the Schiffskinder of Gdańsk (Danzig), with privileges for their valor in combat against the Poles.
