= Hanseatic Diet =

Meetings of the HanseaticLeague

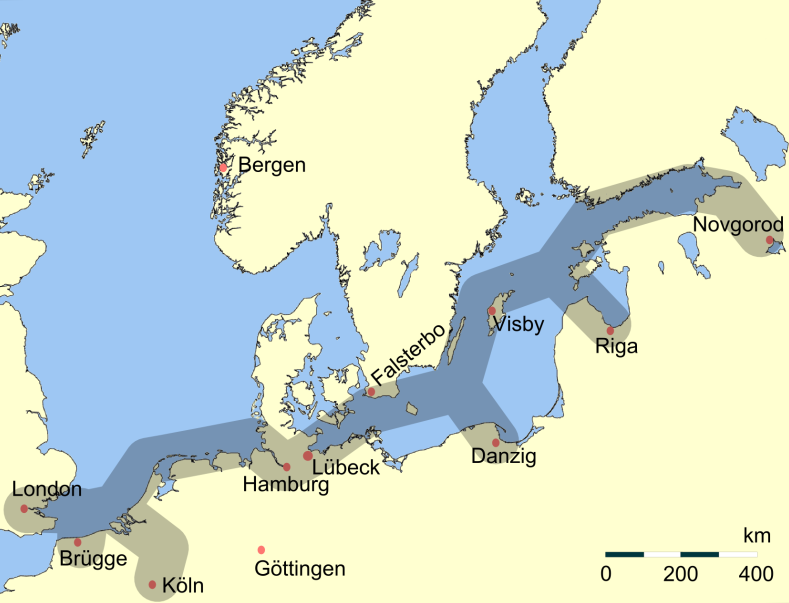
Main trading routes of the Hanseatic League in northern Europe.

The Hanseatic Diet (German: Hansetag) was a meeting of Hanseatic cities which came together to decide important affairs of the Hanseatic League. The first meeting of the Diet took place on 2 February 1356 in Lübeck, with the final one taking place in 1669.

== Background ==
The Hanseatic Diet was the supreme governing organ of the Hanseatic league, which negotiated, decided, and enforced the affairs of the League. It oversaw the management of trade privileges, the ratification of contracts, the establishment of foreign affairs, military affairs, blockades, and the inclusion or exclusion of members from the League. It also held regional conferences to handle regional matters.

There was no greater authority in the Hanseatic League, and thus the Hanseatic Diet was a direct line of communication with the members of the trade league. In this way, the Hanseatic League could be imagined as a flat organization structure, with few levels of leadership.

At the end of a meeting in the Hanseatic Diet, minutes of the meetings would be written up. All agreed-upon decisions would be compiled in what was known as a Hanserezess otherwise Hanserecess, which served as a legislative record. These legislative records are useful for historians, although only those published up to 1537 are available.

The first meeting of the Diet in 1356 took place in Lübeck, with all Drittels of the league in attendance. However, even before the Drittels were officially established, they existed as informal alliances between cities. These alliances were the Wendish-Saxon, Westphalian-Prussian, and Gotlandian-Livonian-Swedish.

The diet was generally poorly attended, with only 10–12 cities generally being represented. The most attended diet was the Hanseatic Diet of 1447, had 39 attendees - merely half. Most cities did not want to have to cover travel expenses, and though repeated absence was punished with fines, poor attendance was a persistent issue. In addition to official League members, other guests such as prince-electors and the Emperor attended, amongst others.

Despite the Diet's dissolution in 1669, the Hanseatic Days of New Time were created in an attempt to re-establish relations between the former cities of the Hanseatic League, and were started in 1980.
