= Heinrich Sudermann =

German official (1520–1591)

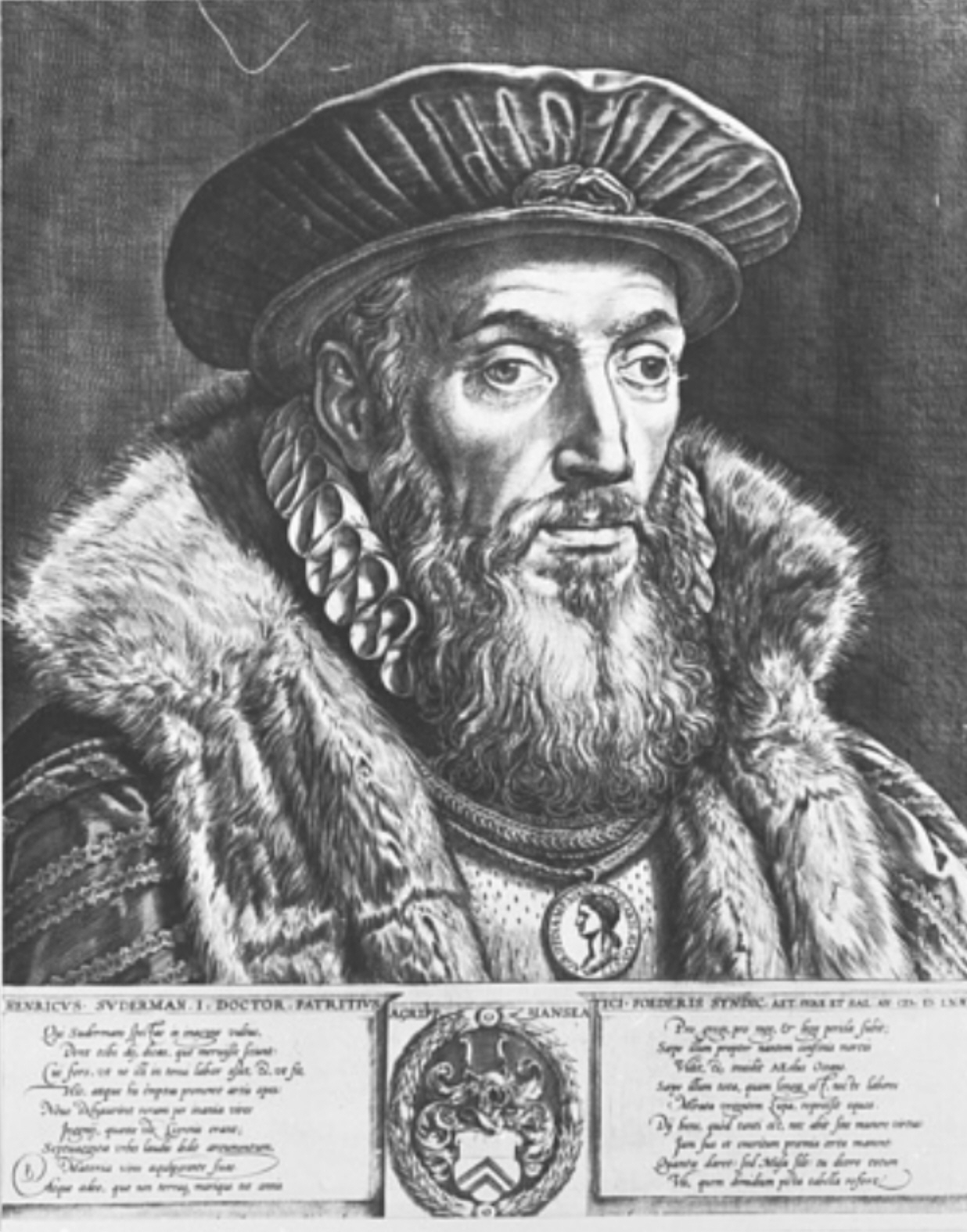
Heinrich Sudermann

Heinrich Sudermann (31 August 1520 – 7 September 1591) was an official of the Hanseatic League from Cologne. When the post of Syndic was created in 1556, Sudermann was elected as permanent official with legal training who worked to protect and extend the diplomatic agreements of the Hansa member towns. In 1557 and 1579, revised agreements spelled out the duties of towns and some progress was made.

== Life ==
He was born in Cologne on 31 August 1520 as the son of Heinrich Sudermann, Mayor of Cologne. He had a sister, Anna, who married Heinrich Olisleger.
