= Henry Olisleger =

Vice Chancellor of the Duchy of Cleves

Dr. Henry Olisleger was Vice Chancellor of the Duchy of Cleves.

He negotiated the marriage of Lady Anne of Cleves, the Duke's sister, to King Henry VIII of England. Olisleger became the Cleves ambassador to England. When there were rumours about Catherine Howard committing adultery, Olisleger tried to persuade the King, Thomas Cranmer, to remarry Anne.

== Marriages ==
His first marriage was to Margaretha Rinck, daughter of Adolf Rinck, mayor of Cologne.

He married secondly Gottfrieda von Bemmel, a daughter of Elisabeth of Cleves, illegitimate daughter of John III, Duke of Cleves.

Thirdly, he married Anna Suderman, sister of lawyer Heinrich Sudermann.
