= Bay Fleet =

The Bay Fleet was a summer convoy of trading ships that travelled through the English Channel from and to the important trading areas of the Hanseatic League, Holland and Flanders in the Middle Ages. The fleet's frequent destination was the salt manufacturing lands of the Bay of Bourgneuf.

In 1449, a fleet organised by Henry VI to keep the Channel free of pirates, turned to piracy themselves under the charge of Robert Winnington, attacking the Bay Fleet in an unprovoked peacetime assault. Fifty Hanseatic ships and sixty ships from the Low Countries were taken by the privateers to the Isle of Wight, released only after diplomatic pressure.

The English privateer ships were owned by members of the King's Council and commanded by Robert Winnington through a letter of indenture. The councillors likely stood to receive one third of all plunder from ships captured by the privateers. The value of the cargoes of the captured Hanseatic vessels is estimated to have been at least £160,000 in 1449, equivalent to around £1.05 trillion GBP in 2025. It is unclear whether the Bay Fleet Capture was the result of a conspiracy within the King's Council to illegally profit from predation on non-enemy shipping.

Appearing crown-sanctioned, the attack sparked outrage amongst the Hanseatic League and a period of reprisals occurred. English merchants were arrested in Hanseatic cities and their goods were seized to pay off damages to Hansard merchants. This put the brunt of the impact of the Bay Fleet Capture on English merchants. In addition, English goods (significantly wool) were now excluded from the continental markets. This had severe consequences for a country with an increasingly large and powerful merchant class who relied on trade with the continent. It could also be argued that the effects permeated throughout society, with 2/3 of wool being produced by peasants who must have suffered from the lack of foreign demand.

The attack on the Bay Fleet came at a time of English foreign policy setbacks on the continent, culminating in Charles VII's entry into Normandy in 1459–60. The attack is an example of how English foreign policy resulted in domestic discontent at the poor governance of the King's Council. This may have been an inciting factor for Jack Cade's Revolt of 1450.

A letter describing the attack on the Bay Fleet was written by Robert Winnington to Thomas Daniel on 25 May 1449.
