= Hanseatic League =

Medieval trade association in Europe

Hanseatic League Hanse (Modern German) Hanse (Middle Low German)
- Hanseatic pennant

- Northern Europe in the 1400s, showing the extent of the Hanseatic League
- Informal capital: Lübeck
- Lingua franca: Middle Low German
- Membership: Various cities across the region of the Baltic and North Seas

The Hanseatic League, (Note: /ˌhænsiˈætɪk/; Middle Low German: Hanse; Düdesche Hanse; Hansa; Modern German: Deutsche Hanse; Dutch: Hanze; Latin: Hansa Teutonica.) commonly called The Hansa, was a medieval commercial and defensive network of merchant guilds and market towns in Central and Northern Europe. Growing from Lübeck and a few other North German towns in the late 12th century, the league expanded between the 13th and 15th centuries, ultimately encompassing nearly 200 settlements across eight modern-day countries, from Estonia and Russia in the northeast to the Netherlands in the west, with its inland extent reaching as far south as Cologne.

The league began as a collection of loosely associated groups of German traders and towns aiming to expand their commercial interests, including protection against robbery. Over time, these arrangements evolved into the league, offering traders toll privileges and protection on affiliated territory and trade routes. Economic interdependence and familial connections among merchant families led to deeper political integration and the reduction of trade barriers. This gradual process involved standardizing trade regulations among Hanseatic cities.

During its time, the Hanseatic League dominated maritime trade in the North and Baltic Seas. It established a network of trading posts in numerous towns and cities, notably the Kontors in London (known as the Steelyard), Bruges, Bergen, and Novgorod, which became extraterritorial entities that enjoyed considerable legal autonomy. Hanseatic merchants operated private companies and were known for their access to commodities, and enjoyed privileges and protections abroad. The league's economic power enabled it to impose blockades and even wage war against kingdoms and principalities.

Even at its peak, the Hanseatic League remained a loosely aligned confederation of cities. It lacked a permanent administrative body, a treasury, and a standing military force. The Grand Master of the Teutonic Order was often seen as the head of the Hansa (caput Hansae), both abroad and by some League members. The Teutonic Order was an official member of the Hanseatic League, unique as the only autonomous landed state to hold membership, while other members were cities or individual merchants. The Order and the Hanseatic League had a close economic and military interdependency, with many important Hanseatic trading ports falling within the Order's territories, and the Order itself played a role in protecting and organizing Baltic trade networks.

In the 14th century, the Hanseatic League instated an irregular negotiating diet that operated based on deliberation and consensus. By the mid-16th century, these weak connections left the Hanseatic League vulnerable, and it gradually unraveled as members merged into other realms or departed, ultimately disintegrating in 1669.

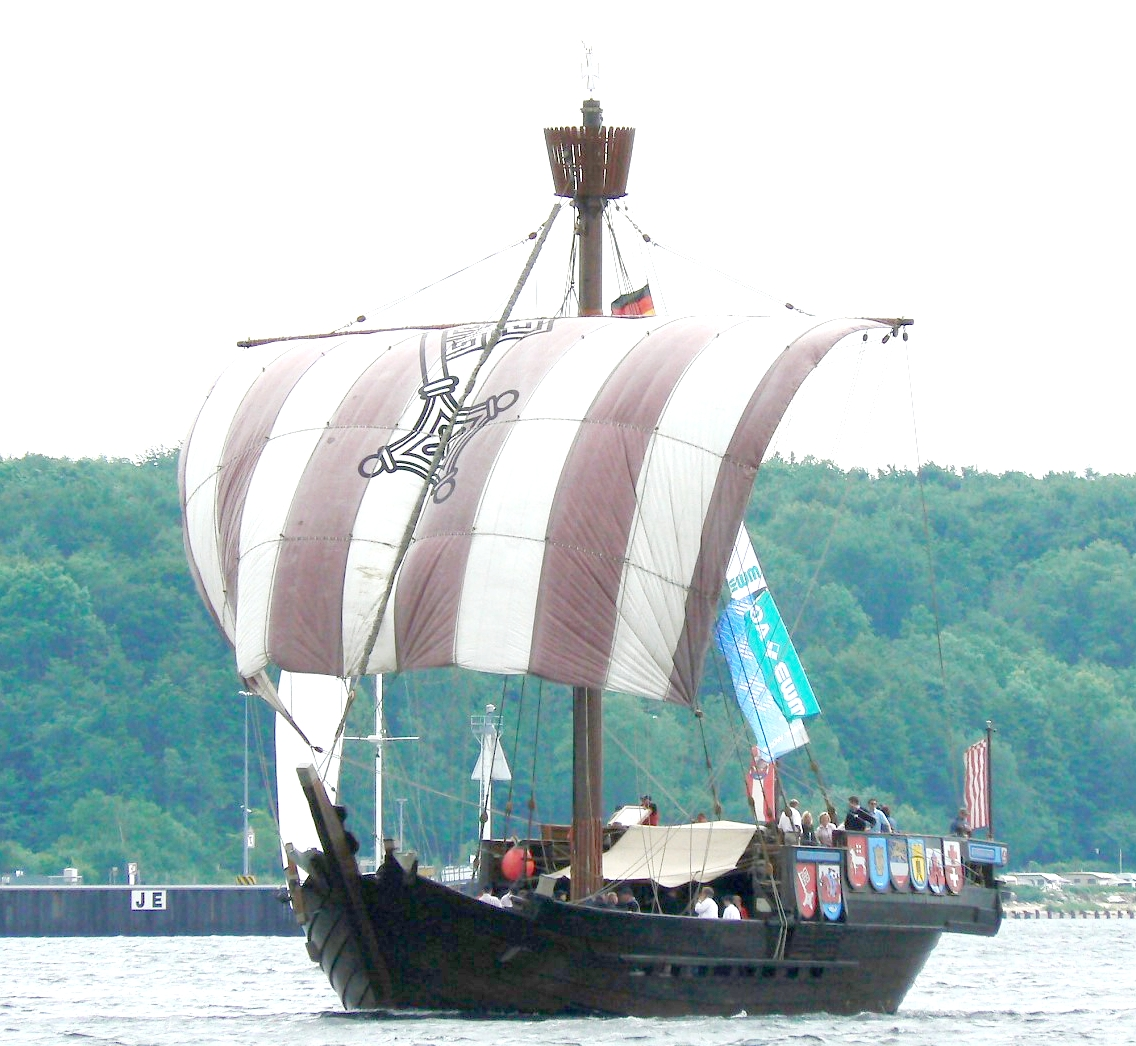
Ubena von Bremen, a replica of the Bremen cog

The league used a variety of vessel types for shipping across the seas and navigating rivers. The most emblematic type was the cog. Expressing diversity in construction, it was depicted on Hanseatic seals and coats of arms. By the end of the Middle Ages, the cog was replaced by types like the hulk, which later gave way to larger carvel ships.

== Etymology ==
Hansa is the Old High German word for a band or troop. This word was applied to bands of merchants traveling between the Hanseatic cities. Hanse in Middle Low German came to mean a society of merchants or a trader guild. Claims that it originally meant An-See, or 'on the sea', are incorrect.

== History ==
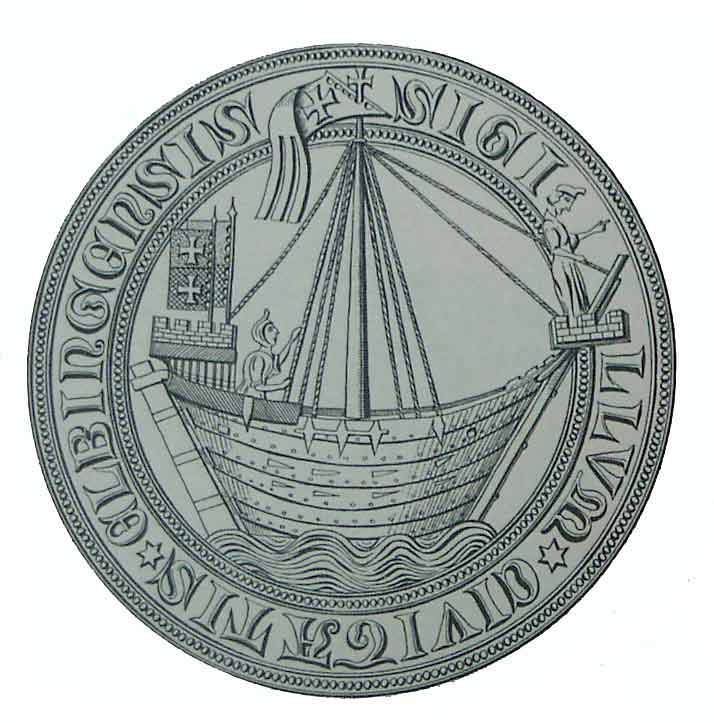
Hanseatic Seal of Elbing (now Elbląg)

Exploratory trading ventures, raids, and piracy occurred throughout the Baltic Sea. The Scandinavians led the Baltic trade before the league, establishing major trading hubs at Birka, Haithabu, and Schleswig by the 9th century CE. The later Hanseatic ports between Mecklenburg and Königsberg (present-day Kaliningrad) originally formed part of the Scandinavian-led Baltic trade system. The sailors of Gotland sailed up rivers as far away as Novgorod in northwestern Russia. The Gothic court was founded around the turn of the 12th century, and following the establishment of major trade centres in the Baltic, Novgorod gradually became a major trade power.

As the Hanseatic League was never formally founded, it lacks a date of foundation. Historians have traditionally traced its origins to the rebuilding of the north German town of Lübeck in 1159 by the powerful Henry the Lion, Duke of Saxony and Bavaria, after he had captured the area from Adolf II, Count of Schauenburg and Holstein. More recent scholarship has deemphasized Lübeck, viewing it as one of several regional trading centers, and presenting the league as the combination of a north German trading system oriented on the Baltic and a Rhinelandic trading system targeting England and Flanders.

German cities speedily dominated trade in the Baltic during the 13th century, and Lübeck became a central node in the seaborne trade that linked the areas around the North and Baltic Seas. Lübeck hegemony peaked during the 15th century.

=== Foundation and early development ===
Well before the term Hanse appeared in a document in 1267, in different cities began to form guilds, or hansas, with the intention of trading with overseas towns, especially in the economically less-developed eastern Baltic. This area could supply timber, wax, amber, resins, and furs, along with rye and wheat brought on barges from the hinterland to port markets. Merchant guilds formed in hometowns and destination ports as medieval corporations (universitates mercatorum), and despite competition increasingly cooperated to coalesce into the Hanseatic network of merchant guilds. The dominant language of trade was Middle Low German, which had a significant impact on the languages spoken in the area, particularly the larger Scandinavian languages, Estonian, and Latvian.

Visby, on the island of Gotland, functioned as the leading center in the Baltic before the Hansa. Sailing east, Visby merchants established a trading post at Novgorod called Gutagard (also known as Gotenhof) in 1080. In 1120, Gotland gained autonomy from Sweden and admitted traders from its southern and western regions. Thereafter, under a treaty with the Visby Hansa, northern German merchants made regular stops at Gotland. Visby became a major transfer stop, particularly for trade with Novgorod, which was the chief Russian market. In the first half of the 13th century, they established their own trading station or Kontor in Novgorod, known as the Peterhof, up the river Volkhov.

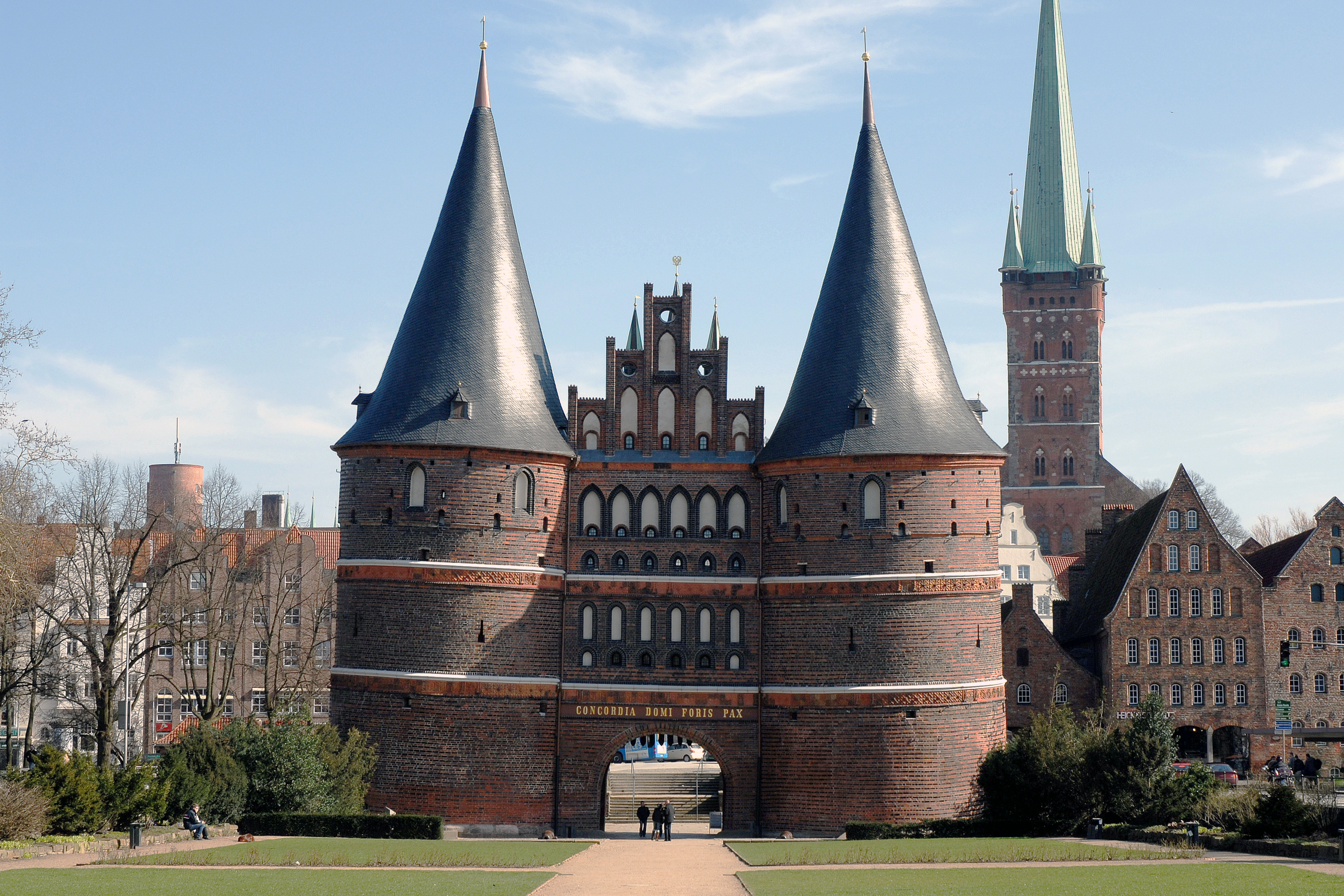
The Holstentor of Lübeck, built in 1464, is the only historic gate of the city still standing today.

Lübeck soon became a base for merchants from Saxony and Westphalia trading eastward and northward; for them, because of its shorter and easier access route and better legal protections, it was more attractive than Schleswig. It became a transshipment port for trade between the North Sea and the Baltics. Lübeck also granted extensive trade privileges to Russian and Scandinavian traders. It was the main supply port for the Northern Crusades, improving its standing with various Popes. Lübeck gained privileges to become a free imperial city of the Holy Roman Empire in 1226, under King Valdemar II of Denmark, as had Hamburg in 1189. Also in this period Wismar, Rostock, Stralsund, and Danzig received city charters.

Hansa societies worked to remove trade restrictions for their members. The earliest documentary mention (although without a name) of a specific German commercial federation dates between 1173 and 1175 (commonly misdated to 1157) in London. That year, the merchants of the Hansa in Cologne convinced King Henry II of England to exempt them from all tolls in London and to grant protection to merchants and goods throughout England.

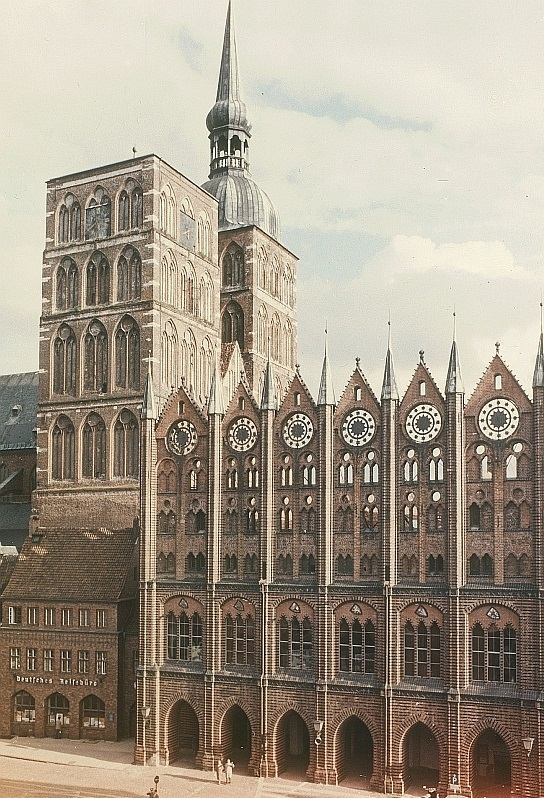
The Hanseatic League left a significant cultural and architectural heritage. It is especially renowned for its Brick Gothic monuments, such as Stralsund's St. Nikolai Church (built in the 13th-14th centuries, with some later additions) and its City Hall (built c. 1230-1444), shown here. The old town of Stralsund, together with Wismar, is a UNESCO World Heritage Site.

German colonists in the 12th and 13th centuries settled in numerous cities on and near the east Baltic coast, such as Elbing (Elbląg), Thorn (Toruń), Reval (Tallinn), Riga, and Dorpat (Tartu), all of which joined the league, and some of which retain Hansa buildings and bear the style of their Hanseatic days. Most adopted Lübeck law, after the league's most prominent town. The law provided that they appeal in all legal matters to Lübeck's city council. Others, like Danzig from 1295 onwards, had Magdeburg law or its derivative, Culm law. The foundations of a new German state, the Teutonic Order, were laid with the acquisition of Livonia and later Estonia. The Grand Master of the Teutonic Order was later accepted as a member of the Hanseatic League and he was the only territorial prince to enjoy this privilege.

Over the 13th century, older and wealthier long-distance traders increasingly chose to settle in their hometowns as trade leaders, transitioning from their previous roles as landowners. The growing number of settled merchants afforded long-distance traders greater influence over town policies. Coupled with an increased presence in the ministerial class, this elevated the status of merchants and enabled them to expand to and assert dominance over more cities. This decentralized arrangement was fostered by slow travel speeds: moving from Reval to Lübeck took between 4 weeks and, in winter, 4 months.

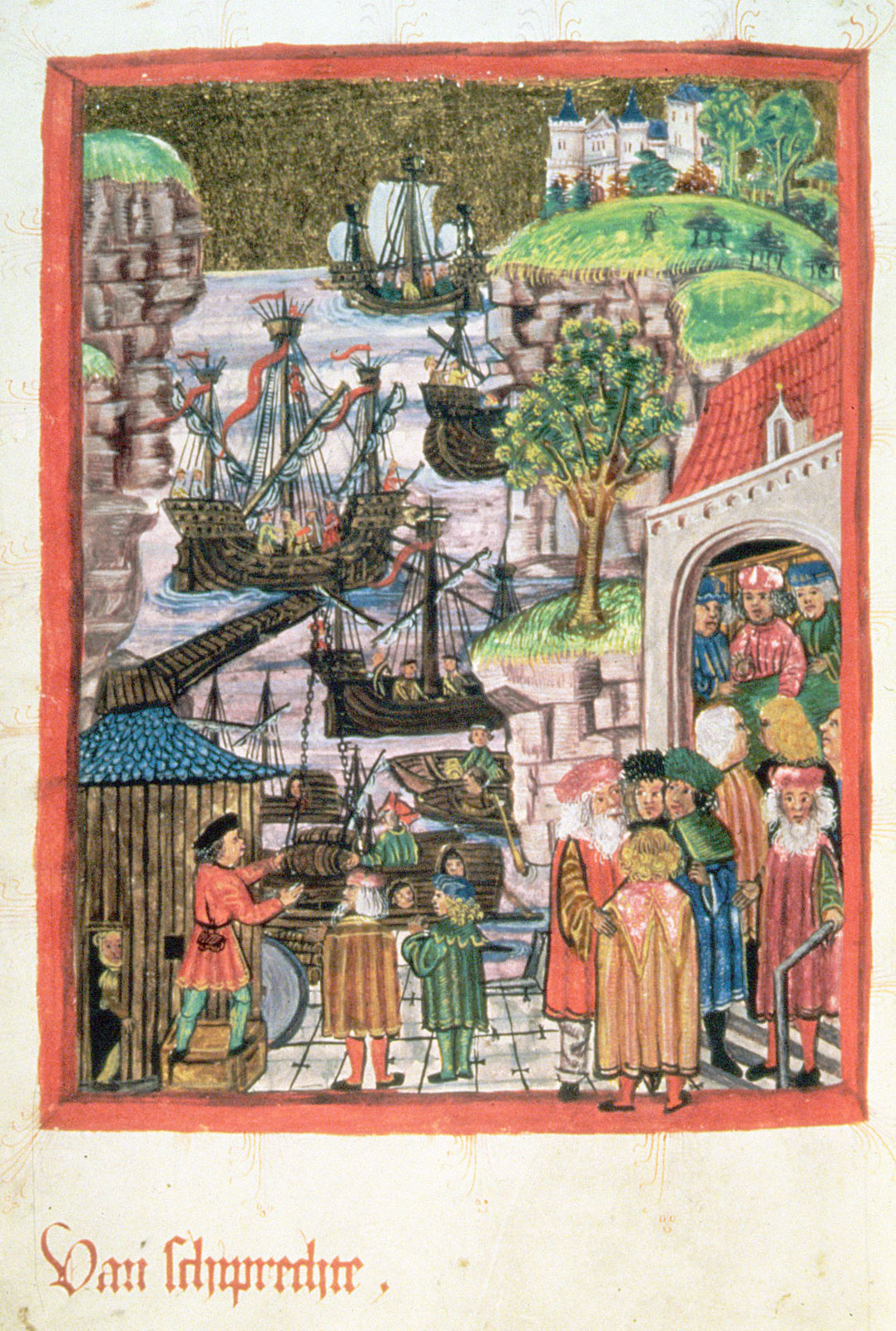
Foundation of the alliance between Lübeck and Hamburg in the part about ship law (Van schiprechte) in the Hamburg city right from 1497

In 1241, Lübeck, which had access to the Baltic and North seas' fishing grounds, formed an alliance—a precursor to the league—with the trade city of Hamburg, which controlled access to the salt-trade routes from Lüneburg. These cities gained control over most of the salt-fish trade, especially the Scania Market; Cologne joined them in the Diet of 1260. The towns raised their armies, with each guild required to provide levies when needed. The Hanseatic cities aided one another, and commercial ships often served to carry soldiers and their arms. The network of alliances grew to include a flexible roster of 70 to 170 cities.

In the west, cities of the Rhineland such as Cologne enjoyed trading privileges in Flanders and England. In 1266, King Henry III of England granted the Lübeck and Hamburg Hansa a charter for operations in England, initially causing competition with the Westphalians. But the Cologne Hansa and the Wendish Hansa joined in 1282 to form the Hanseatic colony in London, although they did not completely merge until the 15th century. Novgorod was blockaded in 1268 and 1277/1278. Nonetheless, Westphalian traders continued to dominate trade in London and also Ipswich and Colchester, while Baltic and Wendish traders concentrated between King's Lynn and Newcastle upon Tyne. Much of the drive for cooperation came from the fragmented nature of existing territorial governments, which did not provide security for trade. Over the next 50 years, the merchant Hansa solidified with formal agreements for co-operation covering the west and east trade routes. Cities from the east modern-day Low Countries, but also Utrecht, Holland, Zealand, Brabant, Namur, and modern Limburg joined in participation over the thirteenth century. This network of Hanseatic trading guilds became called the Kaufmannshanse in historiography.

=== Commercial expansion ===
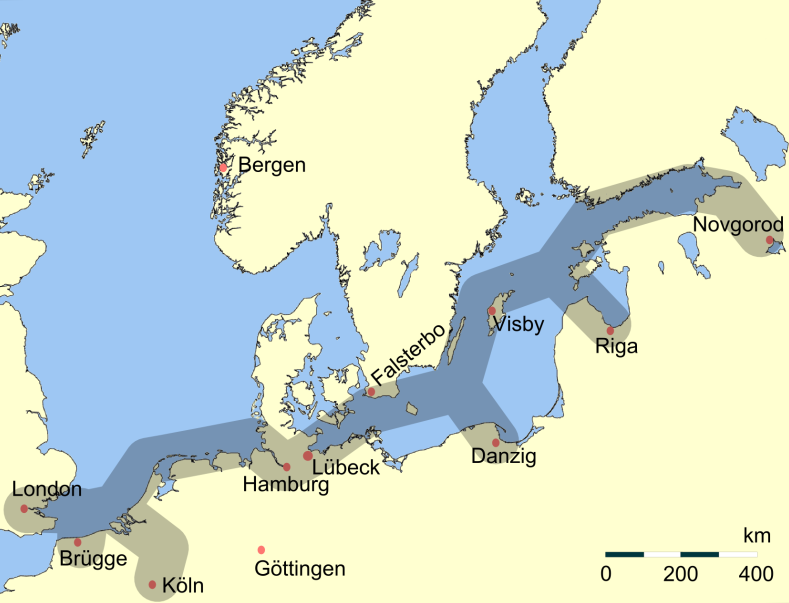
Main trading routes of the Hanseatic League

The league succeeded in establishing additional Kontors in Bruges (Flanders), Bryggen in Bergen (Norway), and London (England) beside the Peterhof in Novgorod. These trading posts were institutionalised by the first half of the 14th century (for Bergen and Bruges) and, except for the Kontor of Bruges, became significant enclaves. The London Kontor, the Steelyard, stood west of London Bridge near Upper Thames Street, on the site later occupied by Cannon Street station. It grew into a walled community with its warehouses, weigh house, church, offices, and homes.

In addition to the major Kontors, individual ports with Hanseatic trading outposts or factories had a representative merchant and warehouse. Often they were not permanently manned. In Scania, Denmark, around 30 Hanseatic seasonal factories produced salted herring, these were called vitten and were granted legal autonomy to the extent that Burkhardt argues that they resembled a fifth kontor and would be seen as such if not for their early decline. In England, factories in Boston (the outpost was also called Stalhof), Bristol, Bishop's Lynn (later King's Lynn, which featured the sole remaining Hanseatic warehouse in England), Hull, Ipswich, Newcastle upon Tyne, Norwich, Scarborough, Yarmouth (now Great Yarmouth), and York, many of which were important for the Baltic trade and became centers of the textile industry in the late 14th century. Hansards and textile manufacturers coordinated to make fabrics meet local demand and fashion in the traders' hometowns. Outposts in Lisbon, Bordeaux, Bourgneuf, La Rochelle and Nantes offered the cheaper Bay salt. Ships that plied this trade sailed in the salt fleet. Trading posts operated in Flanders, Denmark-Norway, the Baltic interior, Upper Germany, Iceland, and Venice.

Hanseatic trade was not exclusively maritime, or even over water. Most Hanseatic towns did not have immediate access to the sea and many were linked to partners by river trade or even land trade. These formed an integrated network, while many smaller Hanseatic towns had their main trading activity in subregional trade. Internal Hanseatic trade was the Hanse's quantitatively largest and most important business. Trade over rivers and land was not tied to specific Hanseatic privileges, but seaports such as Bremen, Hamburg and Riga dominated trade on their rivers. This was not possible for the Rhine where trade retained an open character. Digging canals for trade was uncommon, although the Stecknitz Canal was built between Lübeck and Lauenburg from 1391 to 1398.

==== Major trade goods ====
Imports and exports, 18 Mar 1368 – 10 Mar 1369 (in thousands of Port Lübeck marks)
Imports	Origin, Destination	Exports	Total	%
150	London/Hamburg	38	188	34.4
44	Livonian towns:	51	95	17.4
10	Riga	14		
34	Reval (Tallinn)	14.3		
-	Pernau	22.7		
49.4	Scania	32.6	82	15
52	Gotland, Sweden	29.4	81.4	14.9
19	Prussian towns:	29.5	48.5	8.9
16	Danzig	22.8		
3	Elbing	6.6		
17.2	Wendish & Pomeranian towns:	25.2	42.4	7.8
5.5	Stettin	7		
4	Stralsund	7.5		
2.2	Rostock	4.6		
5.5	Wismar	6.1		
4.3	Bergen	–	4.3	0.8
3	Small Baltic ports	1.2	4.2	0.8
338.9	Total	206.9	545.8	100

Starting with trade in coarse woolen fabrics, the Hanseatic League increased both commerce and industry in northern Germany. As trade increased, finer woolen and linen fabrics, and even silks, were manufactured in northern Germany. The same refinement of products out of the cottage industry occurred in other fields, e.g. etching, wood carving, armor production, engraving of metals, and wood-turning.

The league primarily traded beeswax, furs, timber, resin (or tar), flax, honey, wheat, and rye from the east to Flanders and England with cloth, in particular broadcloth, (and, increasingly, manufactured goods) going in the other direction. Metal ore (principally copper and iron) and herring came south from Sweden, while the Carpathians were another important source of copper and iron, often sold in Thorn. Lubeck had a vital role in the salt trade; salt was acquired in Lüneburg or shipped from France and Portugal and sold on Central European markets, taken to Scania to salt herring, or exported to Russia. Stockfish was traded from Bergen in exchange for grain; Hanseatic grain inflows allowed more permanent settlements further north in Norway. The league also traded beer, with beer from Hanseatic towns the most valued, and Wendish cities like Lübeck, Hamburg, Wismar, and Rostock developed export breweries for hopped beer.

==== Economic power and defense ====
The Hanseatic League, at first the merchant hansas and eventually its cities, relied on power to secure protection and gain and preserve privileges. Bandits and pirates were persistent problems; during wars, these could be joined by privateers. Traders could be arrested abroad and their goods could be confiscated. The league sought to codify protection; internal treaties established mutual defense and external treaties codified privileges.

Many locals, merchant and noble alike, envied the league's power and tried to diminish it. For example, in London, local merchants exerted continuing pressure for the revocation of privileges. Most foreign cities confined Hanseatic traders to specific trading areas and their trading posts. The refusal of the Hansa to offer reciprocal arrangements to their counterparts exacerbated the tension.

League merchants used their economic power to pressure cities and rulers. They called embargoes, redirected trade away from towns, and boycotted entire countries. Blockades were erected against Novgorod in 1268 and 1277/1278. Bruges was pressured by temporarily moving the Hanseatic emporium to Aardenburg from 1280 to 1282, from 1307 or 1308 to 1310 and in 1350, to Dordt in 1358 and 1388, and to Antwerp in 1436. Boycotts against Norway in 1284 and Flanders in 1358 nearly caused famines. They sometimes resorted to military action. Several Hanseatic cities maintained their warships and in times of need, repurposed merchant ships. Military action against political powers often involved an ad hoc coalition of stakeholders, called an alliance (tohopesate).

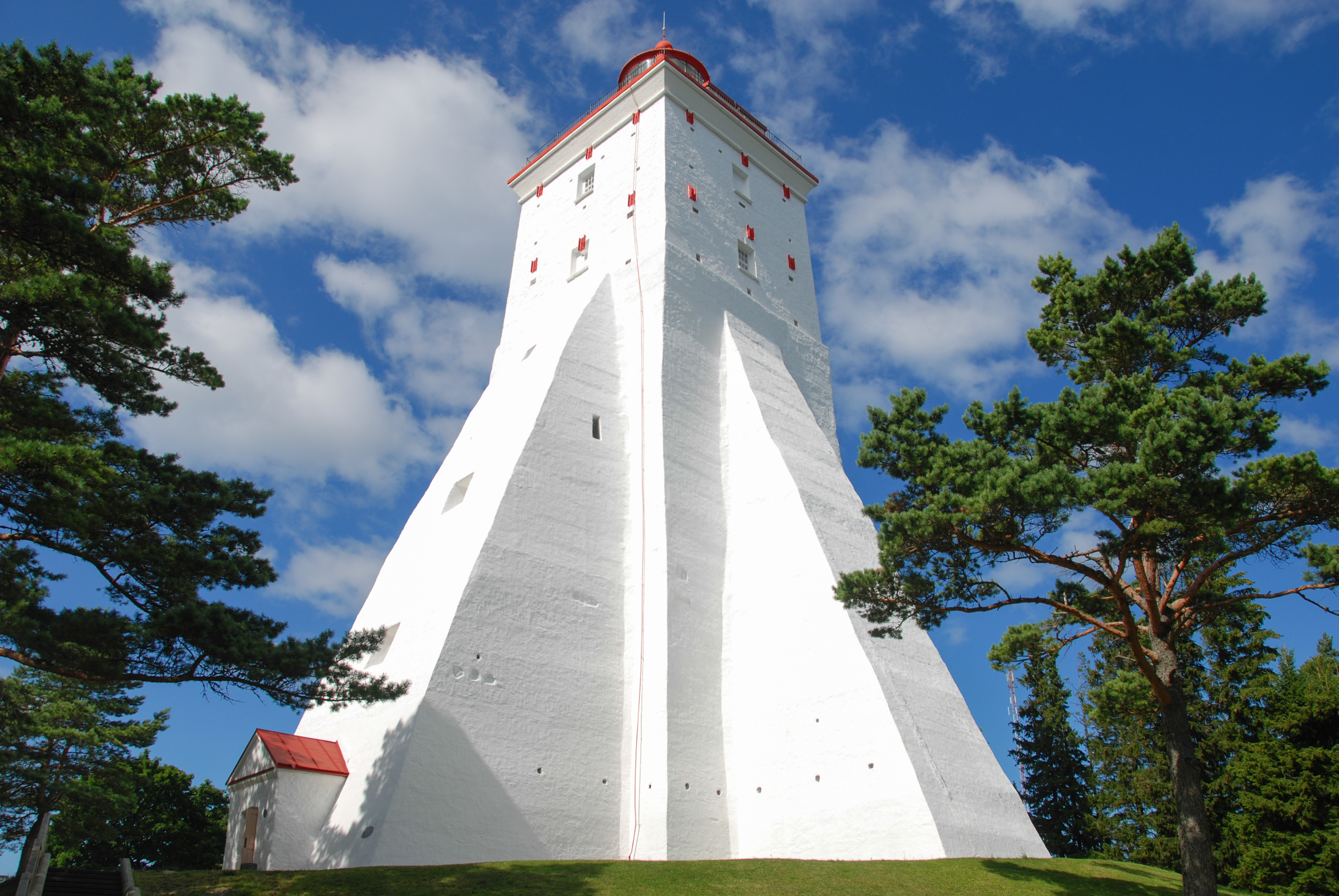
Kõpu Lighthouse in Hiiumaa

As an essential part of protecting their investments, League members trained pilots and erected lighthouses, including Kõpu Lighthouse. Lübeck erected in 1202 what may be northern Europe's first proper lighthouse in Falsterbo. By 1600 at least 15 lighthouses had been erected along the German and Scandinavian coasts, making it the best-lighted coast in the world, largely thanks to the Hansa.

=== Zenith ===
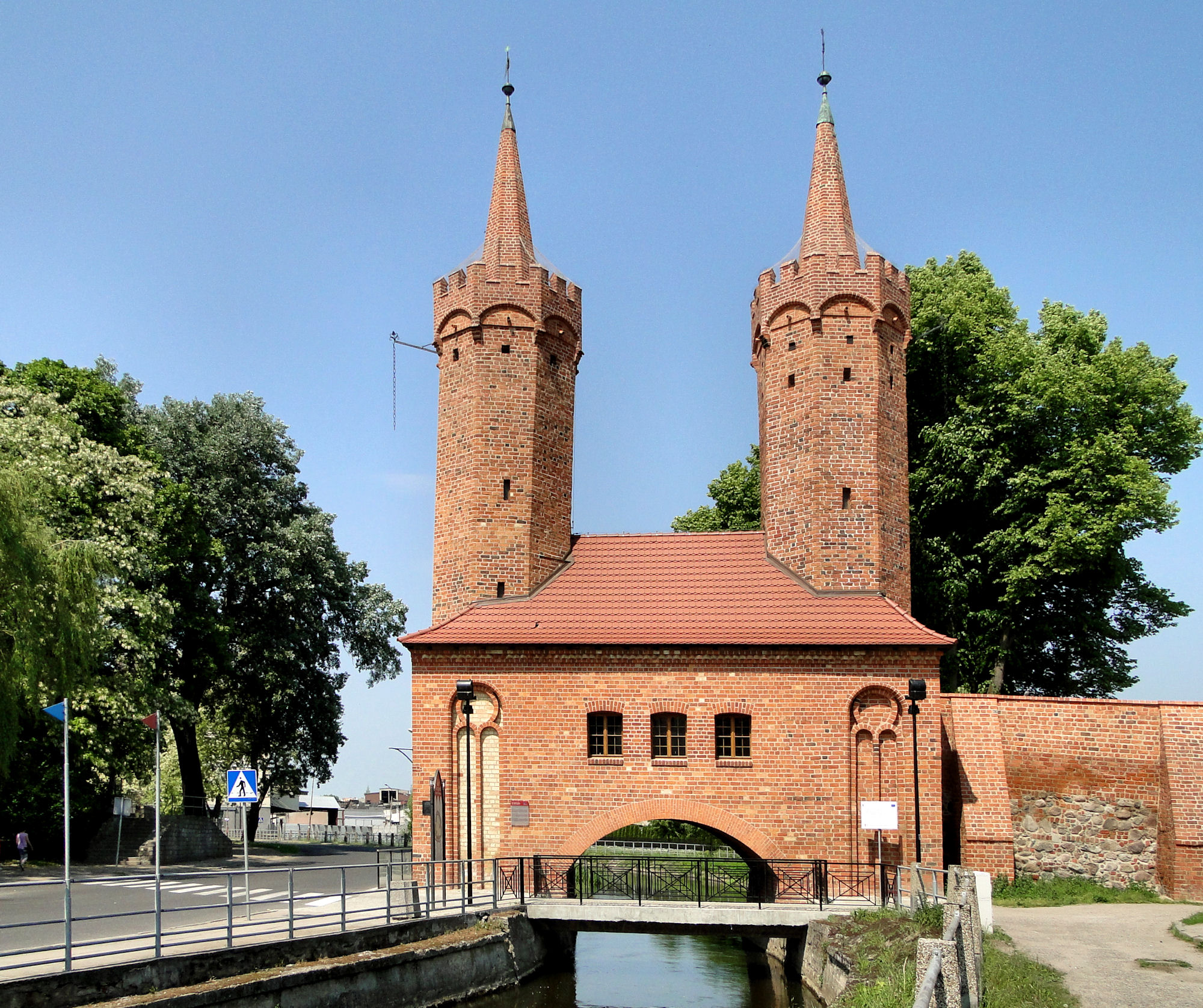
Stargard Mill Gate, Pomerania, today in Poland

The weakening of imperial power and imperial protection under the late Hohenstaufen dynasty forced the league to institutionalize a cooperating network of cities with a fluid structure, called the Städtehanse, but it never became a formal organization and the Kaufmannshanse continued to exist. This development was delayed by the conquest of Wendish cities by the Danish king Eric VI Menved or by their feudal overlords between 1306 and 1319 and the restriction of their autonomy. Assemblies of the Hanse towns met irregularly in Lübeck for a Hansetag (Hanseatic Diet) – starting either around 1300, or possibly 1356. Many towns chose not to attend nor to send representatives, and decisions were not binding on individual cities if their delegates were not included in the recesses; representatives would sometimes leave the Diet prematurely to give their towns an excuse not to ratify decisions. (Note: Een opvalled euvel betrof de gewoonte dat gezanten, die voor hen nadelige afspraken niet konden accepteren, vroegtijdig de Hanzedag verlieten. Op deze wijze hoopten zij niet in de notulen, de zogenaamde Hanzerecessen, te worden opgenomen. Het verschafte de stadsbesturen vervolgens de mogelijkheid de daarin opgenomen besluiten niet te ratificeren. [...] Opvallend is dat de Hanzedag, en ook Lübeck en de Wendische steden, niet in staat waren dit fenomeen te sanctioneren en zelfs een gedoogpolitiek ontstond. Terwijl veel historici hierin een essentiële zwakte van de Hanze zien, vat Pichierri dit op als een teken van flexibiliteit. [...] Al met al zijn dit enkele kenmerken van een organisatiestructuur die bij sociologen als een netwerk met losse bindingen te boek staat. De verbindingen tussen de verschillende leden van een dergelijke netwerk waren niet star noch daadwerkelijk verplichtend. [...] Het gebrek aan duurzame samenhand vloeide voort uit de grote autonomie van de steden zoals deze besloten lag in het zogenaamde Einungsrecht. [...] Juist doordat de Hanzevergadering vast bleef houden aan het uitgangspunt dat de gemeenschappelijke wil van alle steden afzonderlijk gerespecteerd moest worden, kon een besluit alleen op grond van algemene instemming genomen worden. [...] Volgens de principes van het Einungsrecht was echter geen enkele stad gedwongen zich aan de wil of aan de besluiten van een woordvoerder, in dit geval de Algemene Hanzedag, te onderwerpen. Aan het einde van de besluitvormingsketen was de instemming van de stedelijke gemeenschap doorslaggevend, ongeacht wat er op hogere niveaus was afgesproken. Het kwam derhalve zeer regelmatig voor dat besluiten die raadszendbode vanuit een minderheidspositie stilzwijgend moesten aanvaarden, achteraf door hun stadsbesturen werden afgewezen. A notable shortcoming concerned the custom that envoys, who could not accept arrangements that were disadvantageous for them, left the Hanseatic Day prematurely. In this way they hoped not to be included in the minutes, the so-called Hanseatic recesses. It then provided the city authorities with the option of not ratifying the decrees contained therein. [...] It is striking that the Hanseatic Day, and also Lübeck and the Wendish cities, were unable to sanction this phenomenon and even a policy of condoning arose. While many historians see this as an essential weakness of the Hanseatic League, Pichierri sees this as a sign of flexibility. [...] All in all, these are some characteristics of an organizational structure that sociologists regard as a network with loose connections. The connections between the various members of such a network were neither rigid nor actually binding. [...] The lack of sustainable cohesion arose from the great autonomy of the cities as it was implied in the so-called Einungsrecht. [...] Precisely because the Hanseatic Assembly continued to adhere to the principle that the common will of all individual cities had to be respected, a decision could only be taken on the basis of general consent. [...] According to the principles of Einungsrecht, however, no city was forced to submit to the will or to the decisions of a spokesman, in this case the General Hansedag. At the end of the decision-making chain, the agreement of the urban community was decisive, regardless of what was agreed at higher levels. It therefore happened very regularly that decisions that council messengers had to accept tacitly from a minority position were subsequently rejected by their city councils (Brand & Egge 2010, pp. 36–39).) Only a few Hanseatic cities were free imperial cities or enjoyed comparable autonomy and liberties, but many temporarily escaped domination by local nobility.

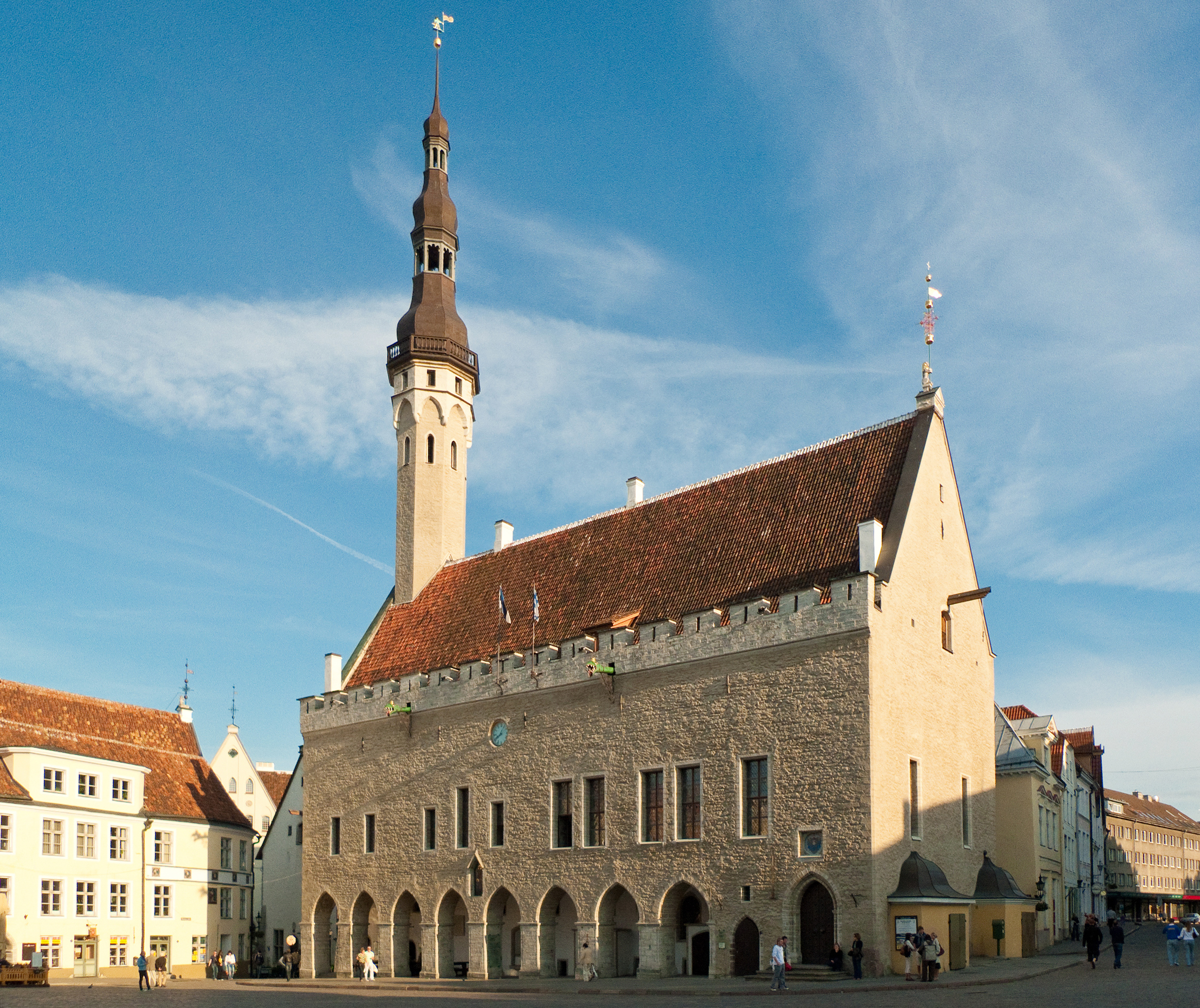
Town Hall of Reval (now Tallinn, Estonia)

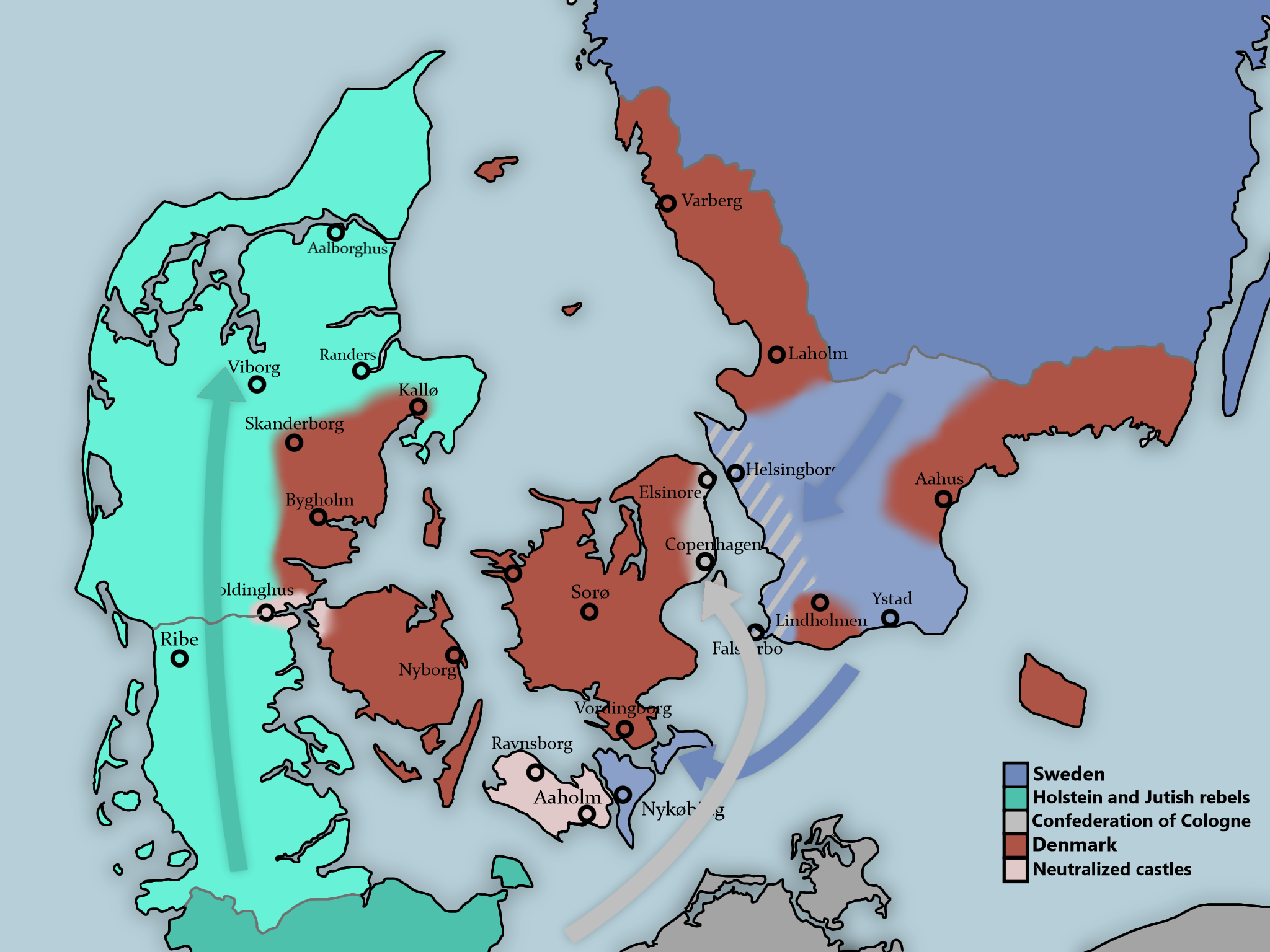
Military situation in Denmark (1370) after foreign invasions.

Between 1361 and 1370, League members fought against Denmark in the Danish-Hanseatic War. Though initially unsuccessful with a Wendish offensive, towns from Prussia and the Netherlands, and eventually joined by Wendish towns, allied in the Confederation of Cologne in 1368, sacked Copenhagen and Helsingborg, and forced Valdemar IV, King of Denmark, and his son-in-law Haakon VI, King of Norway, to grant tax exemptions and influence over Øresund fortresses for 15 years in the peace treaty of Stralsund in 1370. It extended privileges in Scania to the league, including Holland and Zeeland. The treaty marked the height of Hanseatic influence; for this period the league was called a "Northern European great power". The Confederation lasted until 1385, while the Øresund fortresses were returned to Denmark that year.

After Valdemar's heir Olav died, a succession dispute erupted over Denmark and Norway between Albert of Mecklenburg, King of Sweden and Margaret I, Queen of Denmark. This was further complicated when Swedish nobles rebelled against Albert and invited Margaret. Albert was taken prisoner in 1389, but hired privateers in 1392, the socalled Victual Brothers, who took Bornholm and Visby in his name. They and their descendants threatened maritime trade between 1392 and the 1430s. Under the 1395 release agreement for Albert, Stockholm was ruled from 1395 to 1398 by a consortium of 7 Hanseatic cities, and enjoyed full Hanseatic trading privileges. It went to Margaret in 1398.

The Victual Brothers controlled Gotland in 1398. It was conquered by the Teutonic Order with support from the Prussian towns and its privileges were restored.

=== Rise of rival powers ===
Over the 15th century, the league became further institutionalized. This was in part a response to challenges in governance and competition with rivals, but also reflected changes in trade. A slow shift occurred from loose participation to formal recognition/revocation. Another general trend was Hanseatic cities' increased legislation of their kontors abroad. Only the Bergen kontor grew more independent in this period.

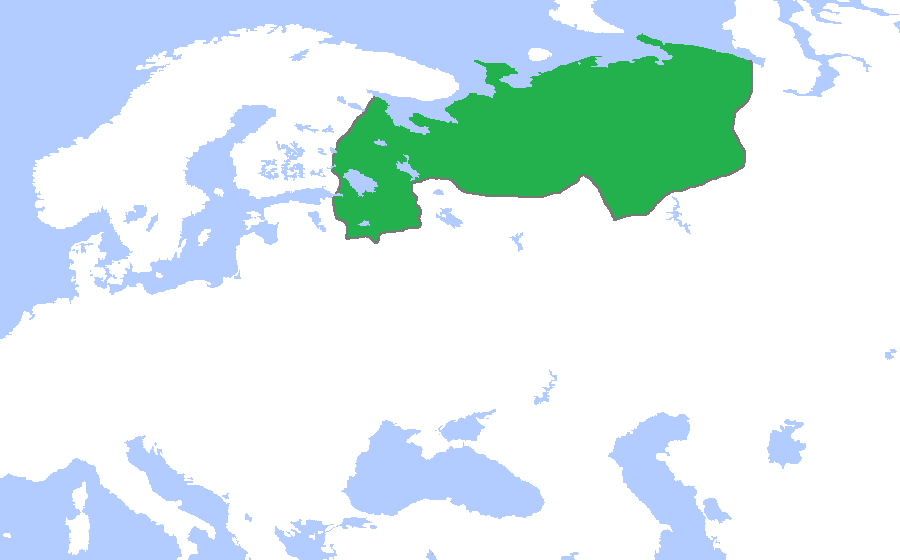
The Novgorod Republic c. 1400. Novgorod created a vast territorial empire and controlled much of the fur trade with Europe. The city was one of the main trading posts of the Hanseatic League.

In Novgorod, after extended conflict since the 1380s, the league regained its trade privileges in 1392, agreeing to Russian trade privileges for Livonia and Gotland.

In 1424, all German traders of the Peterhof kontor in Novgorod were imprisoned and 36 of them died. Although rare, arrests and seizures in Novgorod were particularly violent. In response, and due to the ongoing war between Novgorod and the Teutonic Order, the league blockaded Novgorod and abandoned the Peterhof from 1443 to 1448.

After extended conflicts with the league from the 1370s, English traders gained trade privileges in the Prussian region via the treaties of Marienburg (the first in 1388, the last in 1409). Their influence increased, while the importance of Hanseatic trade in England decreased over the 15th century.

Over the 15th century, tensions between the Prussian region and the "Wendish" cities (Lübeck and its eastern neighbours) increased. Lübeck was dependent on its role as center of the Hansa; Prussia's main interest, on the other hand, was the export of bulk products such as grain and timber to England, the Low Countries and later on Spain and Italy.

Frederick II, Elector of Brandenburg, tried to assert authority over the Hanseatic towns Berlin and Cölln in 1442 and blocked all Brandenburg towns from participating in Hanseatic diets. For some Brandenburg towns, this ended their Hanseatic involvement. In 1488, John Cicero, Elector of Brandenburg did the same to Stendal and Salzwedel in the Altmark.

Until 1394, Holland and Zeeland actively participated in the Hansa, but in 1395, their feudal obligations to Albert I, Duke of Bavaria prevented further cooperation. Consequently, their Hanseatic ties weakened, and their economic focus shifted. Between 1417 and 1432, this economic reorientation became even more pronounced as Holland and Zeeland gradually became part of the Burgundian State.

The city of Lübeck faced financial troubles in 1403, leading dissenting craftsmen to establish a supervising committee in 1405. This triggered a governmental crisis in 1408 when the committee rebelled and established a new town council. Similar revolts broke out in Wismar and Rostock, with new town councils established in 1410. The crisis was ended in 1418 by a compromise.

Eric of Pomerania succeeded Margaret in 1412 and sought to expand into Schleswig and Holstein levying tolls at the Øresund. Hanseatic cities were divided initially; Lübeck tried to appease Eric while Hamburg supported the Schauenburg counts against him. This led to the Danish-Hanseatic War (1426–1435) and the Bombardment of Copenhagen (1428). The Treaty of Vordingborg renewed the league's commercial privileges in 1435, but the Øresund tolls continued.

Eric of Pomerania was subsequently deposed and in 1438 Lübeck took control of the Øresund toll, which caused tensions with Holland and Zeeland. The Sound tolls, (Note: The Sound here is the Øresund, the strait between the Danish island of Zealand (Sjælland) and Sweden.) and a later attempt of Lübeck to exclude the English and Dutch merchants from Scania harmed the Scanian herring trade when the excluded regions began to develop their own herring industries.

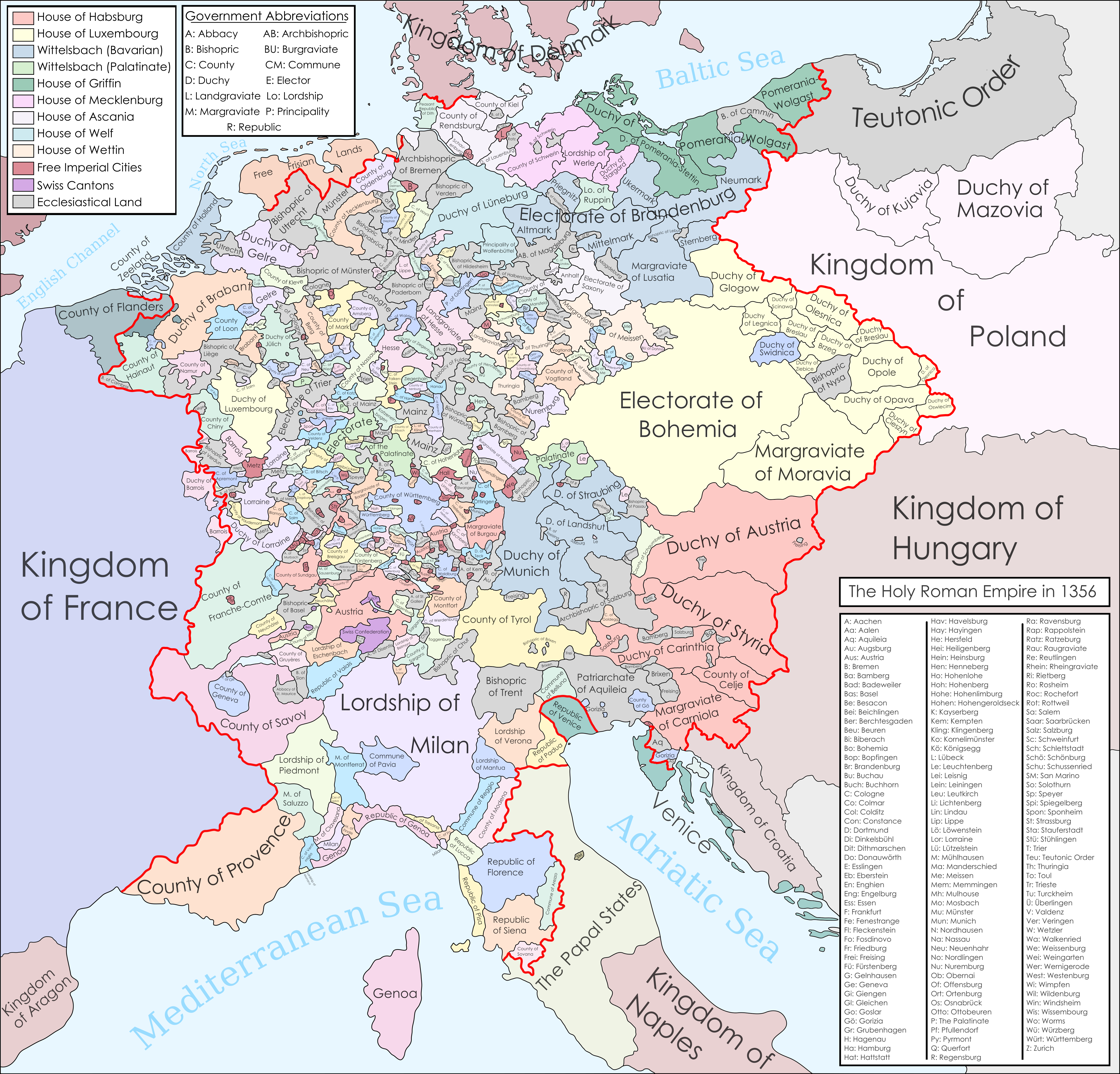
The Holy Roman Empire was a limited elective monarchy composed of hundreds of state-like entities.

In the Dutch–Hanseatic War (1438–1441), a privateer war mostly waged by Wendish towns, the merchants of Amsterdam sought and eventually won free access to the Baltic. Although the blockade of the grain trade hurt Holland and Zeeland more than Hanseatic cities, it was against Prussian interest to maintain it.

Georg Giese from Danzig, 34-year-old German Hanseatic merchant at the Steelyard, painted in London by Hans Holbein

In 1454, the year of the marriage of Elisabeth of Austria to King-Grand Duke Casimir IV Jagiellon of Poland-Lithuania, the towns of the Prussian Confederation rose up against the dominance of the Teutonic Order and asked Casimir IV for help. Danzig, Thorn and Elbing became part of the autonomous province of Royal Prussia in the Kingdom of Poland by the Second Peace of Thorn.

Poland in turn was heavily supported by the Holy Roman Empire through family connections and by military assistance under the Habsburgs. Kraków, then the Polish capital, had a loose association with the Hansa. The lack of customs borders on the River Vistula after 1466 helped to gradually increase Polish grain exports, transported down the Vistula, from 10,000 short tons (9,100 t) per year, in the late 15th century, to over 200,000 short tons (180,000 t) in the 17th century. The Hansa-dominated maritime grain trade made Poland one of the main areas of its activity, helping Danzig to become the Hansa's largest city. Polish kings soon began to reduce the towns' political freedoms.

Beginning in the mid-15th century, the Griffin dukes of Pomerania were in constant conflict over control of the Pomeranian Hanseatic towns. While not successful at first, Bogislaw X eventually subjugated Stettin and Köslin, curtailing the region's economy and independence.

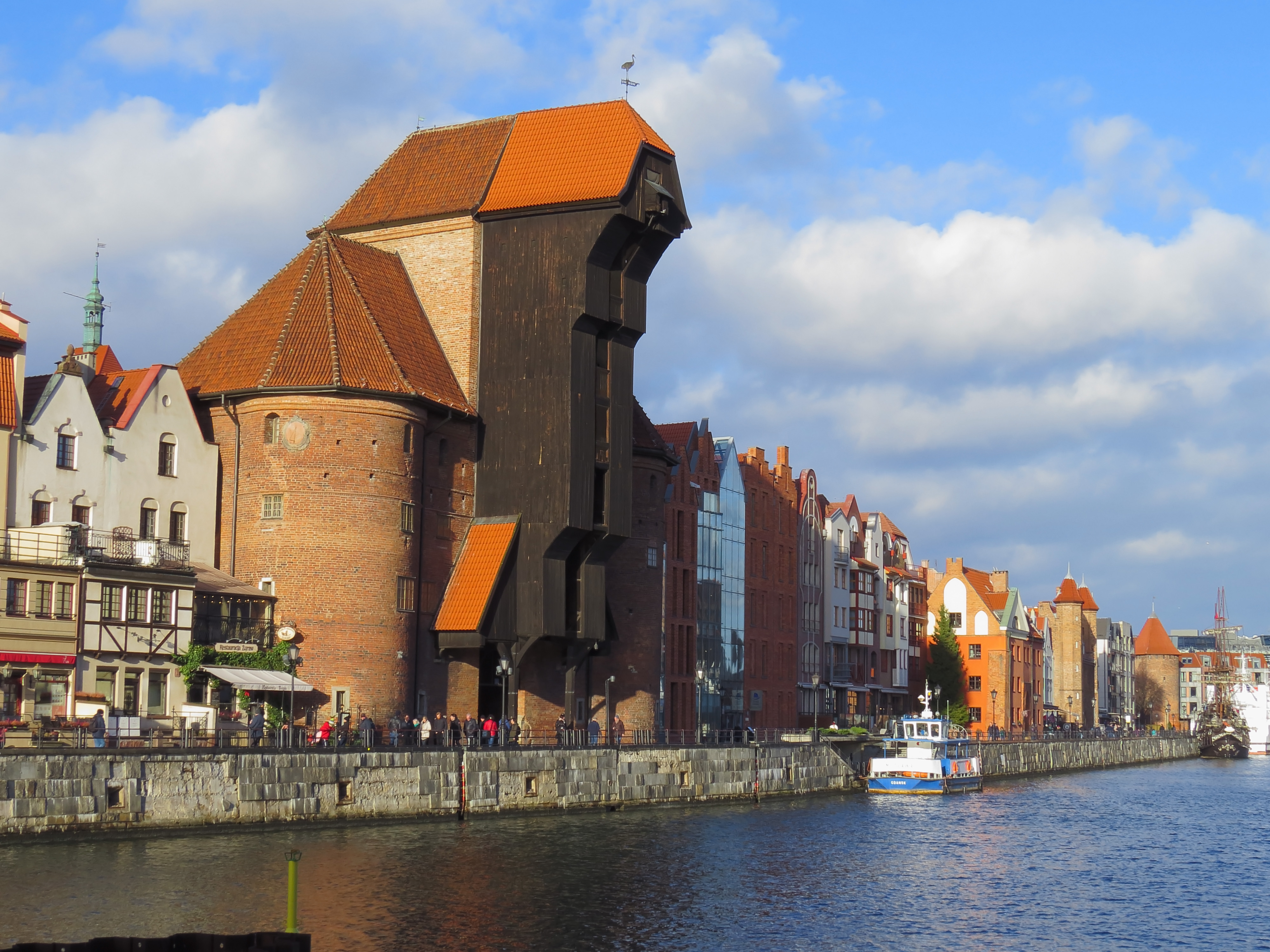
View of the Gdańsk Crane in the port city of Gdańsk (Danzig), today in Poland

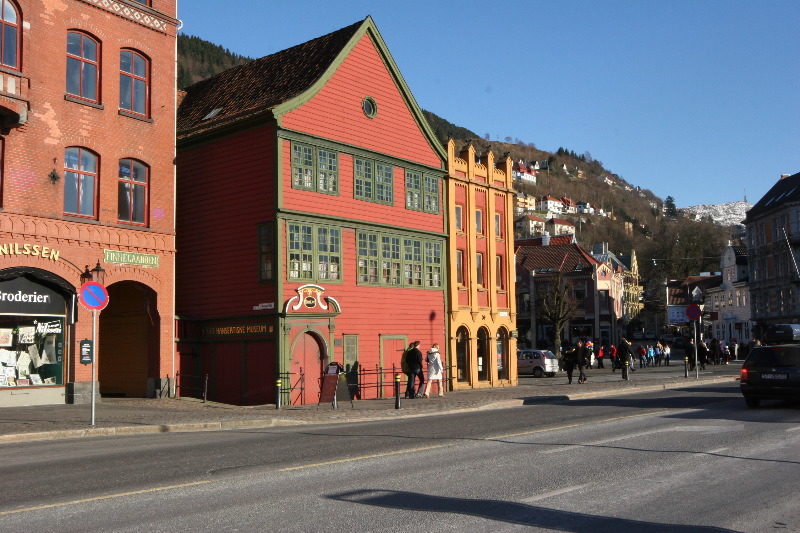
Hanseatic Museum and Schøtstuene in Bergen, Norway

A major Hansa economic advantage was its control of the shipbuilding market, mainly in Lübeck and Danzig. The league sold ships throughout Europe.

The economic crises of the late 15th century did not spare the Hansa. Nevertheless, its eventual rivals emerged in the form of territorial states. New vehicles of credit were imported from Italy.

When Flanders and Holland became part of the Duchy of Burgundy, Burgundian Dutch and Prussian cities increasingly excluded Lübeck from their grain trade in the 15th and 16th century. Burgund Dutch demand for Prussian and Livonian grain grew in the late 15th century. These trade interests differed from Wendish interests, threatening political unity, but also showed a trade where the Hanseatic system was impractical. Hollandish freight costs were much lower than the Hansa's, and the Hansa were excluded as middlemen. After naval wars between Burgundy and the Hanseatic fleets, Amsterdam gained the position of leading port for Polish and Baltic grain from the late 15th century onwards.

Nuremberg in Franconia developed an overland route to sell formerly Hansa-monopolised products from Frankfurt via Nuremberg and Leipzig to Poland and Russia, trading Flemish cloth and French wine in exchange for grain and furs from the east. The Hansa profited from the Nuremberg trade by allowing Nurembergers to settle in Hanseatic towns, which the Franconians exploited by taking over trade with Sweden as well. The Nuremberger merchant Albrecht Moldenhauer was influential in developing the trade with Sweden and Norway, and his sons Wolf and Burghard Moldenhauer established themselves in Bergen and Stockholm, becoming leaders of the local Hanseatic activities.

King Edward IV of England reconfirmed the league's privileges in the Treaty of Utrecht despite the latent hostility, in part thanks to the significant financial contribution the league made to the Yorkist side during the Wars of the Roses of 1455–1487. Tsar Ivan III of Russia closed the Hanseatic Kontor at Novgorod in 1494 and deported its merchants to Moscow, in an attempt to reduce Hanseatic influence on Russian trade. At the time, only 49 traders were at the Peterhof. The fur trade was redirected to Leipzig, taking out the Hansards; while the Hanseatic trade with Russia moved to Riga, Reval, and Pskov. The merchants explained to Lübeck that Pskov was not formally part of the Grand Principality of Moscow and therefore should not be subject to the trade blockade imposed on Moscow. When the Peterhof reopened in 1514, Novgorod was no longer a trade hub. In the same period, the burghers of Bergen tried to develop an independent intermediate trade with the northern population, against the Hansards' obstruction. The league's mere existence and its privileges and monopolies created economic and social tensions that often spilled onto rivalries between League members.

=== End of the Hansa ===
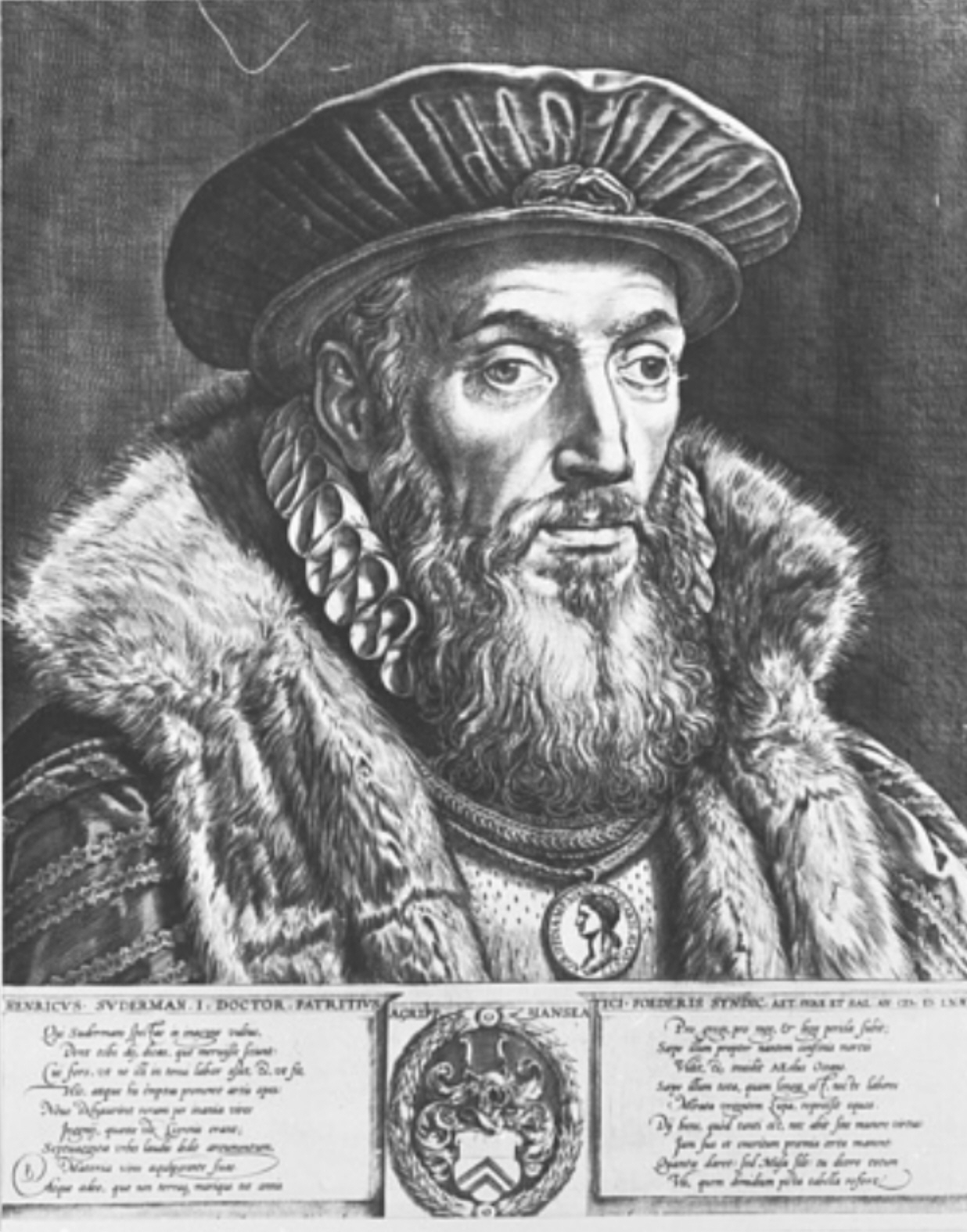
Heinrich Sudermann

The development of transatlantic trade after the discovery of the Americas caused the remaining contours to decline, especially in Bruges, because it centered on other ports. It also changed business practice to short-term contracts and obsoleted the Hanseatic model of privileged guaranteed trade.

The trends of local feudal lords asserting control over towns and suppressing their autonomy, and of foreign rulers repressing Hanseatic traders continued in the next century. The city of Kiel was expelled from the league in 1518 for harbouring pirates.

In the Swedish War of Liberation 1521–1523, the Hanseatic League was successful in opposition to an economic conflict it had over the trade, mining, and metal industry in Bergslagen (the main mining area of Sweden in the 16th century) with Jakob Fugger (industrialist in the mining and metal industry) and his unfriendly business take-over attempt. Fugger allied with his financially dependent Pope Leo X, Maximilian I, Holy Roman Emperor, and Christian II of Denmark/Norway. Both sides made costly investments in support of mercenaries to win the war. After the war, Gustav Vasa's Sweden and Frederick I's Denmark pursued independent policies and did not support Lübeck's effort against Dutch trade.

However, Lübeck under Jürgen Wullenwever overextended in the Count's Feud in Scania and Denmark and lost influence in 1536 after Christian III of Denmark's victory. Lübeck's attempts at forcing competitors out of the Sound eventually alienated even Gustav Vasa. Its influence in the Nordic countries began to decline.

The Hanseatic towns of Guelders were obstructed in the 1530s by Charles II, Duke of Guelders. Charles, a strict Catholic, objected to Lutheranism, in his words "Lutheran heresy", of Lübeck and other north German cities. This frustrated but did not end the towns' Hanseatic trade and a small resurgence came later.

Later in the 16th century, Denmark-Norway took control of the southern Baltic Sea. Sweden had regained control over its own trade, the Kontor in Novgorod had closed, and the Kontor in Bruges had become effectively moribund because the Zwin inlet was closing up. Finally, the growing political authority of the German princes constrained the independence of Hanse towns.

The league attempted to deal with some of these issues: it created the post of syndic in 1556 and elected Heinrich Sudermann to the position, who worked to protect and extend the diplomatic agreements of the member towns. In 1557 and 1579, revised agreements spelled out the duties of towns and some progress was made. The Bruges Kontor moved to Antwerp in 1520 and the Hansa attempted to pioneer new routes. However, the league proved unable to prevent the growing mercantile competition.

In 1567, a Hanseatic League agreement reconfirmed previous obligations and rights of league members, such as common protection and defense against enemies. The Prussian Quartier cities of Thorn, Elbing, Königsberg and Riga and Dorpat also signed. When pressed by the King of Poland–Lithuania, Danzig remained neutral and would not allow ships running for Poland into its territory. They had to anchor somewhere else, such as at Pautzke (Puck).

The Antwerp Kontor, moribund after the fall of the city, closed in 1593. In 1597 Queen Elizabeth I of England expelled the league from London, and the Steelyard closed and sequestered in 1598. The Kontor returned in 1606 under her successor, James I, but it could not recover. The Bergen Kontor continued until 1754; of all the Kontore, only its buildings, Bryggen, survive.

Not all states tried to suppress their cities' former Hanseatic links; the Dutch Republic encouraged its eastern former members to maintain ties with the remaining Hanseatic League. The States-General relied on those cities in diplomacy at the time of the Kalmar War.

The Thirty Years' War was destructive for the Hanseatic League and members suffered heavily from both the imperials, the Danes and the Swedes. In the beginning, Saxon and Wendish faced attacks because of the desire of Christian IV of Denmark to control the Elbe and Weser. Pomerania had a major population decline. Sweden took Bremen-Verden (excluding the city of Bremen), Swedish Pomerania (including Stralsund, Greifswald, Rostock) and Swedish Wismar, preventing their cities from participating in the league, and controlled the Oder, Weser, and Elbe, and could levy tolls on their traffic. The league became increasingly irrelevant despite its inclusion in the Peace of Westphalia.

In 1666, the Steelyard burned in the Great Fire of London. The Kontor-manager sent a letter to Lübeck appealing for immediate financial assistance for a reconstruction. Hamburg, Bremen, and Lübeck called for a Hanseatic Day in 1669. Only a few cities participated and those who came were reluctant to contribute financially to the reconstruction. It was the last formal meeting, unbeknownst to any of the parties. This date is often taken in retrospect as the effective end date of the Hansa, but the league never formally disbanded. It silently disintegrated.

=== Aftermath ===
The Hanseatic League, however, lived on in the public mind. Leopold I even requested Lübeck to call a Tagfahrt to rally support for him against the Turks.

Lübeck, Hamburg, and Bremen continued to attempt common diplomacy, although interests had diverged by the Peace of Ryswick. Nonetheless, the Hanseatic Republics were able to jointly perform some diplomacy, such as a joint delegation to the United States in 1827, led by Vincent Rumpff; later the United States established a consulate to the Hanseatic and Free Cities from 1857 to 1862. Britain maintained diplomats to the Hanseatic Cities until the unification of Germany in 1871. The three cities also had a common "Hanseatic" representation in Berlin until 1920.

Three kontors remained as, often unused, Hanseatic property after the league's demise, as the Peterhof had closed in the 16th century. Bryggen was sold to Norwegian owners in 1754. The Steelyard in London and the Oostershuis in Antwerp were long impossible to sell. The Steelyard was finally sold in 1852 and the Oostershuis, closed in 1593, was sold in 1862.

Hamburg, Bremen, and Lübeck remained as the only members until the league's formal end in 1862, on the eve of the 1867 founding of the North German Confederation and the 1871 founding of the German Empire under Kaiser Wilhelm I. Despite its collapse, they cherished the link to the Hanseatic League. Until German reunification, these three cities were the only ones that retained the words "Hanseatic City" in their official German names. Hamburg and Bremen continue to style themselves officially as "free Hanseatic cities", with Lübeck named "Hanseatic City". For Lübeck in particular, this anachronistic tie to a glorious past remained important in the 20th century. In 1937, the Nazi Party revoked its imperial immediacy through the Greater Hamburg Act. Since 1990, 24 other German cities have adopted this title.

== Organization ==
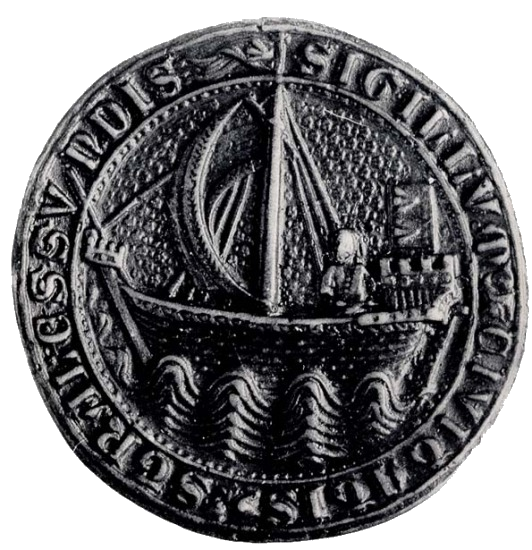
Hanseatic Seal of Stralsund

The Hanseatic League was a complex, loose-jointed constellation of protagonists pursuing their interests, which coincided in a shared program of economic domination in the Baltic region, and by no means a monolithic organization or a 'state within a state'. It gradually grew from a network of merchant guilds into a more formal association of cities, but never formed into a legal person.

League members were Low German-speaking, except for Dinant. Not all towns with Low German merchant communities were members (e.g., Emden, Memel (today Klaipėda), Viborg (today Vyborg), and Narva). However, Hansards also came from settlements without German town law—the premise for league membership was birth to German parents, subjection to German law, and commercial education. The league served to advance and defend its members' common interests: commercial ambitions such as enhancement of trade, and political ambitions such as ensuring maximum independence from the territorial rulers.

League decisions and actions were taken via a consensus-based procedure. If an issue arose, members were invited to participate in a central meeting, the Tagfahrt (Hanseatic Diet, "meeting ride", sometimes also referred to as Hansetag), that may have begun around 1300, and were formalized since 1358 (or possibly 1356). The member communities then chose envoys (Ratssendeboten) to represent their local consensus on the issue at the Diet. Not every community sent an envoy; delegates were often entitled to represent multiple communities. Consensus-building on local and Tagfahrt levels followed the Low Saxon tradition of Einung, where consensus was defined as the absence of protest: after a discussion, the proposals that gained sufficient support were dictated to the scribe and passed as binding Rezess if the attendees did not object; those favoring alternative proposals unlikely to get sufficient support remained silent during this procedure. If consensus could not be established on a certain issue, it was found instead in the appointment of league members empowered to work out a compromise.

The league was characterised by legal pluralism and the diets could not issue laws. But the cities cooperated to achieve limited trade regulation, such as measures against fraud, or worked together on a regional level. Attempts to harmonize maritime law yielded a series of ordinances in the 15th and 16th centuries. The most extensive maritime ordinance was the Ship Ordinance and Sea Law of 1614, but it may not have been enforced.

=== Kontors ===
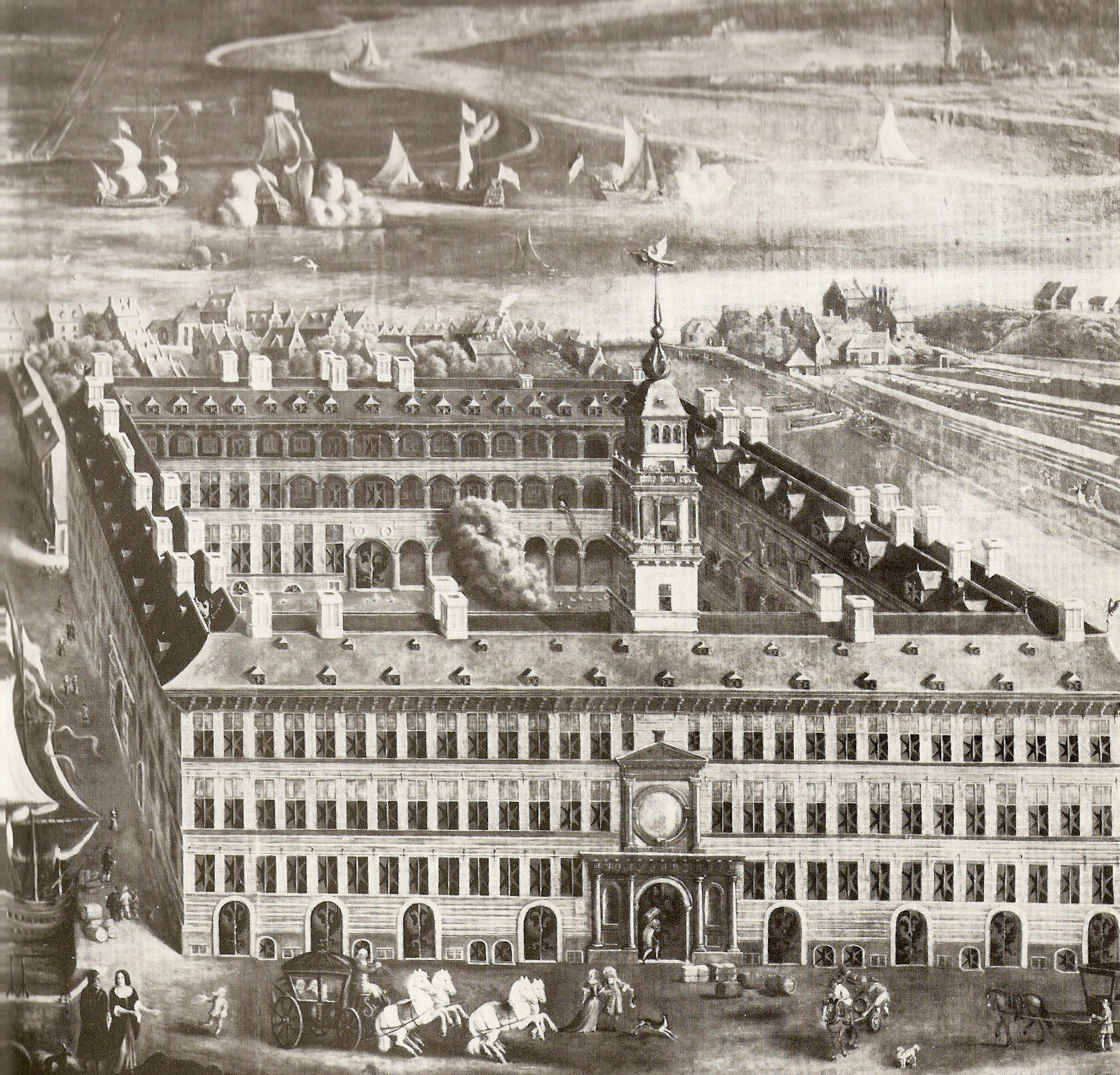
The Oostershuis, a kontor in Antwerp

A Hanseatic Kontor was a settlement of Hansards organized in the mid-14th century as a private corporation that had its treasury, court, legislation, and seal. They operated like an early stock exchange. Kontors were first established to provide security, but also served to secure privileges and engage in diplomacy. The quality of goods was also examined at Kontors, increasing trade efficiency, and they served as bases to develop connections with local rulers and as sources of economic and political information. (Note: Door de Kantoren werden er duurzame relaties met de machthebbers ter plaatse opgebouwd. Daaarnaast waren ze ook een onmisbare bron van informatie voor de Hanzesteden over de lokale politiek en handel. Bovendien waren de Kantoren plaatsen waar er controle was op de kwaliteit van goederen in de hanzeatische handel. Dit bevorderde de efficiëntie van deze handel. [...] Het midden van de veertiende eeuw wordt voor Brugge en Bergen als scharnierpunt in het ontstaan van de Kantoren gezien omdat ze toen een vastere organisatie en duidelijke regelgeving kregen. [...] Niettemin waren de Kantoren, in tegenstelling tot de Hanze als geheel, wel degelijk rechtsperonen. Als gevolg daarvan voerden ze eigen zegels, hadden ze een eigen administratie, een gemeenschappelijke kas en de machtsmiddelen om het correct naleven van de regels af te dwingen. The Kontors built lasting relationships with local ruler. In addition, they were also an indispensable source of information for the Hanseatic cities about local politics and trade. Moreover, the Kontors were places where the quality of goods in the Hanseatic trade was monitored. This promoted the efficiency of this trade. [...] The middle of the fourteenth century is seen as a pivotal point in the emergence of the Kontors for Bruges and Bergen, because they were then given a more permanent organization and clear regulations. [...] Nevertheless, unlike the Hanseatic League as a whole, the Kontors were indeed legal persons. As a result, they had their own seals, had their own administration, a common treasury and the means to enforce proper compliance with the rules (Wubs-Mrozewicz 2010, p. 91).) Most Kontors were also physical locations containing buildings that were integrated and segregated from city life to different degrees. The kontor of Bruges was an exception in this regard; it acquired buildings only as of the 15th century. Like the guilds, the Kontore were usually led by Ältermänner ("eldermen", or English aldermen). The Stalhof, a special case, had a Hanseatic and an English alderman. In Novgorod the aldermen were replaced by a hofknecht in the 15th century. The contours statutes were read aloud to the present merchants once a year.

In 1347 the Kontor of Bruges modified its statute to ensure an equal representation of League members. To that end, member communities from different regions were pooled into three circles (Drittel ("third [part]"): the Wendish and Saxon Drittel, the Westphalian and Prussian Drittel as well as the Gotlandian, Livonian and Swedish Drittel). Merchants from each Drittel chose two aldermen and six members of the Eighteen Men Council (Achtzehnmännerrat) to administer the Kontor for a set period.

In 1356, during a Hanseatic meeting in preparation for the first (or one of the first) Tagfahrt, the league confirmed this statute. All trader settlements including the Kontors were subordinated to the Diet's decisions around this time, and their envoys received the right to attend and speak at Diets, albeit without voting power. (Note: Rond dezelfde tijd werden ook alle nederzettingen formeel ondergeschikt aan de beslissingen van de Hanzedag. Hun vertegenwoordigers hadden sindsdien het recht om de Hanzevergaderingen bij te wonen en voor de belangen van de Kantoren en hun kooplieden te pleiten. Ze hadden er echter geen stemrecht. Around the same time, all settlements were also formally subordinated to the decisions of the Hanseatic League. Since then their representatives had the right to attend the Hanse meetings and to advocate for the interests of the Offices and their merchants. However, they had no voting rights (Wubs-Mrozewicz 2010, p. 91).)

=== Drittel ===
The league gradually divided the organization into three constituent parts called Drittel (German thirds), as shown in the table below.

Drittel (1356–1554)	Regions	Chief city (Vorort)
Wendish-Saxon	Holstein, Saxony, Mecklenburg, Pomerania, Brandenburg	Lübeck
Westphalian-Prussian	Westphalia, Rhineland, Prussia	Dortmund, later Cologne
Gotlandian-Livonian-Swedish	Gotland, Livonia, Sweden	Visby, later Riga

The Hansetag was the only central institution of the Hanseatic League. However, with the division into Drittel, the members of the respective subdivisions frequently held a Dritteltage ("Drittel meeting") to work out common positions which could then be presented at a Hansetag. On a more local level, league members also met, and while such regional meetings never crystallized into a Hanseatic institution, they gradually gained importance in the process of preparing and implementing the Diet's decisions.

=== Quarters ===
From 1554, the division into Drittel was modified to reduce the circles' heterogeneity, to enhance the collaboration of the members on a regional level and thus to make the league's decision-making process more efficient. The number of circles rose to four, so they were called Quartiere (quarters):

Quartier (since 1554)	Chief city (Vorort)
Wendish and Pomeranian	Lübeck
Saxon, Thuringian and Brandenburg	Brunswick, Magdeburg
Prussia, Livonia and Sweden – or East Baltic	Danzig (now Gdańsk)
Rhine, Westphalia and the Netherlands	Cologne

This division was however not adopted by the Kontore, who, for their purposes (like Ältermänner elections), grouped League members in different ways (e.g., the division adopted by the Stalhof in London in 1554 grouped members into Dritteln, whereby Lübeck merchants represented the Wendish, Pomeranian Saxon, and several Westphalian towns, Cologne merchants represented the Cleves, Mark, Berg and Dutch towns, while Danzig merchants represented the Prussian and Livonian towns).

== Hanseatic ships ==
Various types of ships were used.

=== Cog ===
The most used type, and the most emblematic, was the cog. The cog was a multi-purpose clinker-built ship with a carvel bottom, a stern rudder, and a square rigged mast. Most cogs were privately owned and were also used as warships. Cogs were built in various sizes and specifications and were used on both the seas and rivers. They could be outfitted with castles starting from the thirteenth century. The cog was depicted on many seals and several coats of arms of Hanseatic cities, like Stralsund, Elbląg and Wismar. Several shipwrecks have been found. The most notable wreck is the Bremen cog. It could carry a cargo of about 125 tons.

=== Hulk ===
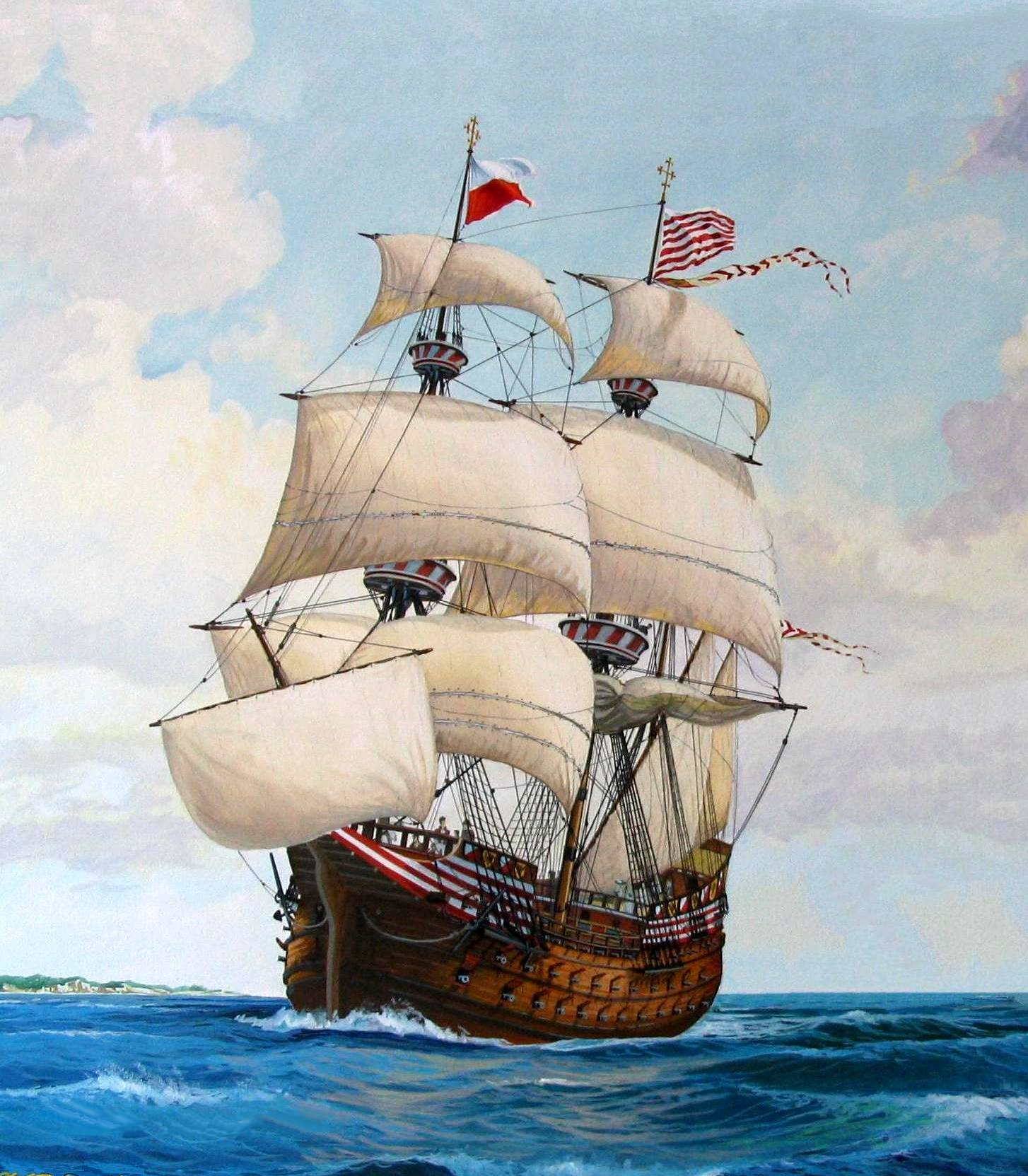
Modern, faithful painting of the Adler von Lübeck – the world's largest ship in its time

The hulk began to replace the cog by 1400 and cogs lost their dominance to them around 1450.

The hulk was a bulkier ship that could carry larger cargo; Elbl estimates they could carry up to 500 tons by the 15th century. It could be clinker or carvel-built. No archeological evidence of a hulk has been found.

=== Carvel ===
In 1464, Danzig acquired a French carvel ship through a legal dispute and renamed it the Peter von Danzig. It was 40 m long and had three masts, one of the largest ships of its time. Danzig adopted carvel construction around 1470. Other cities shifted to carvels starting from this time. An example is the Jesus of Lübeck, later sold to England for use as a warship and slave ship.

The galleonlike carvel warship Adler von Lübeck was constructed by Lübeck for military use against Sweden during the Northern Seven Years' War (1563–70). Launched in 1566, it was never put to military use after the Treaty of Stettin. It was the biggest ship of its day at 78 m long and had four masts, including a bonaventure mizzen. It served as a merchant ship until it was damaged in 1581 on a return voyage from Lisbon and broken up in 1588.

== Hanseatic cities ==
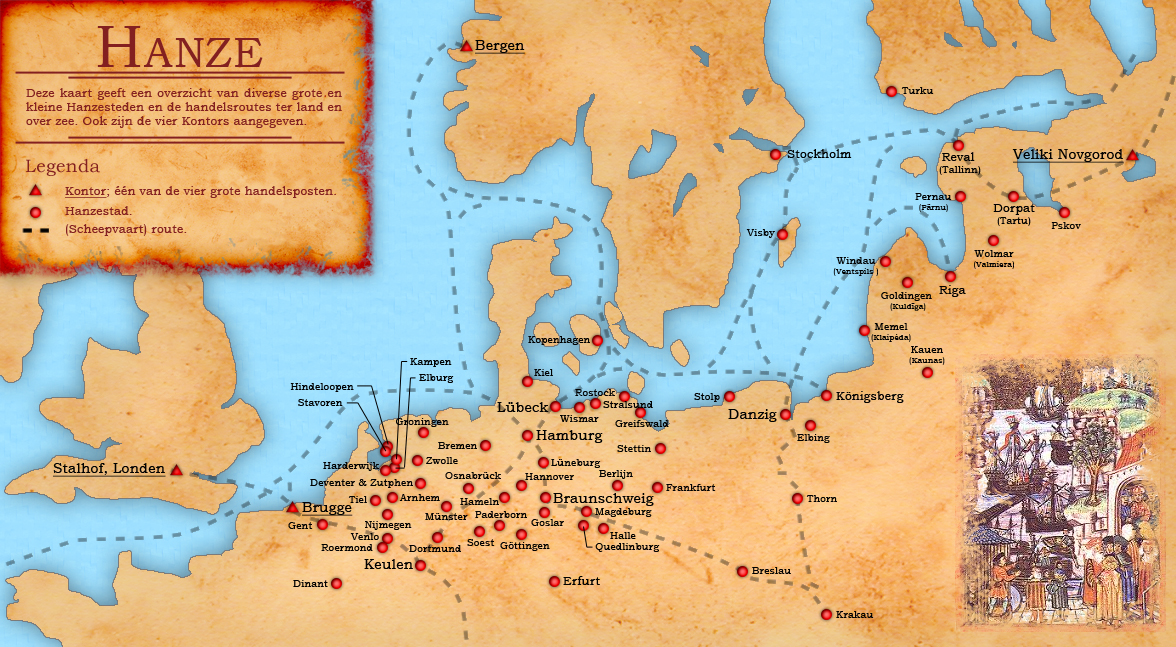
Map of the Hanseatic League, showing principal Hanseatic cities

=== Hansa Proper ===
In the table below, the names listed in the column labeled Quarter have been summarised as follows:

- "Wendish": Wendish and Pomeranian (or just Wendish) quarter
- "Saxon": Saxon, Thuringian and Brandenburg (or just Saxon) quarter
- "Baltic": Prussian, Livonian and Swedish (or East Baltic) quarter
- "Westphalian": Rhine-Westphalian and Netherlands (including Flanders) (or Rhineland) quarter

The remaining column headings are as follows:

- City – the city's name, with any variants
- Territory – the jurisdiction to which the city was subject at the time of the league
- Now – the modern nation-state in which the city is located
- From and Until – the dates at which the city joined and/or left the league
- Notes – additional details about the city
- Ref. – one or more references to works about the city
List of cities in Hansa Proper

Quarter	City	Territory	Now	From	Until	Notes	Ref.
Wendish	Lübeck	Free City of Lübeck	Germany			Capital of the Hanseatic League, the main town of the Wendish and Pomeranian Circle	
Wendish	Hamburg	Free City of Hamburg	Germany				
Wendish	Lüneburg	Duchy of Brunswick-Lüneburg	Germany				
Wendish	Wismar	Duchy of Mecklenburg	Germany			Joined the 10-year Rostock Peace Treaty (Rostocker Landfrieden) in 1283, which was the predecessor of the federation of Wendish towns (1293 onwards).	
Wendish	Rostock	Duchy of Mecklenburg	Germany			Joined the 10-year Rostock Peace Treaty in 1283, which was the predecessor of the federation of Wendish towns (1293 onwards).	
Wendish	Stralsund	Principality of Rügen	Germany	1293		Rügen was a fief of the Danish crown to 1325. Stralsund joined the 10-year Rostock Peace Treaty in 1283, which was the predecessor of the federation of Wendish towns (1293 onwards). From 1339 to the 17th century, Stralsund was a member of the Vierstädtebund with Greifswald, Demmin and Anklam.	
Wendish	Demmin	Duchy of Pomerania	Germany			Joined the 10-year Rostock Peace Treaty in 1283, which was the predecessor of the federation of Wendish towns (1293 onwards). From 1339 to the 17th century, Demmin was a member of the Vierstädtebund with Stralsund, Greifswald and Anklam.	
Wendish	Greifswald	Duchy of Pomerania	Germany			Joined the 10-year Rostock Peace Treaty in 1283, which was the predecessor of the federation of Wendish towns (1293 onwards). From 1339 to the 17th century, Greifswald was a member of the Vierstädtebund with Stralsund, Demmin and Anklam.	
Wendish	Anklam	Duchy of Pomerania	Germany			Joined the 10-year Rostock Peace Treaty in 1283, which was the predecessor of the federation of Wendish towns (1293 onwards). From 1339 to the 17th century, Anklam was a member of the Vierstädtebund with Stralsund, Greifswald and Demmin.	
Wendish	Stettin (Szczecin)	Duchy of Pomerania	Poland	1278		Joined the 10-year Rostock Peace Treaty in 1283, which was the predecessor of the federation of Wendish towns (1293 onwards); since the 14th century gradually adopted the role of a chief city for the Pomeranian Hanse towns to its east	
Wendish	Pasewalk	Duchy of Pomerania	Germany				
Wendish	Kolberg (Kołobrzeg)	Duchy of Pomerania	Poland				
Wendish	Rügenwalde (Darłowo)	Duchy of Pomerania	Poland				
Wendish	Stolp (Słupsk)	Duchy of Pomerania	Poland				
Wendish	Stargard	Duchy of Pomerania	Poland				
Baltic	Visby	Kingdom of Sweden	Sweden		1470	In 1285 at Kalmar, the league agreed with Magnus III, King of Sweden, that Gotland be joined with Sweden. In 1470, Visby's status was rescinded by the league, with Lübeck razing the city's churches in May 1525.	
Saxon	Braunschweig	Duchy of Brunswick-Lüneburg	Germany	13th cent.	17th cent.	Main town of the Saxon, Thuringian and Brandenburg Circle	
Saxon	Bremen	Free City of Bremen	Germany	1260			
Saxon	Magdeburg	Archbishopric of Magdeburg	Germany	13th cent.		Main town of the Saxon, Thuringian and Brandenburg Circle	
Saxon	Goslar	Imperial City of Goslar	Germany	1267	1566	Goslar was a fief of Saxony until 1280.	
Saxon	Hanover	Duchy of Brunswick-Lüneburg	Germany				
Saxon	Göttingen	Duchy of Brunswick-Lüneburg	Germany				
Saxon	Erfurt	Archbishopric of Mainz	Germany	1430			
Saxon	Stade	Archbishopric of Bremen	Germany				
Saxon	Berlin	Margraviate of Brandenburg	Germany		1442	Brandenburg was raised to an Electorate in 1356. Elector Frederick II caused all the Brandenburg cities to leave the league in 1442.	
Saxon	Frankfurt an der Oder	Margraviate of Brandenburg	Germany	1430	1442	Elector Frederick II caused all the Brandenburg cities to leave the league in 1442.	
Saxon	Salzwedel	Margraviate of Brandenburg	Germany	1263	1518	In 1488 the Hanseatic cities of the Altmark region rebelled against a beer tax against Elector of Brandenburg John Cicero. They lost and were punished by being forced to leave the Hanseatic League. Salzwedel and Stendal managed to stay in the Hanseatic League until 1518.	
Saxon	Uelzen	Duchy of Brunswick-Lüneburg	Germany				
Saxon	Stendal	Margraviate of Brandenburg	Germany	1358	1518	In 1488 the Hanseatic cities of the Altmark region rebelled against a beer tax against Elector of Brandenburg John Cicero. They lost and were punished by being forced to leave the Hanseatic League. Salzwedel and Stendal managed to stay in the Hanseatic League until 1518.	
Saxon	Hamelin		Germany				
Baltic	Danzig (Gdańsk)	Teutonic Order	Poland	1358		Main town of the Prussian, Livonian and Swedish (or East Baltic) Circle. Danzig had been first a part of the Duchy of Pomerelia with a Kashubian and a growing German population, then part of the State of the Teutonic Order from 1308 until 1457. After the Second Peace of Thorn (1466) Danzig became an autonomous city under the protection of the Polish Crown until the 18th century when it was annexed by Prussia.	
Baltic	Elbing (Elbląg)	Teutonic Order	Poland	1358		Elbing had originally been part of the territory of the Old Prussians, until the 1230s when it became part of the State of the Teutonic Order. After the Second Peace of Thorn (1466), Royal Prussia, including Elbląg was part of the Kingdom of Poland.	
Baltic	Thorn (Toruń)	Teutonic Order	Poland	1280		Toruń was part of the State of the Teutonic Order from 1233 until 1466. After the Second Peace of Thorn (1466), Royal Prussia, including Toruń, was part of the Kingdom of Poland.	
Baltic	Kraków	Kingdom of Poland	Poland	c. 1370	c. 1500	Kraków was the capital of the Kingdom of Poland, 1038–1596/1611. It adopted Magdeburg town law and 5000 Poles and 3500 Germans lived within the city proper in the 15th century; Poles steadily rose in the ranks of guild memberships reaching 41% of guild members in 1500. It was very loosely associated with Hansa, and paid no membership fees, nor sent representatives to League meetings.	
Baltic	Breslau, (Wrocław)	Kingdom of Bohemia	Poland	1387	1474	Breslau, a part of the Duchy of Breslau and the Kingdom of Bohemia, was only loosely connected to the league and paid no membership fees nor did its representatives take part in Hansa meetings	
Baltic	Culm (Chełmno)	Teutonic Order	Poland				
Baltic	Königsberg (Kaliningrad)	Teutonic Order	Russia	1340		Königsberg was the capital of the Teutonic Order, it accepted the sovereignty of the Polish crown in 1466. It became Ducal Prussia in 1525 after secularisation, a German principality that was a fief of the Polish crown until gaining its independence in the 1660 Treaty of Oliva. The city was renamed Kaliningrad in 1946 after East Prussia was divided between the People's Republic of Poland and the Soviet Union at the Potsdam Conference.	
Baltic	Riga	Archbishopric of Riga	Latvia	1282	1581	Archbishopric until 1561, Riga became a Free imperial city until the 1581 Treaty of Drohiczyn ceded the city to the Polish–Lithuanian Commonwealth.	
Baltic	Reval (Tallinn)	Teutonic Order	Estonia	1285		On joining the league, Reval was part the Kingdom of Denmark; it was sold in 1346 to the Teutonic Order. In 1561, the city became part of the Kingdom of Sweden.	
Baltic	Dorpat (Tartu)	Bishopric of Dorpat	Estonia	1280s	1558	The Bishopric of Dorpat ceased to exist in 1558 when the city was captured by Russian troops during the Livonian war.	
Baltic	Fellin (Viljandi)	Teutonic Order	Estonia				
Baltic	Pernau (Pärnu)	Teutonic Order	Estonia				
Baltic	Wenden (Cēsis)	Teutonic Order	Latvia				
Baltic	Kokenhusen (Koknese)	Teutonic Order	Latvia				
Baltic	Roop (Straupe)	Teutonic Order	Latvia				
Baltic	Windau (Ventspils)	Teutonic Order	Latvia				
Baltic	Lemsal (Limbaži)	Teutonic Order	Latvia				
Baltic	Wolmar (Valmiera)	Teutonic Order	Latvia				
Baltic	Goldingen (Kuldīga)	Teutonic Order	Latvia				
Westphalian	Cologne	Imperial City of Cologne	Germany		1669	Main town of the Rhine-Westphalian and Netherlands Circle until after the Anglo-Hanseatic War (1470–74), when the city was prosecuted in 1475 with temporary trade sanctions (German: Verhanst) for some years for having supported England; Dortmund was made main town of the Circle. Cologne also was called "Electorate of Cologne" (German: Kurfürstentum Köln or Kurköln). In June 1669 the last Hanseday was held in the town of Lübeck by the last remaining Hanse members, amongst others Cologne.	
Westphalian	Dortmund	Imperial City of Dortmund	Germany			After Cologne was excluded after the Anglo-Hanseatic War (1470–74), Dortmund was made the main town of the Rhine-Westphalian and Netherlands Circle.	
Westphalian	Dinant		Belgium				
Westphalian	Deventer	Bishopric of Utrecht	Netherlands		1500		
Westphalian	Nijmegen	Jülich-Guelders	Netherlands				
Westphalian	Kampen	Bishopric of Utrecht	Netherlands	1441			
Westphalian	Zwolle	Utrecht	Netherlands	1294			
Westphalian	Groningen	Friesland	Netherlands				
Westphalian	Roermond	Jülich-Guelders	Netherlands				
Westphalian	Arnhem	Jülich-Guelders	Netherlands				
	Bolsward	Frisia	Netherlands				
	Stavoren (Starum)	Frisia	Netherlands				
Westphalian	Doesburg	Jülich-Guelders	Netherlands				
Westphalian	Zutphen	Jülich-Guelders	Netherlands				
Westphalian	Harderwijk	Jülich-Guelders	Netherlands				
Westphalian	Venlo	Jülich-Guelders	Netherlands				
Westphalian	Hattem	Jülich-Guelders	Netherlands				
Westphalian	Elburg	Jülich-Guelders	Netherlands				
Westphalian	Ommen	Utrecht	Netherlands				
Westphalian	Tiel	Utrecht	Netherlands				
Westphalian	Hasselt	Utrecht	Netherlands				
Westphalian	Oldenzaal	Utrecht	Netherlands				
Westphalian	Zaltbommel	Jülich-Guelders	Netherlands				
Westphalian	Münster	Prince-Bishopric of Münster	Germany				
Westphalian	Osnabrück	Prince-Bishopric of Osnabrück	Germany	12th cent.			
Westphalian	Wesel		Germany				
Westphalian	Soest	Imperial City of Soest	Germany		1609	The city was a part of the Electorate of Cologne until acquiring its freedom in 1444–49, after which it aligned with the Duchy of Cleves.	
Westphalian	Paderborn		Germany				
Westphalian	Lemgo		Germany				
Westphalian	Herford		Germany				
	Minden		Germany				

=== Kontore ===
The kontore were the major foreign trading posts of the league, not cities that were Hanseatic members, and are listed in the hidden table below.

List of Hansa kontore

Quarter	City	Territory	Now	From	Until	Notes	Ref.
Kontor	Novgorod: Peterhof	Novgorod Republic	Russia		1500s	Novgorod was one of the principal Kontore of the league and the easternmost. In 1494, Ivan III, Grand Prince of Moscow, closed the Peterhof; it was reopened a few years later, but the league's Russian trade never recovered.	
Kontor	Bergen: Bryggen	Kingdom of Norway	Norway	1360	1775	Bryggen was one of the principal Kontore of the league. It was razed by accidental fire in 1476. In 1560, administration of Bryggen was placed under Norwegian administration.	
Kontor	Bruges: Hanzekantoor	County of Flanders	Belgium			Bruges was one of the principal Kontore of the league until the 15th century, when the seaway to the city silted up; trade from Antwerp benefiting from Bruges's loss.	
Kontor	London: Steelyard	Kingdom of England	United Kingdom	1303	1853	The Steelyard was one of the principal Kontore of the league. King Edward I granted a Carta Mercatoria in 1303. The Steelyard was destroyed in 1469 and Edward IV exempted Cologne merchants, leading to the Anglo-Hanseatic War (1470–74). The Treaty of Utrecht, sealing the peace, led to the league purchasing the Steelyard outright in 1475, with Edward having renewed the league's privileges without insisting on reciprocal rights for English merchants in the Baltic. London merchants persuaded Elizabeth I to rescind the league's privileges on 13 January 1598; while the Steelyard was re-established by James I, the advantage never returned. Consulates continued however, providing communication during the Napoleonic Wars, and the Hanseatic interest was only sold in 1853.	
Kontor	Antwerp: Oostershuis	Duchy of Brabant	Belgium			Antwerp became a major Kontor of the league, particularly after the seaway to Bruges silted up in the 15th century, leading to its fortunes waning in Antwerp's favour, despite Antwerp's refusal to grant special privileges to the league's merchants. Between 1312 and 1406, Antwerp was a margraviate, independent of Brabant.	

=== Vitten ===
The vitten were significant foreign trading posts of the league in Scania, not cities that were Hanseatic members, they are argued by some to have been similar in status to the kontors, and are listed in the hidden table below.

List of Hansa vitten

Quarter	City	Territory	Now	From	Until	Notes	Ref.
Vitte	Malmö	Kingdom of Denmark	Sweden	15th cent.		Skåne (Scania) was Danish until ceded to Sweden by the 1658 Treaty of Roskilde, during the Second Northern War.	
Vitte	Falsterbo	Kingdom of Denmark	Sweden	15th cent.		Skåne was Danish until ceded to Sweden by the 1658 Treaty of Roskilde, during the Second Northern War.	

=== Ports with Hansa trading posts ===
List of ports with Hansa trading posts

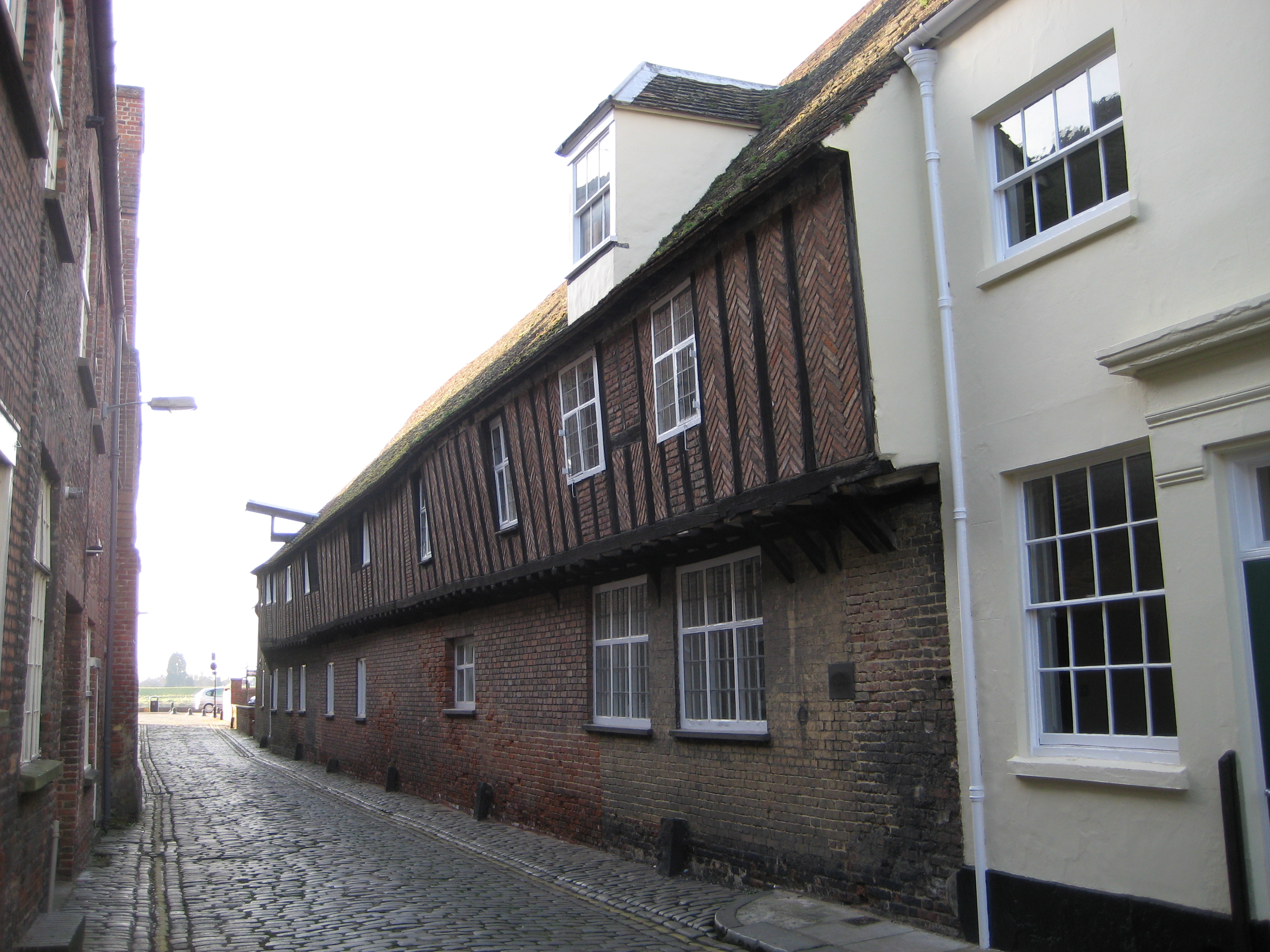
The Hanseatic Warehouse in King's Lynn is the only surviving League building in England.

- Åhus
- Berwick-upon-Tweed
- Bishop's Lynn (King's Lynn)
- Boston
- Bordeaux
- Bourgneuf
- Bristol
- Copenhagen
- Damme
- Frankfurt
- Ghent
- Hull (Kingston upon Hull)
- Ipswich
- Kalundborg
- Kaunas
- Landskrona
- La Rochelle
- Leith
- Lisbon
- Nantes
- Narva
- Næstved
- Newcastle
- Norwich
- Nuremberg
- Oslo
- Pskov
- Polotsk
- Rønne
- Scarborough
- Yarmouth (Great Yarmouth)
- Sluis
- Smolensk
- Tønsberg
- Venice
- Vilnius
- Vitebsk
- York
- Ystad

=== Other cities with a Hansa community ===
Other cities with a Hansa community
- Aberdeen
- Åbo (Turku)
- Avaldsnes
- Brae
- Grindavík
- Grundarfjörður
- Gunnister
- Hafnarfjörður
- Harlingen
- Haroldswick
- Hildesheim
- Hindeloopen (Hylpen)
- Kalmar
- Krambatangi
- Kumbaravogur
- Leghorn
- Lunna Wick
- Messina
- Naples
- Nordhausen
- Nyborg
- Nyköping
- Scalloway
- Stockholm
- Tórshavn
- Trondheim
- Tver
- Walk (Valka)
- Weißenstein (Paide)
- Wesenberg (Rakvere)

== Legacy ==
=== Historiography ===
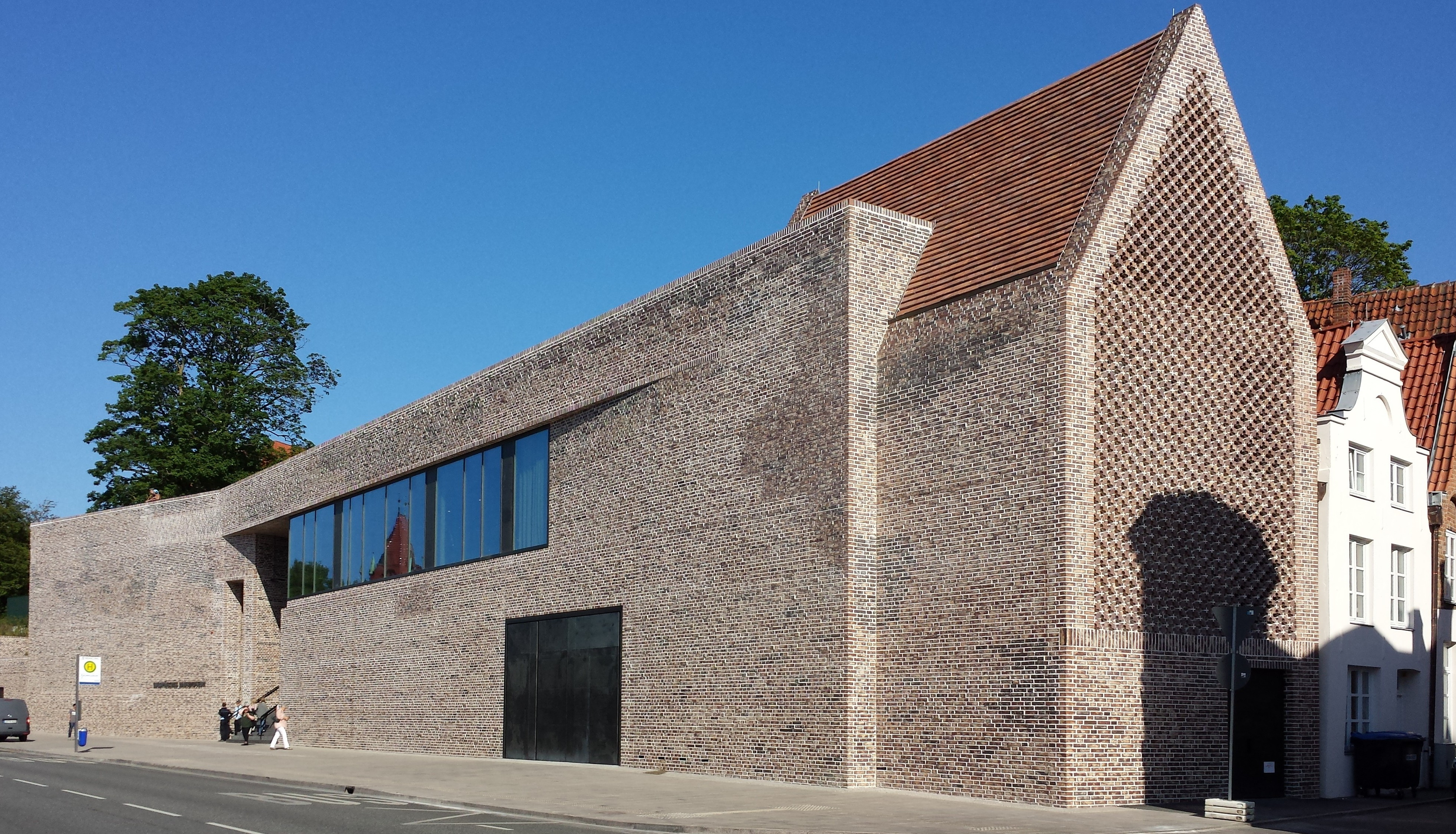
The European Hansemuseum in Lübeck

Academic historiography of the Hanseatic League is considered to begin with Georg Sartorius, who started writing his first work in 1795 and founded the liberal historiographical tradition about the league. The German conservative nationalist historiographical tradition was first published with F.W. Barthold's Geschichte der Deutschen Hansa of 1853/1854. The conservative view was associated with Little German ideology and came to predominate from the 1850s until the end of the First World War. Hanseatic history was used to justify a stronger German navy and conservative historians drew a link between the league and the rise of Prussia as the leading German state. This climate deeply influenced the historiography of the Baltic trade.

Issues of social, cultural and economic history became more important in German research after the First World War. But leading historian Fritz Rörig also promoted a National Socialist perspective. After the Second World War the conservative nationalist view was discarded, allowing exchanges between German, Swedish and Norwegian historians on the Hanseatic League's role in Sweden and Norway. Views on the league were strongly negative in the Scandinavian countries, especially Denmark, because of associations with German privilege and supremacy. Philippe Dollinger's book The German Hansa became the standard work in the 1960s. At that time, the dominant perspective became Ahasver von Brandt's view of a loosely aligned trading network. Marxist historians in the GDR were split on whether the league was a "late feudal" or "proto-capitalist" phenomenon.

Two museums in Europe are dedicated to the history of the Hanseatic League: the European Hansemuseum in Lübeck and the Hanseatic Museum and Schøtstuene in Bergen.

=== Popular views ===
From the 19th century, Hanseatic history was often used to promote a national cause in Germany. German liberals built a fictional literature around Jürgen Wullenwever, expressing fierce anti-Danish sentiment. Hanseatic subjects were used to propagate nation building, colonialism, fleet building and warfare, and the league was presented as a bringer of culture and pioneer of German expansion.

The preoccupation with a strong navy motivated German painters in the 19th century to paint supposedly Hanseatic ships. They used the traditions of maritime paintings and, not wanting Hanseatic ships to look unimpressive, ignored historical evidence to fictionalise cogs into tall two- or three-masted ships. The depictions were widely reproduced, such as on plates of Norddeutscher Lloyd. This misleading artistic tradition influenced public perception throughout the 20th century.

In the late 19th century, a social-critical view developed, where opponents of the league like the likedeelers were presented as heroes and liberators from economic oppression. This was popular from the end of the First World War into the 1930s, and survives in the Störtebeker Festival on Rügen, founded as the Rügenfestspiele by the GDR.

From the late 1970s, the Europeanness and cooperation of the Hanseatic League came to prominence in popular culture. It is associated with innovation, entrepreneurism and internationalness in economic circles. In this way it often used for tourism, city branding and commercial marketing. The league's unique governance structure has been identified as a precursor to the supranational model of the European Union.

=== Modern transnational organisations named after the Hanseatic League ===
==== Union of Cities THE HANSA ====
German language logo

In 1979, Zwolle invited over 40 cities from West Germany, the Netherlands, Sweden and Norway with historic links to the Hanseatic League to sign the recesses of 1669, at Zwolle's 750 year city rights' anniversary in August of the next year. In 1980, those cities established a "new Hanse" in Zwolle, named Städtebund Die Hanse (Union of Cities THE HANSA) in German and reinstituted the Hanseatic diets. This league is open to all former Hanseatic League members and cities that share a Hanseatic heritage.

In 2012, the city league had 187 members. This included twelve Russian cities, most notably Novgorod, and 21 Polish cities. No Danish cities had joined the Union although several qualify. The "new Hanse" fosters business links, tourism and cultural exchange.

The headquarters of the New Hansa is in Lübeck, Germany.

Dutch cities including Groningen, Deventer, Kampen, Zutphen and Zwolle, and a number of German cities including Bremen, Buxtehude, Demmin, Greifswald, Hamburg, Lübeck, Lüneburg, Rostock, Salzwedel, Stade, Stendal, Stralsund, Uelzen and Wismar now call themselves Hanse cities (the German cities' car license plates are prefixed H, e.g. –HB– for "Hansestadt Bremen").

Each year one of the member cities of the New Hansa hosts the Hanseatic Days of New Time international festival.

In 2006, King's Lynn became the first English member of the union of cities. It was joined by Hull in 2012 and Boston in 2016.

==== New Hanseatic League ====
In February 2018, a new small group of EU countries formed a monetary and economic working group called the New Hanseatic League. Finance ministers from Denmark, Estonia, Finland, Ireland, Latvia, Lithuania, the Netherlands and Sweden signed its foundational document which set out the countries' "shared views and values in the discussion on the architecture of the EMU".

=== Others ===
The legacy of the Hansa is reflected in several names: the German airline Lufthansa (lit. "Air Hansa"); F.C. Hansa Rostock, nicknamed the Kogge or Hansa-Kogge; Hansa-Park, one of the biggest theme parks in Germany; Hanze University of Applied Sciences in Groningen, Netherlands; Hanze oil production platform, Netherlands; the Hansa Brewery in Bergen and the Hanse Sail in Rostock; Hanseatic Trade Center in Hamburg; DDG Hansa, which was a major German shipping company from 1881 until its bankruptcy and takeover by Hapag-Lloyd in 1980; the district of New Hanza City in Riga, Latvia; and Hansabank in Estonia, which was rebranded as Swedbank.

== Historical maps ==
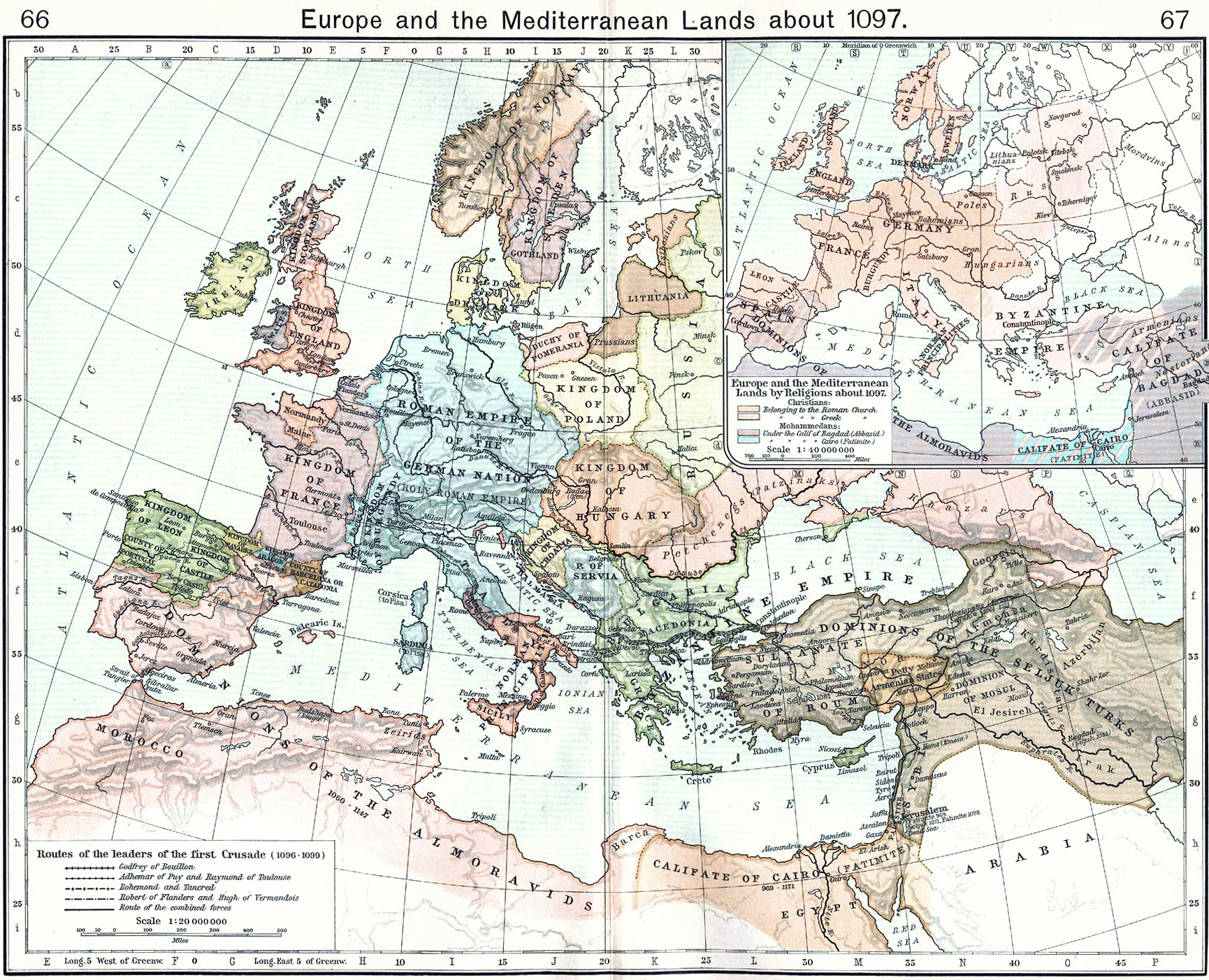
Europe in 1097

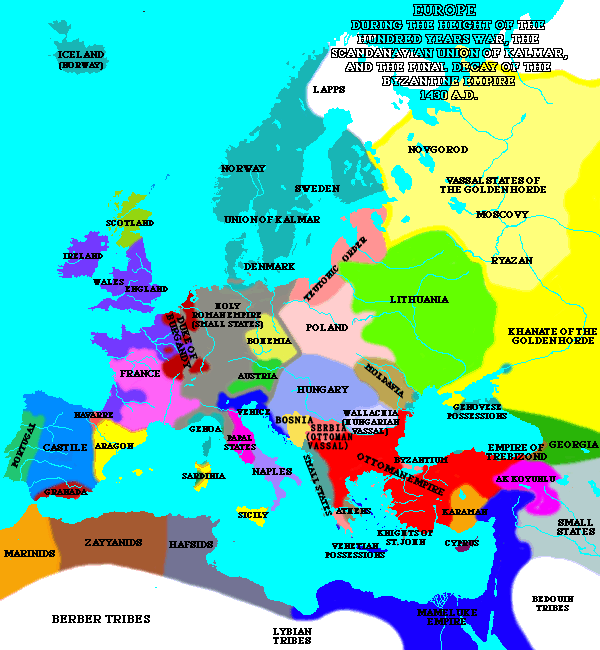
Europe in 1430

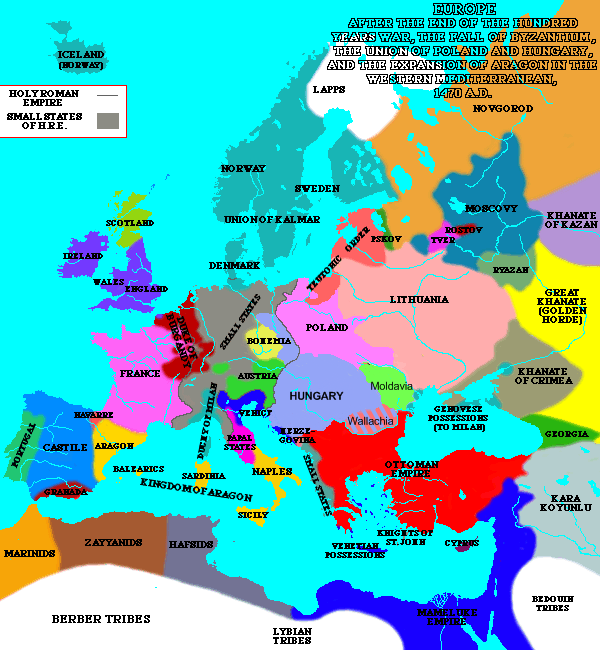
Europe in 1470

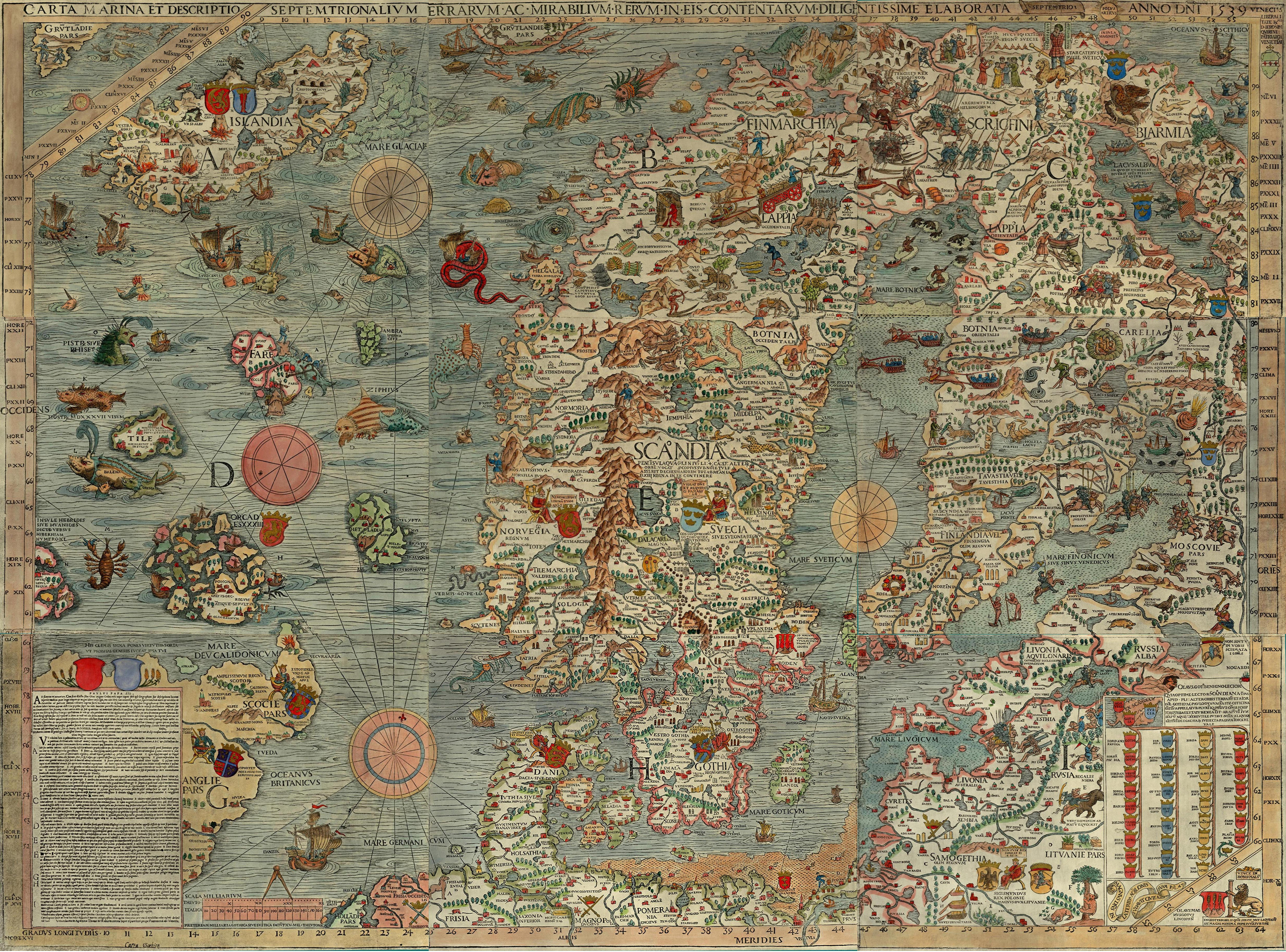
Carta marina of the Baltic Sea region (1539)

== In popular culture ==
- In the Patrician series of trading simulation video games, the player assumes the role of a merchant in any of several cities of the Hanseatic League.
- In the Saga of Seven Suns series of space opera novels by American writer Kevin J. Anderson, the human race has colonized multiple planets in the Spiral Arm, most of which are governed by the powerful Terran Hanseatic League (Hansa).
- Hansa Teutonica is a German board game designed by Andreas Steding and published by Argentum Verlag in 2009.
- In the Metro franchise of post-apocalyptic novels and video games, a trading alliance of stations called The Commonwealth of the Stations of the Ring Line is also known as the Hanseatic League, usually shortened to Hansa or Hanza.

== See also ==
- Baltic maritime trade (c. 1400–1800)
- Bay Fleet
- Brick Gothic
- Company of Merchant Adventurers of London
- Dithmarschen
- Hanseatic Cross
- Hanseatic Days of New Time
- Hanseatic flags
- Hanseatic Museum and Schøtstuene
- Hildebrand Veckinchusen
- History of Bremen (City)
- Maritime republics
- Peasants' Republic
- Schiffskinder
- Thalassocracy

== Sources ==
- Bandle, Oskar; Braunmüller, Kurt; Jahr, Ernst Håkon; Karker, Allan; Nauman, Hans-Peter; Teleman, Ulf, eds. (2005). The Nordic Languages: An International Handbook of the History of the North Germanic Languages (hardcover). Vol. 2 (1st ed.). Berlin, New York: Walter de Gruyter. ISBN 978-3-1101-7149-5.
- Brand, Hanno; Egge, Knol, eds. (2010). Koggen, kooplieden en kantoren: de Hanze, een praktisch netwerk [Cogs, merchants and offices: the Hanze, a practical network] (hardcover) (in Dutch) (1 ed.). Hilversum & Groningen: Uitgeverij Verloren & Groninger Museum. ISBN 978-90-8704-165-6. Archived from the original on 12 July 2024.
- Harreld, Donald J., ed. (2015). A Companion to the Hanseatic League. Brill's Companions to European History. Leiden, Boston: Brill. ISBN 978-90-04-28288-9.
- Lukin, Pavel V. (2022). "German Merchants in Novgorod: Hospitality and Hostility, Twelfth–Fifteenth Centuries". Baltic Hospitality from the Middle Ages to the Twentieth Century: Receiving Strangers in Northeastern Europe. Springer International Publishing. pp. 117–142. ISBN 978-3-030-98527-1.
- Pavlac, Brian A.; Lott, Elizabeth S., eds. (1 June 2019). "Hanseatic League". The Holy Roman Empire: A Historical Encyclopedia [2 volumes]. Bloomsbury Publishing USA. pp. 299–303. ISBN 979-8-216-09867-6.
- Vovin, Alexei; Krom, Mikhail (17 February 2017). "The city of Pskov in the fourteenth and fifteenth centuries: Baltic trade and institutional growt". In Blockmans, Wim; Krom, Mikhail; Wubs-Mrozewicz, Justyna (eds.). The Routledge Handbook of Maritime Trade around Europe 1300-1600: Commercial Networks and Urban Autonomy. Taylor & Francis. pp. 313–330. ISBN 978-1-315-27856-8.
