= Walton Turner =

English tanner and businessman

Walton Turner (died 1847) was an English tanner and businessman. In 1837 he was one of the founders of Bond, Turner & Hurwood, who set up the St Peters Works, an iron foundry and engineering works in College Street, Ipswich.

Walton Turner started his career as a leather merchant. Then in 1837 he became involved with George Hurwood in establishing the firm Bond, Turner & Hurwood. Two of his sons Edward Rush Turner and Frederick Turner both started their careers with apprenticeships at the company, and after gaining experience elsewhere they worked together, transforming their father's company into E R & F Turner.
