= George Hurwood =

English engineer (1798–1864)

George Hurwood (1798 - 1864) was an English engineer active in Ipswich, Suffolk. He played a major role in the installation and development of Ipswich Docks.

He was the son of William Hurwood, a millwright based in Ballingdon, near Sudbury. After an apprenticeship with his uncle, Samuel Wright, also a millwright, but based in Ipswich, George developed a broad range of skills. These he further developed through devoting much of his spare time to making working models of various machines including a model steam engine.

In 1842 Hurwood succeeded Henry Robinson Palmer running Ipswich Dock, when Palmer relinquished the post following he completion of the dock in 1842. In 1860 Hurwood gave a presentation about the River Orwell and the Port of Ipswich summarising the work of William Chapman and Palmer and subsequent developments following his appointment.
