= Orwell Bridge =

Bridge in Suffolk, England

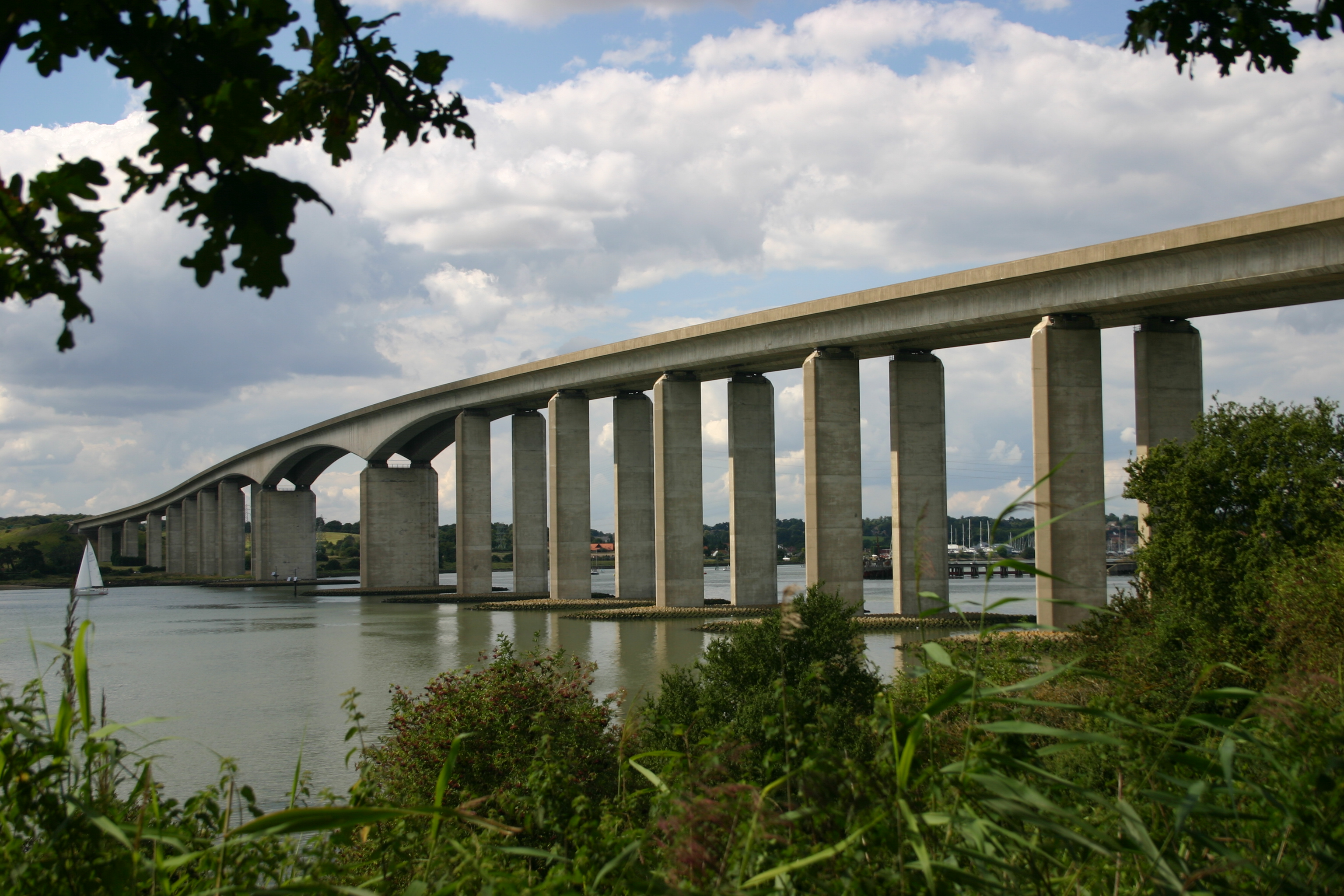
- The Orwell Bridge from Orwell Country Park
- Coordinates: 52.026909°N 1.16449°E
- OS grid reference: TM163445
- Carries: Motor vehicles (A14 and A12)
- Crosses: River Orwell (Freston Reach), B1456
- Locale: Ipswich (east) and Wherstead (west)
- Maintained by: National Highways
- Preceded by: Stoke Bridge

Characteristics
- Design: Twin box girder bridge
- Material: Pre-stressed reinforced concrete
- Total length: 1,287 metres (4,222 ft)
- Width: 24 metres (79 ft)
- Height: 43 metres (141 ft)
- Longest span: 190 metres (620 ft)
- No. of spans: 18

History
- Architect: Frederick Gibberd Partners
- Engineering design by: Sir William Halcrow & Partners
- Constructed by: Stevin Construction B.V.
- Fabrication by: Høsveis & Bofa
- Construction start: October 1979
- Construction end: April 1982
- Construction cost: £23.6m
- Inaugurated: 17 December 1982

Location
- Interactive map of Orwell Bridge

The Orwell Bridge is a concrete box girder bridge just south of Ipswich in Suffolk, England. Opened to road traffic in 1982, the bridge carries the A14 road (formerly the A45) over the River Orwell.

== History ==
=== Design ===
The main span is 190 metres which, at the time of its construction, was the longest pre-stressed concrete span in use in the UK. The two spans adjacent to the main span are 106m, known as anchor spans. Most of the other spans are 59m. The total length is 1,287 metres from Wherstead to the site of the former Ipswich Airport. The width is 24 metres with an air draft of 43 metres; the bridge had to be at least 41 metres high. The approach roads were designed by CH Dobbie & Partners of Cardiff, later bought by Babtie, Shaw and Morton then Jacobs in 2004.

The bridge is constructed of a pair of continuous concrete box girders with expansion joints that allow for expansion and contraction. The girders are hollow, allowing for easier inspection, as well as providing access for services, including telecom, power, and a 711mm water main from the nearby Alton Water reservoir. The necessary inspections still cause major disruption to traffic every six years; during the inspection in the summer of 2005, the delays caused by lane closures and speed restrictions added between 30 and 60 minutes to journey times during the peak commuting periods.

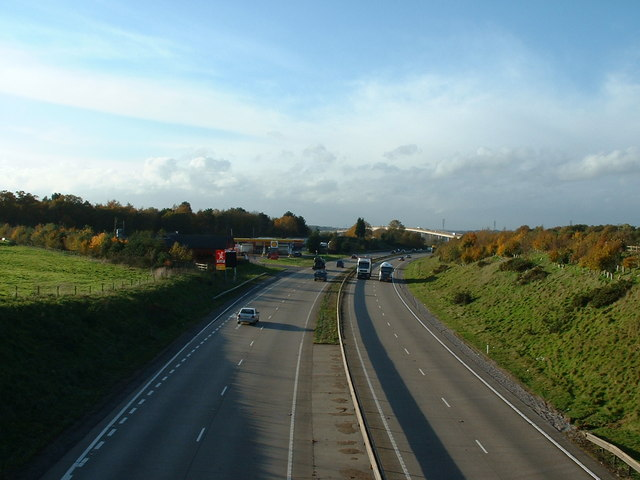
Approach from the east in November 2006, north of Orwell Country Park at the Shell Orwell services

The bridge design took into consideration the impact on the Orwell Estuary, as well as the needs of the port of Ipswich. The location close to the southern edge of Ipswich was deemed convenient for the industrial areas of the West Bank Terminal and Ransomes Industrial Estate on the eastern end. The bridge was set at an angle to the river to get the best relationship to the surrounding terrain.

The air draft of the central span was chosen to be as low as possible without adversely affecting port operations. Although some have said that the resulting hump affects visibility and road safety, there have not been enough incidents causing injury for the Highways Agency to identify it for greater detailed investigation and possible amendments. The consulting engineers were Sir William Halcrow and Partners. Frederick Gibberd Partners worked on the project to ensure the bridge was as sympathetic as possible to its surroundings, with the final design winning the approval of the Royal Fine Art Commission.

The Department for Transport funded the project and, partly because of the bridge, paid for radars and cameras to be installed at the port's Orwell Navigation Service to monitor the river and the bridge.

=== Construction ===
Pilings were sunk 40 metres into the river bottom; Pigott Foundations of Ormskirk drilled 1142 piles; the main contractor of the substructure was Stevin Construction B.V., a Dutch company. The main span was constructed using a balanced cantilever technique, casting sections on alternating sides of the pier in a weekly cycle. Høsveis & Bofa of Hønefoss in Norway helped form the box girder (steelwork). The roller bearings were from Maurer AG of Germany. Mageba UK (Swiss) of Bicester supplied the bridge bearings and expansion joints. The pre-stressed concrete box girder sections had VSL tendons and GKN super-strand wire rope. The construction gantries were fabricated by Fairfield Mabey.

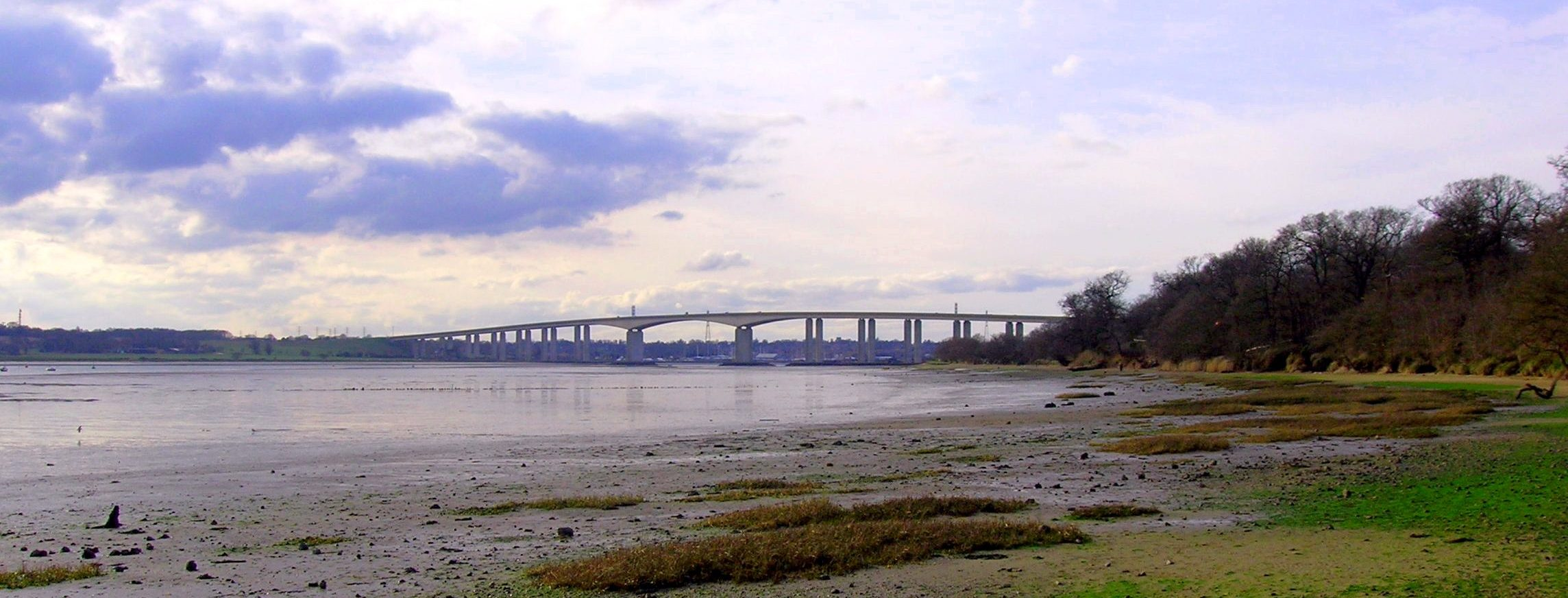
View in March 2010

It was part of the first section of the Ipswich Bypass; the contracts for the approach roads were given to Costain (£10.7m, eastern) and Cementation (£9.3m, western). For this section of the bypass, Robert McGregor & Sons, subcontracting to Cementation laid 6,900m of concrete in 48 days with a slipform paver; Costain laid 10,400m of concrete in 31 days with a concrete train.

Construction of the bridge began in October 1979 and was completed 1 April 1982. It was opened on 17 December 1982 by David Howell, Baron Howell of Guildford, then the Secretary of State for Transport.

=== Maintenance ===
Bridge bearing replacement works were carried out by Jackson Civil Engineering Ltd over the weekend of 11–14 February 2011, during a 52-hour closure of the north deck, carrying the eastbound A14. The new bridge bearings were designed and manufactured by the engineering company, Freyssinet Ltd.

In February 2014, a meeting of various agencies was held to review diversions when it is necessary for the A14 and Orwell Bridge to be closed.

=== Speed limit ===
A permanent reduced speed limit of 60 mph was introduced in November 2015 for safety reasons.

Due to high side-winds, the bridge is often closed during storms. To reduce closure time and the pressure it imposes on local roads, in 2021 Highways England installed electronic variable speed limits on the bridge and the approaches each side. During certain high winds conditions, rather than closing the bridge, the speed limit can be reduced from 60 mph to 40 mph.

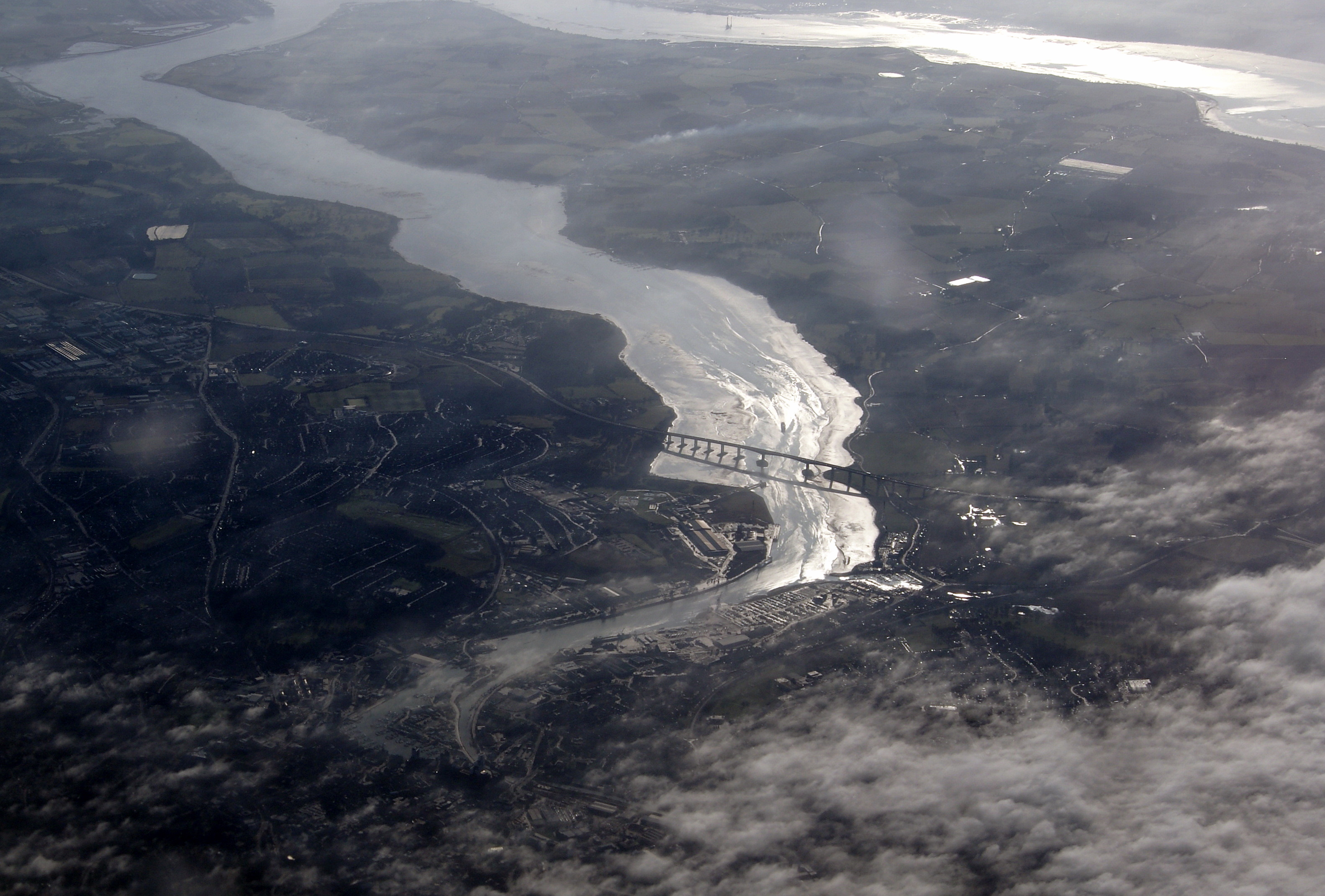
View from the air in February 2010 from an aircraft en route to Stansted from Prague

== Structure ==
The Stour and Orwell Walk passes under the bridge.

=== Usage ===
As of 2006 the bridge was used by 60,000 vehicles per day, about 83% of its capacity. In 2006 it was predicted that the bridge is expected to be running over capacity by 2015. By 2023, traffic levels had exceeded 67,500 vehicle per day.

== Incidents ==
=== Total closures ===
When the bridge is closed in both directions for more than a short period of time, normally as a safety precaution due to high winds, most of Ipswich's roads are brought to a near-standstill by diverted traffic.

Date	Duration (hours)	Reason	Note
16 October 2026	14 Hours, 22 minutes	Traffic Collision	Fatal crash
27 April 2026	12 Hours, 30 minutes	Traffic Collision	Fatal crash including a Ford S-Max and HGV.
1 December 2023	12 hours	Roadworks	A vehicle carrying survey equipment on the Orwell Bridge during road works had a failed hydraulic unit, which had an extending platform, which was stuck under the bridge's surface. A maintenance truck had to be called in from Yorkshire, which caused the worst traffic delays to date in Ipswich.
18 February 2022	12 hours	High winds	Storm Eunice
30 April 2019	1.5 hours	Police Incident	
16 March 2019	4 hours	High winds	
13 March 2019	8 hours	High winds	Storm Gareth
29 November 2018	4 hours	High winds	
24 January 2018	5+ hours	High winds	Storm Georgina
18 January 2018	3 hours	High winds	Storm Fionn
3 January 2018	17 hours	High winds	Storm Eleanor
20 October 2017	8 hours	Traffic collision	Fatal crash (6:45am to 2:50pm)
23 February 2017	5+ hours	High winds	Storm Doris
22 November 2016	5+ hours	High winds	Storm Angus
28 March 2016	5+ hours	High Winds	Storm Katie
1 July 2015	0–1 hours	Suicide / Attempted Suicide	
15 April 2015	1-1.5 hours	Road Traffic Collision	
16 December 2014	1-1.5 hours	Pedestrian	
29 October 2014	0–1 hours	Suicide / Attempted Suicide	
21 July 2014	0–1 hours	Suicide / Attempted Suicide	
13 June 2014	0–1 hours	Pedestrian	
14 February 2014	5+ hours	High winds	2013–14 United Kingdom winter floods
28 October 2013	5+ hours	High winds	St. Jude storm
4 March 2012	5+ hours	Road Traffic collision	Bridge closed from 8pm on 4th to 3am on 5th.

== Popular culture ==
The bridge appears in the 1987 Cold War drama The Fourth Protocol, in which two RAF helicopters are shown flying under it, and at the end of the 2013 film The Numbers Station.

The bridge appears in the background of a 2001 advert for the AA motoring recovery service.

In 2026, the bridge is featured in episode 5 (season 6) of the Apple TV spy series Slow Horses. Walking Post
