= Kontor of Bruges =

Hanseatic kontor

The Kontor of Bruges was the Hanseatic kontor, one of the Hanseatic League's four major trading posts, in Bruges, County of Flanders. A kontor was a corporation (universitas) with a level of legal autonomy in a foreign non-Hanseatic city, the one of Bruges was formally organised in the 14th century. Bruges was a major Flemish port in the high and late Middle Ages. Flanders was a fiefdom of France until the Treaty of Senlis was signed in 1493, after that it belonged to the Holy Roman Empire.

The main trading good in Bruges was Flemish broadcloth, and other Flemish cloths, but Bruges was a cosmopolitan city with merchants from many parts of Europe and the Mediterranean so the selection of available goods in Bruges was large. In addition the presence of a kontor meant there was a Hanseatic staple in cloth and certain imported goods. The Kontor of Bruges stood out because the Hanseatic League's activity wasn't concentrated on a few buildings and Hansards instead were spread over the town. A special building was only acquired in the 15th century. As a result, Bruges had the most integrated kontor. Another way that the kontor stood out was that it was often moved away to other places when there were conflicts with the city or the county.

Bruges did not lie directly next to the North Sea but was reached by the Zwin, a tidal inlet that was formed by a storm in 1134. The ports Damme and Sluis lay on the inlet and gave access to Bruges. The Zwin began to progressively silt up in the 13th century. It harmed trade by the middle 15th century and in the 16th century the Hanseatic League decided to move the kontor to Antwerp, where the Oostershuis was built for it.

== History ==
In 1134 a storm broke through the Flemish coast and created the tidal inlet the Zwin. It made Bruges the only Flemish cloth town with access to the North Sea. Bruges' first port was Damme and water transport could reach Bruges over the river Reie and other channels.

=== Beginning of Hanseatic trade ===
Traders from cities that later made up the Hanseatic League seem to have come to Bruges from the first half of the 13th century. The traders didn't acquire any real estate to establish themselves, but rented lodging and storage from locals. The canteen of the Carmelite monastery, where the Hansards went to church, could be rented for meetings if it was necessary. In 1252 countess Margaret of Flanders and her son Guy of Flanders granted two sets of privileges to Holy Roman traders, one to a group based around Hamburg and one to a Rhenish-Westphalian grouping including Cologne. The latter requested an emporium-enclave near Damme, but this was fatefully denied: Bruges wanted to secure a key position over nearby towns and villages and couldn't use new potential rivals.

Conflict arose in the late 1270s about irregularities in weighing and the increase of certain duties. Not only the Hanse objected, but also Spanish and south French merchants. The League moved the kontor temporarily to Aardenburg in 1280, supported by the count of Flanders. It was however an unfavourable location. Lübeck seems to have played a prime role in the negotiations that began in 1281. The kontor returned in 1282.

A progressive process of silting up the Zwin began in the 13th century.

It was impossible for larger ships to call at Damme anymore by the 14th century, the port for these ships moved to Sluis. Bruges made large investments in an ultimately vain effort to keep the trade route open.

New complaints arose about weighing and monetary issues in 1307 or 1308. Again Aardenburg and the count of Flanders facilitated a temporary relocation of the kontor. Brunswick, Goslar and Magdeburg led negotiations. The kontor returned in 1310, the Hansards acquired the right to their own meetings and to issue and enforce internal ordinances.

=== Reform of the kontor and height of the kontor's influence ===
The Kontor of Bruges was institutionally reformed in 1347, in a way that would be very influential. It pioneered a division of Hansards in three parts, a reform that would be adopted by Hanseatic League itself and by the Steelyard in London.

Again concerns about weighing, arbitrary tax increases, compensations and privileges moved the League in 1350 to relocate the kontor to Aardenburg, against the backdrop of the Hundred Years' War, but this wasn't carried out. A diet convened in 1356 to discuss the matter but negotiations led nowhere. The Hanseatic diet called a blockade against Flanders in January 1358. Duke Albert I of Bavaria, Hainaut, Holland and Zeeland offered attractive terms, and the kontor was moved to Dordt in May 1358. The blockade nearly caused a famine despite imperfect compliance by the Hansards. Count Louis II extended Hanseatic privileges to the whole of Flanders.

But the context of the Hundred Years' War made it difficult for Bruges to keep the generous terms of the agreement and customs were raised. An attempt to move the kontor out in the winter 1377/1378 failed. Count Louis II supported Bruges. Worserning war conditions and a revolt in Ghent drove the merchants away, so few were around at the time of the Battle of Roosebeke. Louis died in 1384 and the League opened negotiations with the new count, Philip the Bold. Excessive demands by the Hanse's representatives made negotiations fail. The kontor temporarily moved to Dordrecht in 1388, again invited by Albert I. A total Hanseatic embargo was placed on Flanders, it was only lightened in 1389 to allow the Teutonic Order to sell amber. Intervention by the Prussian towns and the grand master of the Teutonic Knights enabled a resolution in late 1391. The Hanseatic privileges were restored and the merchants received a large compensation.

=== Beginning of decline ===
Bruges' importance for Hanseatic trade fell quickly after the embargo was resolved in 1392, especially affecting the cloth trade. Hansards began to look for other sources, like England.

After 1390 Europe faced its first great scarcity of precious metal in centuries. The council of Bruges became convinced that the shortage was caused by hoarding by foreign merchants and issued an ordinance in September 1399 that required that credit was paid in cash with increasing shares of gold from 1 May 1400 and reaching full force on 1 January 1401. The ordinance caused an acute shortage of cash and made credit volatile in Bruges. The Kontor of Bruges and Lübeck cooperated to instate a total ban on credit for Hanseatic traders on Flanders for 3 years from 2 July 1401.

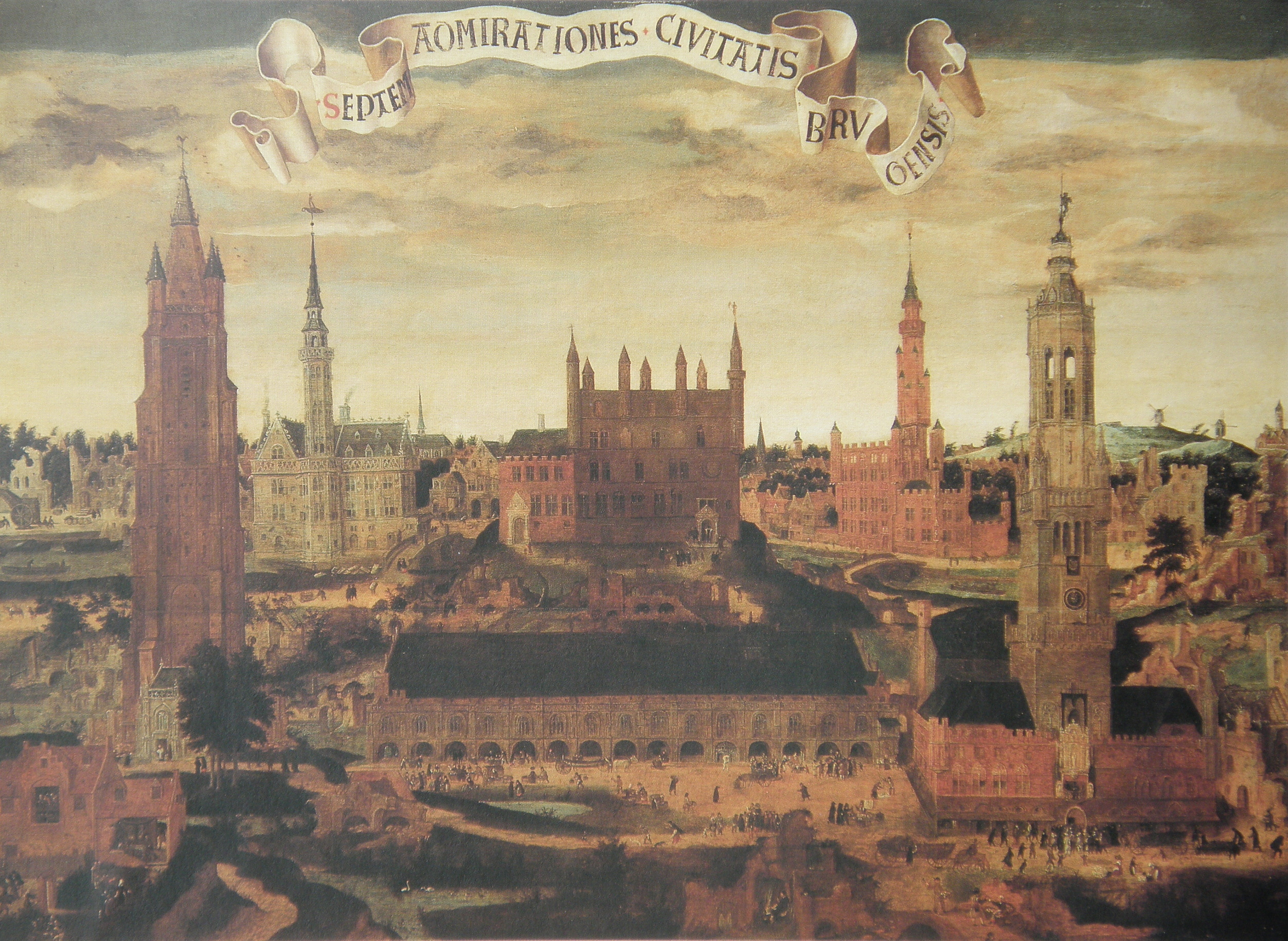
The Seven Wonders of Bruges by Pieter Claeissens the Elder. The orange building with the tower in the right background is the Oosterlingenhuis. The tip of the tower was destroyed in 1582 in a fire.

When Philip the Good, duke of Burgundy and overlord of Bruges, switched sides to France in the Hundred Years' War with the Treaty of Arras, political attitudes changed. Accused of English loyalties, 80 German merchants were killed in June 1436 at Sluis. The kontor was moved to Antwerp and a blockade again created a famine in Bruges, and the kontor returned after a renewal of the privileges.

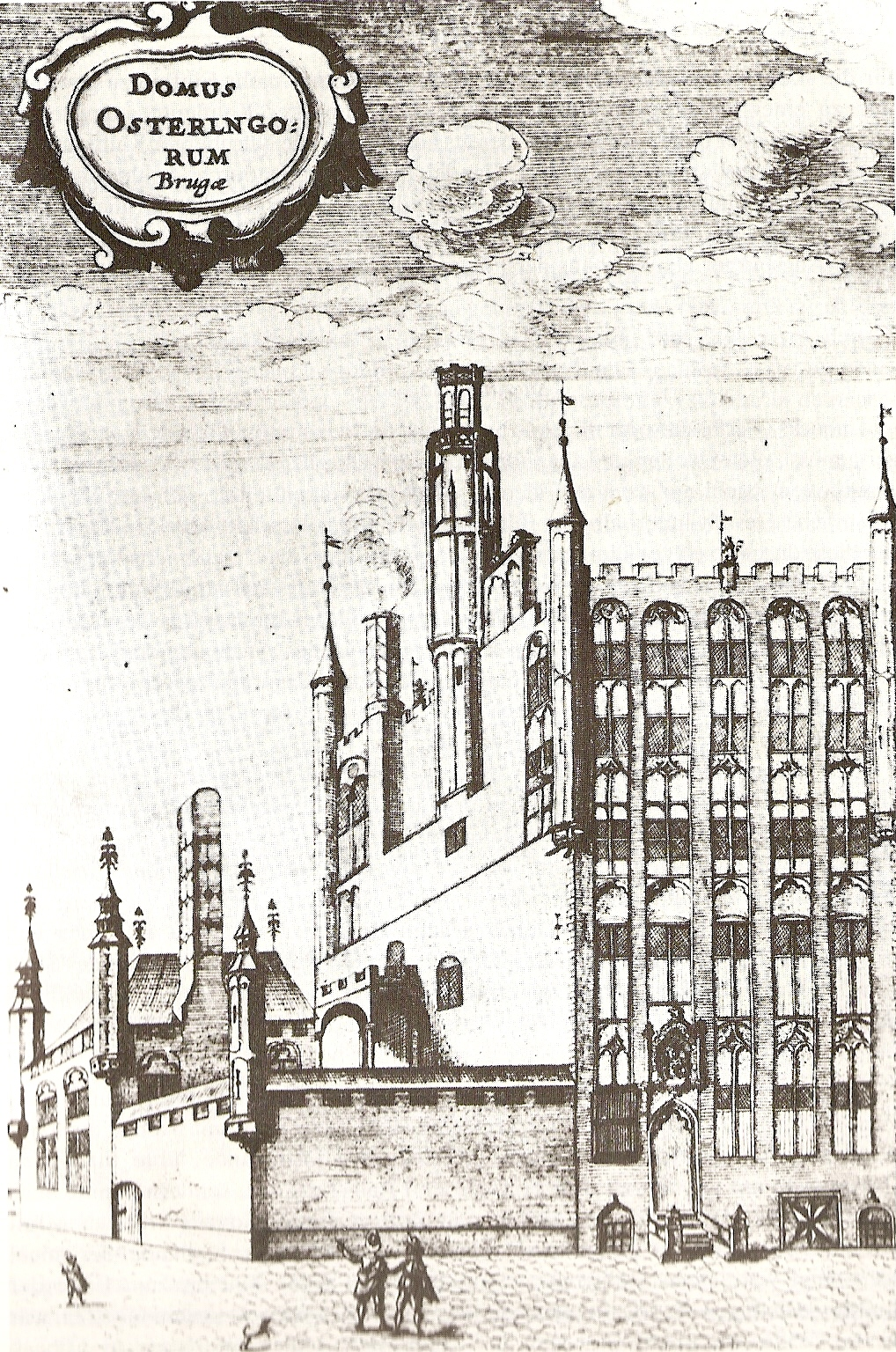
The Oosterlingenhuis in the 17th century

=== Construction of kontor buildings ===
The Hansards rented the Oosterlingenhuis ("Easterling house", it refers to Germans) from 1442 as their own guildhall. In 1478 its new guildhall buildings at the Oosterlingenplein were completed. But the kontor continued to use the canteen of the monastery of the Carmelite order. The monastery hasn't survived, while the façade of the Oosterlingenhuis doesn't exist anymore.

Renewed complaints about breaches against privileges motivated the Hanseatic League to increase the economic power of the staple by expanding it. However it didn't resolve the issues and the kontor was relocated again. The destination would first be Deventer, but the Hanse decided for Utrecht in the end. Philip the Good occupied Utrecht in 1455. Negotiations resulted in the kontor's return in August 1457 with little gain. Merchants widely ignored the embargo and it would be the last Hanseatic embargo against Flanders.

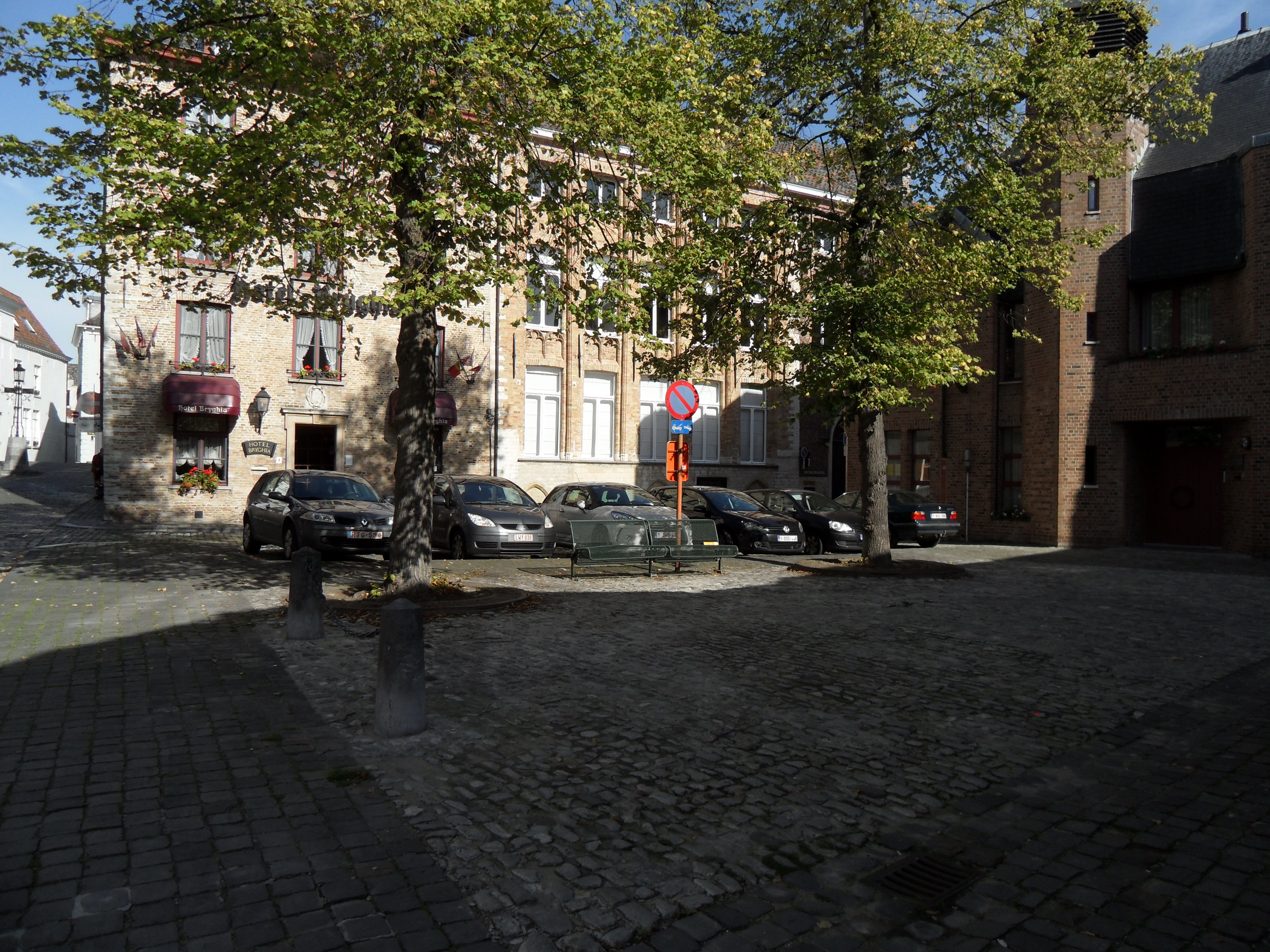
Remains of the Oosterlingenhuis. It has been split into two buildings.

=== Further decline and end ===
By the middle 15th century the closing up of the Zwin was starting to seriously harm Bruges' trade.

Trade has deteriorated so much in the 16th century from the Zwin's closure that the Hanseatic League decided to move the kontor to Antwerp in 1520. The Oostershuis, completed about 1560, was built for it.

== Organisation ==
The Kontor of Bruges was, like the other kontors, a legal person established as a merchant corporation (universitas mercatorum) in a foreign trading city to facilitate Hanseatic trade. It had its own treasury, seal, code of rules, legal power to enforce rules on residents and administration. Security was the primary reason for establishing kontors, but they were also important for inspecting trade goods and diplomacy with local and regional authorities. Compared to other kontors, the Kontor of Bruges had an unusually strong and large administrative apparatus.

=== Division and administration ===
In 1347 the Hansards were grouped into three "thirds" on their geographic origin: there was a Wendish-Saxon third, a Westphalian-Prussian third and a Gutnish-Livonian third. This mattered for administrative representation and for finances too, because the thirds had much organisation independence at Bruges.

After the reform of 1347, there were 6 aldermen in Bruges who served for one year. Each third elected 2. The duties of the alderman was to see to the observance of the statutes by the Hansards and to represent the kontor to outsiders. The number of aldermen was in 1486 reduced to 3.

There was also a board of 18 achteinen ("eighteen men"), deputies, who served for one year and had narrower tasks than the aldermen, but could also represent the kontor to outsiders. The number of achteinen was in 1486 reduced to 9.

The organisation of the Bruges kontor was expanded in the middle of the 15th century with a new secretarial position, the clerk. A clerk was trained at university in the study of law and was highly literate in Latin and in difficult legal literature. His duties were to provide the aldermen with legal advice and to manage correspondence. The clerk was an attractive and influential position that could be held for several years. The clerks contributed to the kontor's professionalisation.

Bruges' high degree of integration made it difficult for the kontor to control the Hansards' business and social interaction.

One tool that the Hanseatic League could use to pressure Bruges was temporarily moving the kontor to other places like Dordrecht, Utrecht and Antwerp. This was something that happened repeatedly during the history of the Kontor of Bruges.

=== Legislation and correspondence ===
The kontor had its own statutes that were read to the merchant community once a year and these applied in disputes between Hansards. All visiting Hanseatic traders in Bruges fell under the authority of the kontor's administration. The statutes in Bruges show the kontor's considerable independence in legal matters up to the mid 15th century, but after 1474 Hanseatic hometowns took control of the kontor's legislation, a trend that also happened in London.

The kontor communicated in Middle Low German, but it was a form that was very influenced by the Westphalian dialect (and not by the dialect of Lübeck) and coloured by Middle Dutch, even in communications with Hanseatic cities.

The kontor's archives are kept in the Historical Archive of the City of Cologne.

== Life ==
Hanseatic activity in Bruges was not centred in a geographical enclave, unlike in the other kontors. Instead the Hansards were distributed generally speaking over the entire city, even if there was a concentration in some streets or neighbourhoods, making it the most spatially integrated kontor. Lodging and other space was rented from the city's local population, and they used a local system of deposit-banking offered by hostellers and moneylenders. In the 14th century Hansards were relatively concentrated in the Carmelite and St John's quarters.

Bruges was a developed and cosmopolitan city that drew travellers from many cultures, speaking many languages. The Hansards mostly spoke the Middle Low German of their hometown, some spoke eastern Middle Dutch, while the people of Bruges spoke the Flemish Middle Dutch. The language barrier in Bruges between locals and Hansards was the smallest of any kontor. There were French, Spanish, Italian and Biscayan traders too, who usually communicated in French, the language also used by the social elite of Bruges. Bruges had up to 40000 inhabitants in the 14th century. In the 15th century a few hundred Hanseatic merchants stayed in Bruges, for a short or a long time, and they were the largest group by far, their activity likely peaking in the late 14th century. The Hansards were unusually involved in citylife. They sponsored the building of churches and, alone among foreign merchants, contributed to poor relief. Colognian merchants ran businesses that sold Rhenish wine in Weinstuben (bodegas), sometimes partnering with their hostellers.

== Trade ==
Bruges was the location of the Hanse's staple of cloth, and imported beeswax, fur and metals for the Low Countries, though the enforcement of the staple varied a lot.

The main export good from Bruges was broadcloth. Flemish cities led in the production and sale of broadcloth from the 13th to the 15th centuries and Bruges was the foremost city in the broadcloth trade. The Hanseatic League transported it all over its trading area. From 1420 Bruges faced increasing competition from London and other English towns. The trade in broadcloth was the backbone of Hanseatic trade from the 13th to the 16th century. Also other types of cloth were bought. Hansards generally bought from local merchants as intermediates, and didn't seek out local producers unlike in their other markets. Other wares were books and other luxury goods.

Hansards shipped copper from Slovakia, Hungary and Sweden to Bruges, where Flemish artisans made engraved copper plates for graves. These were in high demand all over Europe. The share of Hanseatic shipping in copper transport is not completely clear.

Hanseatic merchants also purchased spices in large amounts, Bruges was one of a few sources for them.
