= River Orwell =

River in Suffolk, England

Coordinates: 51°58′N 1°18′E

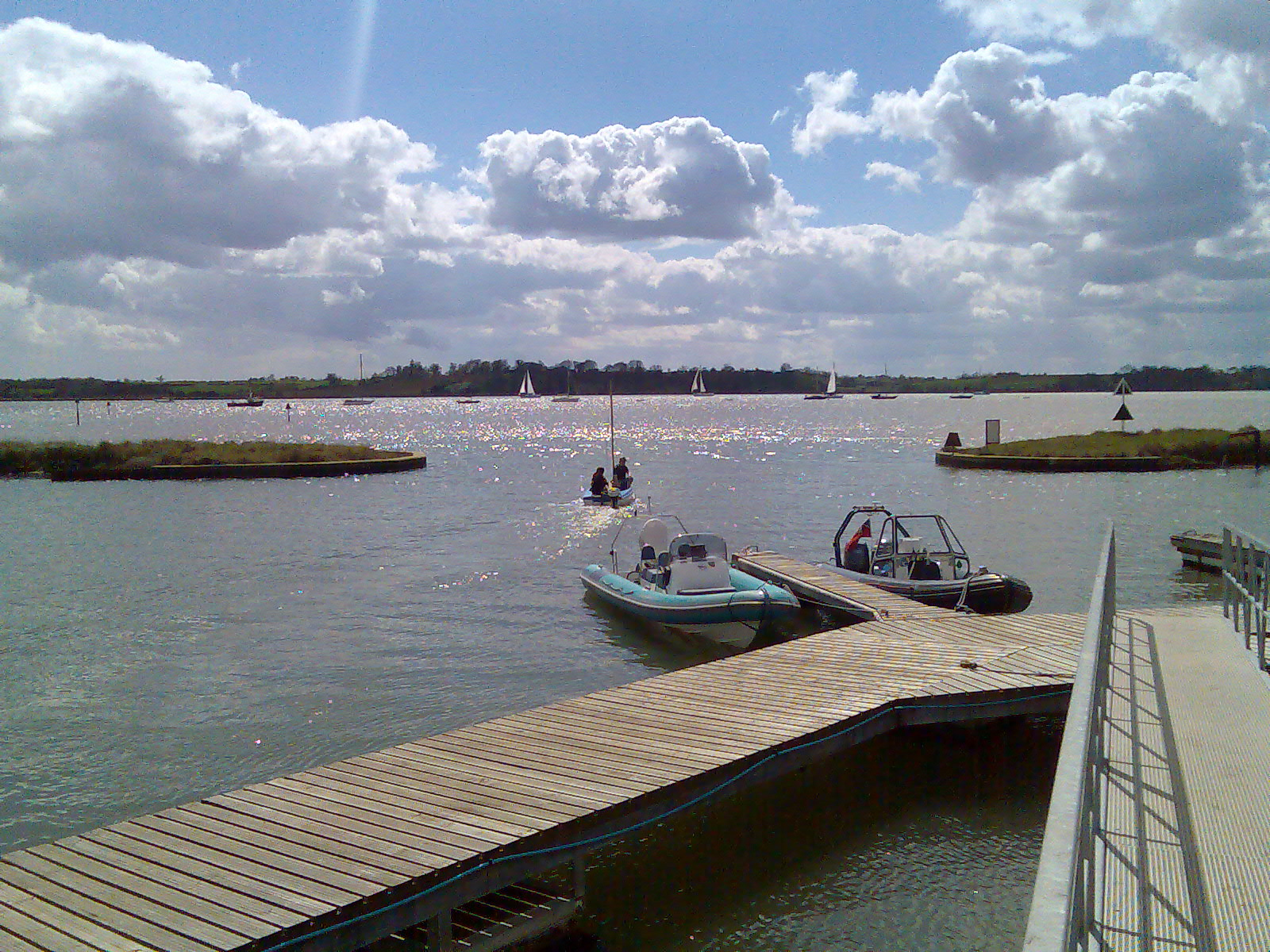

Location
- Country: England

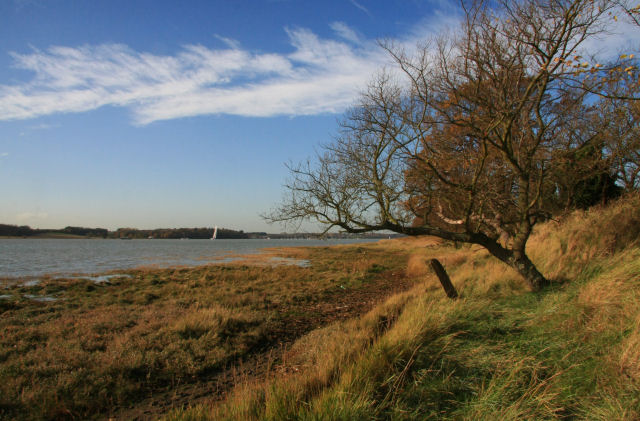
Bank of the River Orwell

The River Orwell flows through the county of Suffolk in England from Ipswich to Felixstowe. Above Ipswich, the river is known as the River Gipping, but its name changes to the Orwell at Stoke Bridge, about half a mile below where the river becomes tidal by Bobby Robson Bridge on West End Road. Technically the River Orwell is not a river, but an estuary. It broadens into an estuary at Ipswich, where the Ipswich dock has operated since the 7th century, and then flows into the North Sea at Felixstowe, the UK's largest container port, after joining the River Stour at Shotley forming Harwich harbour.

The large Orwell Bridge carries the A14 trunk road over the estuary to the south of Ipswich.

== Name ==
In the name Orwell, Or- comes from an ancient river-name—probably pre-Celtic; but -well probably indicates an Anglo-Saxon naming. In A tour through England and Wales, written in 1722, Daniel Defoe calls the river "Orwel" (though he does this inconsistently). He also mentions that "a traveller will hardly understand me, especially a seaman, when I speak of the River Stour and the River Orwell at Harwich, for they know them by no other names than those of Maningtre-Water, and Ipswich-Water". The writer Eric Blair chose the pen name under which he would later become famous, "George Orwell," because of his love for the river. A few miles north of the Orwell is another Suffolk river, the Ore, and Orfordness, the village port of Orford with its historic castle.

== Estuary ==
The estuary flows through different sections as it makes its way down from Ipswich to the sea:

=== Freston Reach ===
Redgate Hard is located here. This hard is probably post medieval.

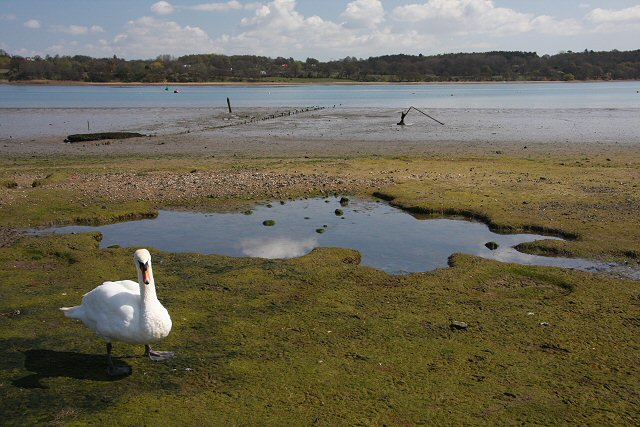
April 2008 showing remains of Redgate Hard

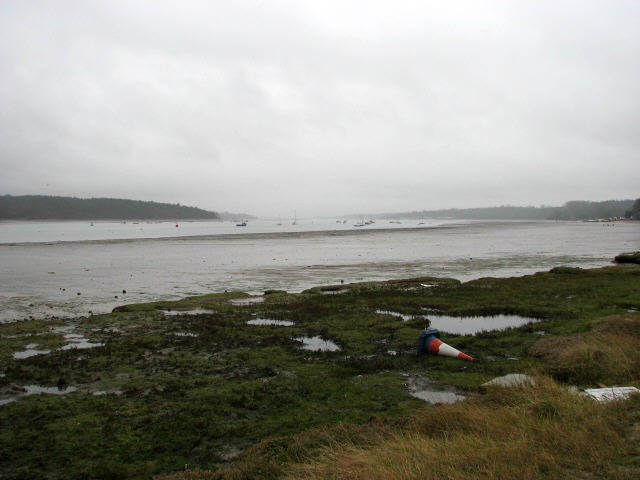
Freston Reach, January 2008

=== Downham Reach ===
A whale was beached on Downham Reach around 1816.

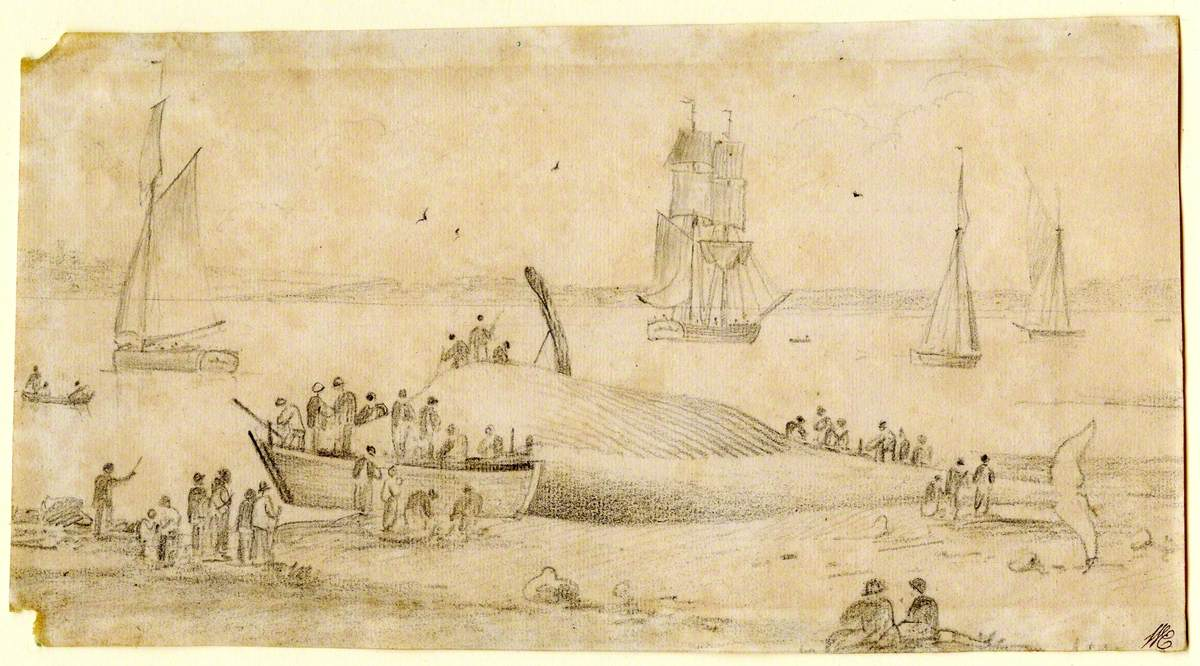
Beached whale as recorded by George Frost

=== Potters Reach ===
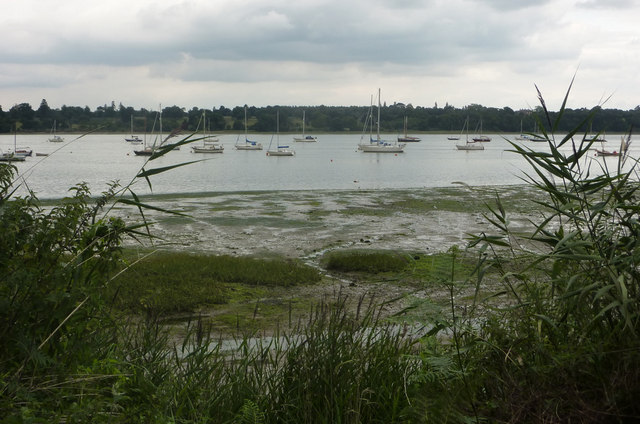
Potters Reach, August 2009

=== Lower Reach ===
At this point the Stour flows into the Orwell by Shotley Point.

== Sailing ==
The Orwell provides a popular venue for sailing. Interest originally centred on the hamlet of Pin Mill (featured in two children's novels by Arthur Ransome: We Didn't Mean To Go To Sea and Secret Water), which is home to the Pin Mill Sailing Club and its Hard. Ransome had kept his yacht Selina King at the Pin Mill anchorage in 1937–39.

Since the 1970s marinas have opened at Levington (Suffolk Yacht Harbour, pictured), Woolverstone, Fox's (just outside Ipswich), and two marinas in the old Ipswich Wet Dock. Woolverstone is home to the Royal Harwich Yacht Club that was for many years host to the Swordfish 15-foot racing dinghy built by Fairey Marine, in addition to its 12-foot Firefly, a derivative of the National 12-foot dinghy, both designed by the sailor Uffa Fox. It now hosts a broad range of sailing events, such as the annual 'Junior Race Week'.

== Ipswich Barrier ==
Ipswich has in the past been affected by flooding, both fluvial flooding from water passing down the river Gipping, and tidal flooding from tidal surges passing up the estuary of the Orwell, with the river becoming much narrower near to the entrance to Ipswich Docks. In order to reduce this risk, the Environment Agency implemented a programme of works expected to cost a total of £58 million to improve the flood defences on both banks of the tidal river and of the Port of Ipswich. The work included the construction of the Ipswich tidal barrier, and because the work affected the right of navigation on the New Cut, the section of the Orwell immediately above the barrier site, it required an order to be issued under the Transport and Works Act 1992. The Ipswich Barrier Order was issued by the Secretary of State for the Environment, Food and Rural Affairs in August 2012.

The barrier consists of a rising sector gate, 66 feet (20 m) wide and 30 feet (9 m) high, located just to the west of the entrance to the wet dock. In November 2014, a contract for £28 million was awarded to VBA, a joint venture between VolkerStevin, Boskalis Westminster and Atkins, for construction of the barrier and associated flood defences on the banks of the river. The barrier is designed to prevent tidal surges passing further up stream, and to enable downstream fluvial flows to be controlled. It provides better flood protection to some 1,500 homes and 400 business properties. The river at the barrier site was 180 feet (55 m) wide, but in order to allow the construction of the barrier and the commissioning of the gate, a large cofferdam, 98 feet (30 m) square, extending 20.6 metres (68 ft) downwards into the chalk bed of the river, was formed against the east bank. This left a much narrower channel to allow the river flows to reach the estuary and boats to continue to access the river above the barrier site.

The sector gate was designed by the German firm IRS, and was manufactured in Holland by Hollandia. Once assembled, it was floated across the North Sea, and lifted into the concrete support structure by a 600 tonne crane. The position of the gate is moved by two hydraulic cylinders, and it can be positioned to prevent a tidal surge passing up stream, or to regulate the downstream flow of the river. The concrete structure was tied in to the eastern bank early in the project, but ties to the western bank had to wait until the gate had been commissioned. At that point, both the flow of the river and boats could pass through the new structure, and the side channel could be blocked off. The new barrier was officially opened in early February 2019 by Therese Coffey, Floods Minister at the Department for Environment, Food and Rural Affairs, by which time the cost of the project had risen to £67.4 million. While most of the funding came from the Environment Agency, some was also provided by Ipswich Borough Council, the New Anglia Local Enterprise Partnership, the Regional Flood and Coastal Committee, and UK Power Networks.

== The Yangtse Incident ==
The 1957 film Yangtse Incident: The Story of HMS Amethyst was filmed on the river. The naval shore establishment at HMS Ganges also featured in the film being used as a site for Chinese gun batteries.

== Bibliography ==
- VBA (1 October 2017). "Ipswich Tidal Barrier Project (2017)". Water Projects online. Archived from the original on 10 May 2021.
