= Kontor =

Foreign trading post of the Hanseatic League

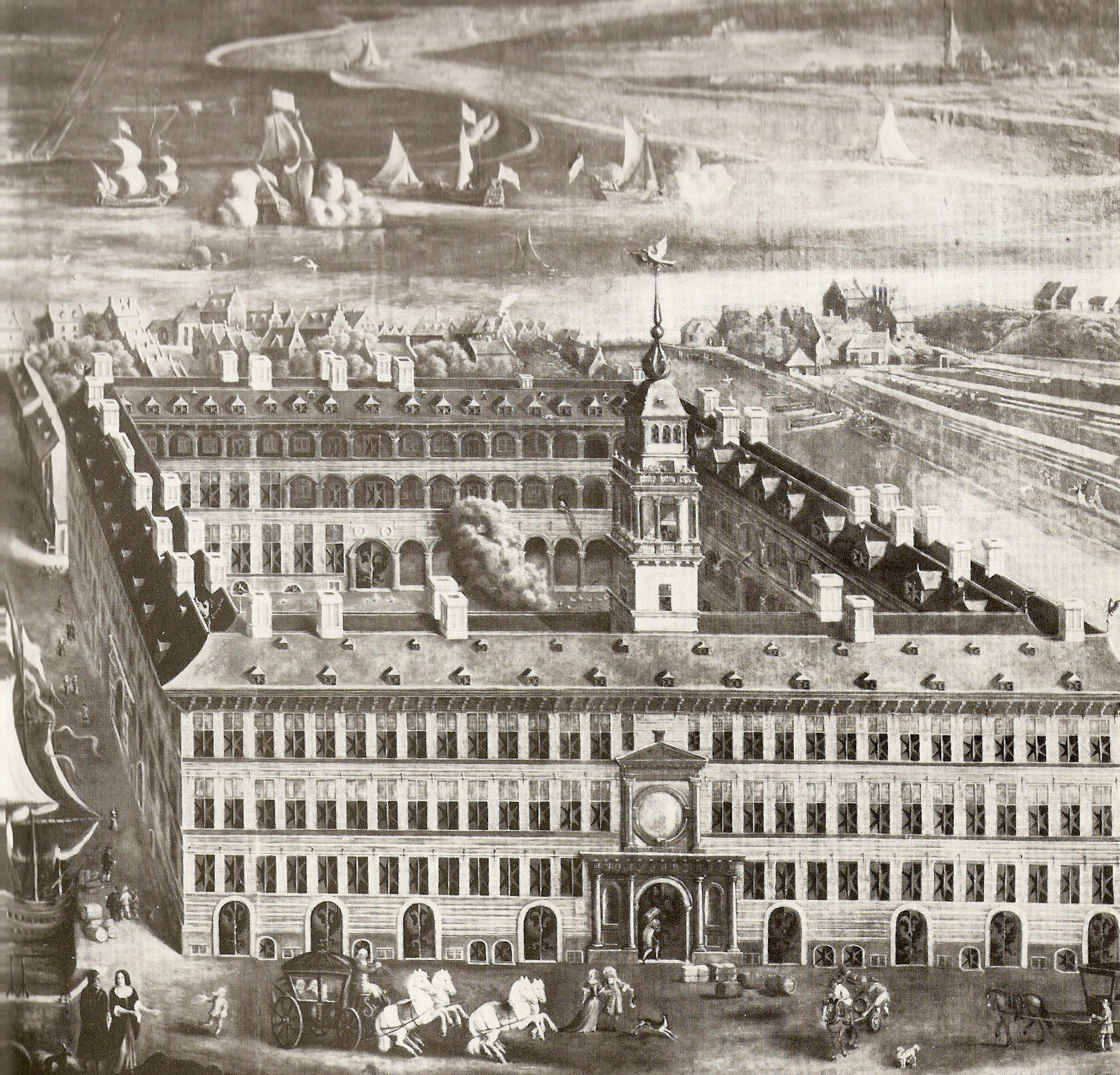
The Oostershuis, Hanseatic kontor in Antwerp

A kontor (also Kontor; English: /kɒnˈtɔːr/, German: [kɔnˈtoːɐ̯]) was a major foreign trading post of the Hanseatic League. Kontors were legal entities established in a foreign city (i.e. a city that did not belong to the Hanseatic League), with a degree of legal autonomy. Most kontors were also enclaves. They were located in London (the Steelyard), Bruges (Kontor of Bruges, later moved to Antwerp), Bergen (Bryggen), and Novgorod (Peterhof). Smaller Hanseatic trading posts were called factorien, i.e., factories.

The kontors were established as corporations or guilds of senior merchants from trade guilds. The main reason to found them was security. The Peterhof in Novgorod was founded first, in the early 13th century, the kontor of Bruges and Bryggen in Bergen were founded last. They were subordinated to the decisions of the Hansetag (Hanseatic diet) in the mid 14th century.

In addition to the kontore were less important trading posts. The vitten at the Scanian herring fairs were not as important as the kontors but more significant than the average outpost. The typical Hanseatic outpost, also called factory, had a representative merchant and a warehouse; many did not operate all year. These are not considered kontors in the literature but popular discussions are often confused.

== Etymology ==
Kontor is Middle Low German. It comes from French comptoir, from Latin computāre "calculate, compute".

== Organisation and social structure ==
The kontors were legal entities established as a merchant's corporation (universitas mercatorum) and served to facilitate the Hanseatic League's trade. They had their own treasury, seal, code of rules, legal power to enforce rules on residents and administration. They were usually also merchant enclaves; the Kontor of Bruges was an exception.

Security was the primary reason for the formation of kontors, but kontors also played an important role in inspecting trade goods and diplomacy with local and regional authorities.

=== Administration ===
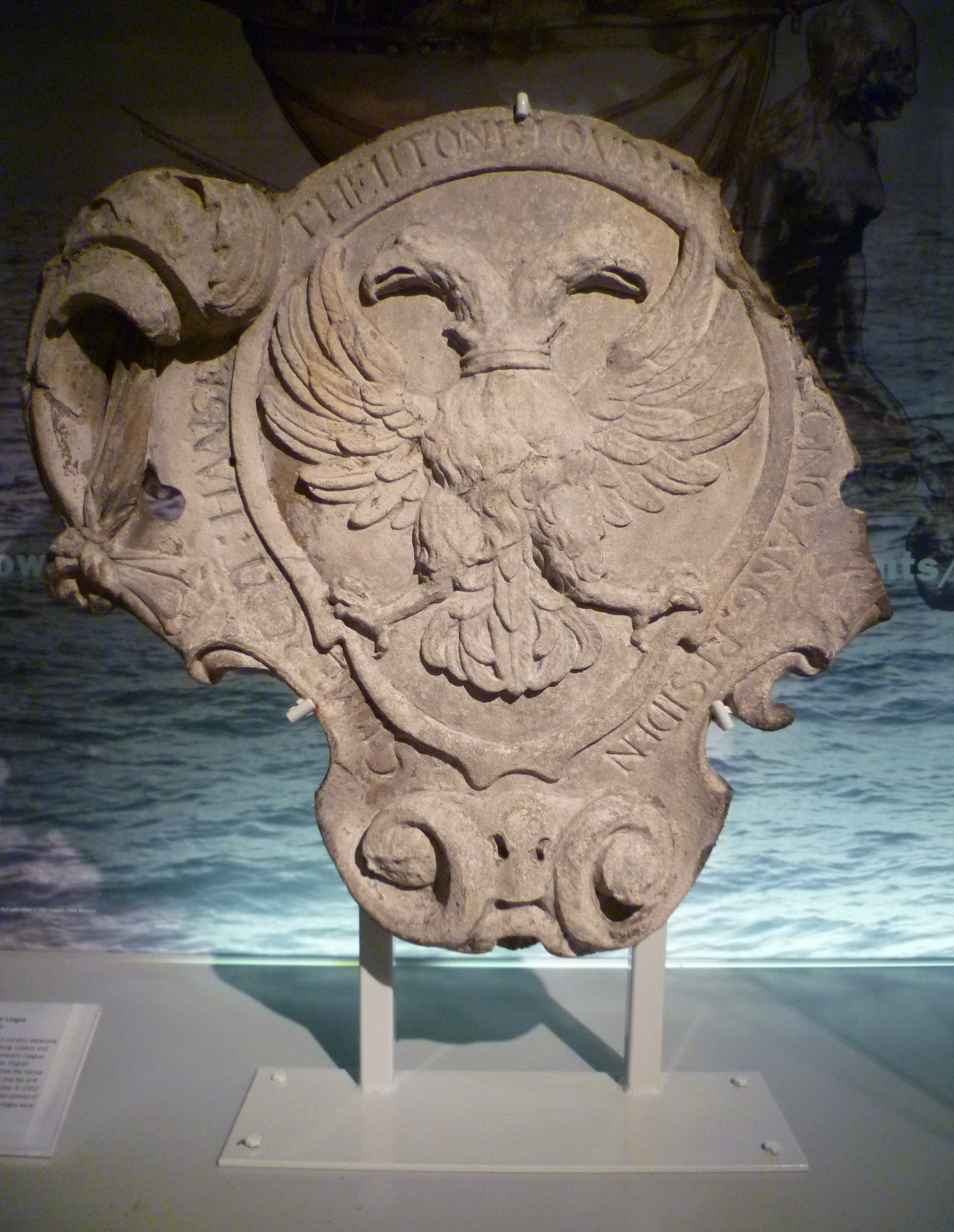
The arms of the Stalhof (Steelyard) (c. 1670)

Each kontor had its own unique kind of administration, although there were clear similarities between the kontors. Aldermen (oldermenn, hovetlude or procuratores) formed the internal legal authority and a representative to the rest of the Hanseatic League and to local authorities. The numbers of aldermen varied. The kontor of Bruges had first six and later three aldermen, and the Steelyard had one Hanseatic alderman and one English alderman. It is assumed that Bryggen had 6 aldermen at first. One view about Bryggen is that it changed to 2 in the first half of the 15th century, and that after a change in 1476 two aldermen held the post alternately. Another view is that Bryggen had one alderman from the 15th century. The Peterhof had one. Alderman usually held their position for a term of a year.

All resident and visiting Hanseatic traders fell under the authority of the kontor's administration.

At the Peterhof in Novgorod the office of alderman was replaced by the hofknecht in the 15th century, after the Livonian towns gained authority over the Peterhof. The hofknecht was an appointee of the Livonian towns who was a permanent resident and could speak Russian.

Aldermen were supported by the achteinen or Achtzehnmänner, officials that fulfilled special functions and had the authority to represent the kontor when needed. They usually numbered eighteen, but in Bruges their number was later lowered to nine.

The kontors of Bruges, London and Bergen got a new secretarial position in the middle of the 15th century, the clerk. A clerk had gone to university to study law and was highly literate in Latin and in difficult legal literature. His duties were to provide the aldermen with legal advice and to manage correspondence. The clerk was an attractive and influential position that could be held for several years. The clerks increased the kontor's professionalisation.

In Novgorod a priest performed secretarial duties. He was appointed alternately by one of two Hanseatic cities.

The kontors in London and Bruges were reformed into Drittel (thirds) in the 14th century, where the trader community was divided into three thirds based on geographic origin for administrative representation and finances. The thirds were organised differently in London and Bruges.

In the mid 14th century the League subordinated all trading posts including the Kontors to the Diet's decisions, and the kontors' envoys also received the right to attend and speak at Diets but they lacked voting power.

=== Law ===
Kontors each had their own code of regulations. The statutes were written in Middle Low German and recited to the trader community once a year. They regulated matters like the authority of the kontor leadership, trade, taxes, duties, rights and contact with natives and outsiders.

== Legacy ==
Most kontor buildings have not survived, only Bergen's kontor, known as Bryggen in Norway, and the Oosterlingenhuis in Bruges have survived until the present day. The Hanseatic kontor at Bryggen was closed in 1754 and replaced by a "Norwegian kontor", run by Norwegian citizens, but still with a large element of German immigrants. Bergen's kontor is on the UNESCO list of the World Cultural Heritage sites.

The Hanseatic Warehouse in King's Lynn in Norfolk, England, which was actually a factory, not a kontor, managed to survive, but was converted into offices in 1971.

The word "kontor" spread via the Hanseatic League. The word kontor continues to mean "office" in the Scandinavian languages and in Estonian.

Probably from Dutch, and quite possibly thanks to Peter the Great, the word, as конто́ра (kontora), is also one term for "office", "department", "organization", "bureau", etc. in Russian and Ukrainian.

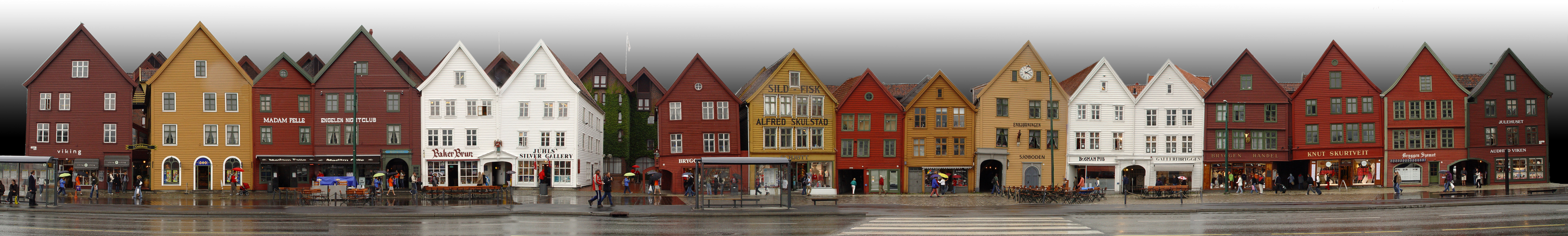
Panoramic view of Bryggen in Norway
