= George Frost (landscape painter) =

English artist based in Suffolk

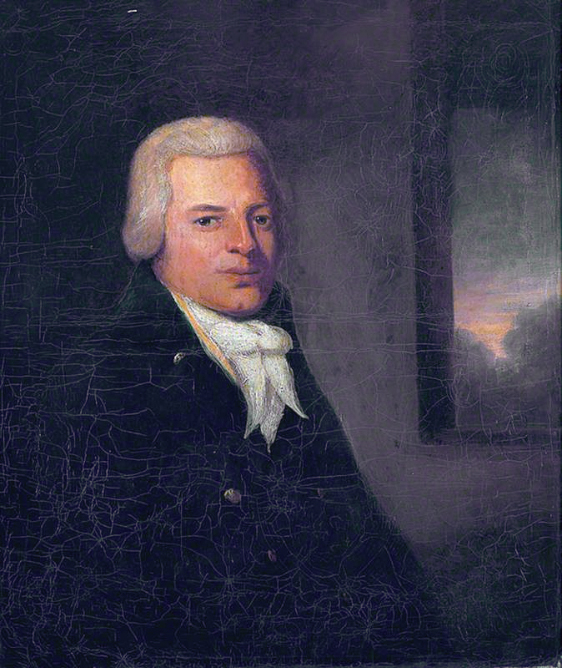
- Self portrait (c. 1800)
- Born: 1754
- Died: 28 June 1821 (aged 66–67)
- Known for: Landscape paintings

George Frost (1754–1821) was an English landscape painter who lived in Ipswich, Suffolk, England.

== Biography ==
Frost was the son of a builder at Ousden in Suffolk, and was originally brought up to his father's business. He subsequently obtained a post in the office of the Blue Coach at Ipswich where he worked until about eight years before his death.

== Career as an artist ==
Frost had a natural and early love of drawing, and was self-taught as an artist. According to his obituary in the Gentleman's Magazine:

His productions, and more particularly his Drawings, were admirable, and exhibited abundant proofs of the character and genius of a Master. He studied nature with the closest attention, and in his attempts to delineate her beauties, was eminently successful. He was an accurate observer of her in all her appearances, and possessed a characteristic touch for all her forms. The subjects which he selected were such as did credit to his taste and judgment; and whatever came from his pencil bore the impress of originality and truth, and evinced, in a bold and masterly manner, the local character and features of the County In which he resided.

He was a great admirer and imitator of Gainsborough, and possessed some paintings and drawings by him, notably "The Mall", of which he executed a careful copy when in his 77th year. He was also a close friend of John Constable. His employment at Ipswich caused him to limit his subjects to that town and its neighbourhood, and he was little known elsewhere.

== Gallery ==
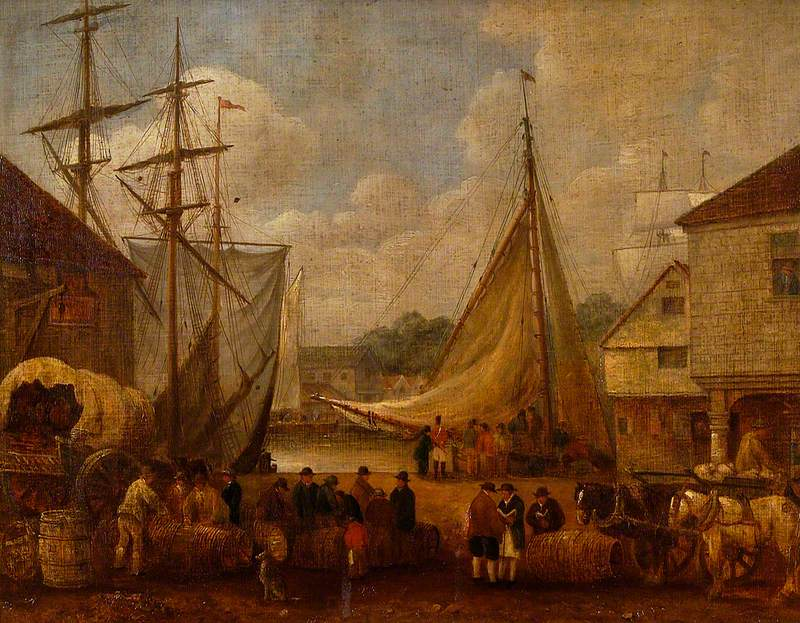
The Common Quay, Ipswich 1820

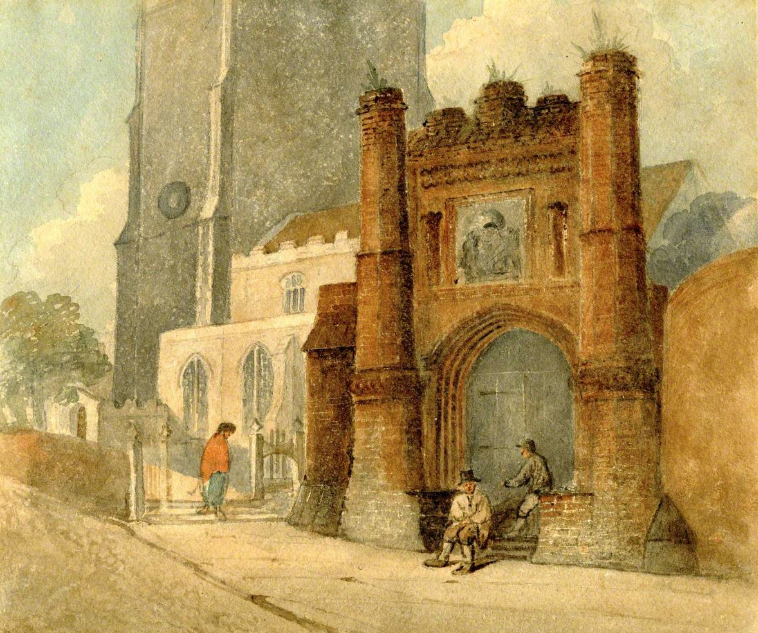
Wolsey's Gate, Ipswich,

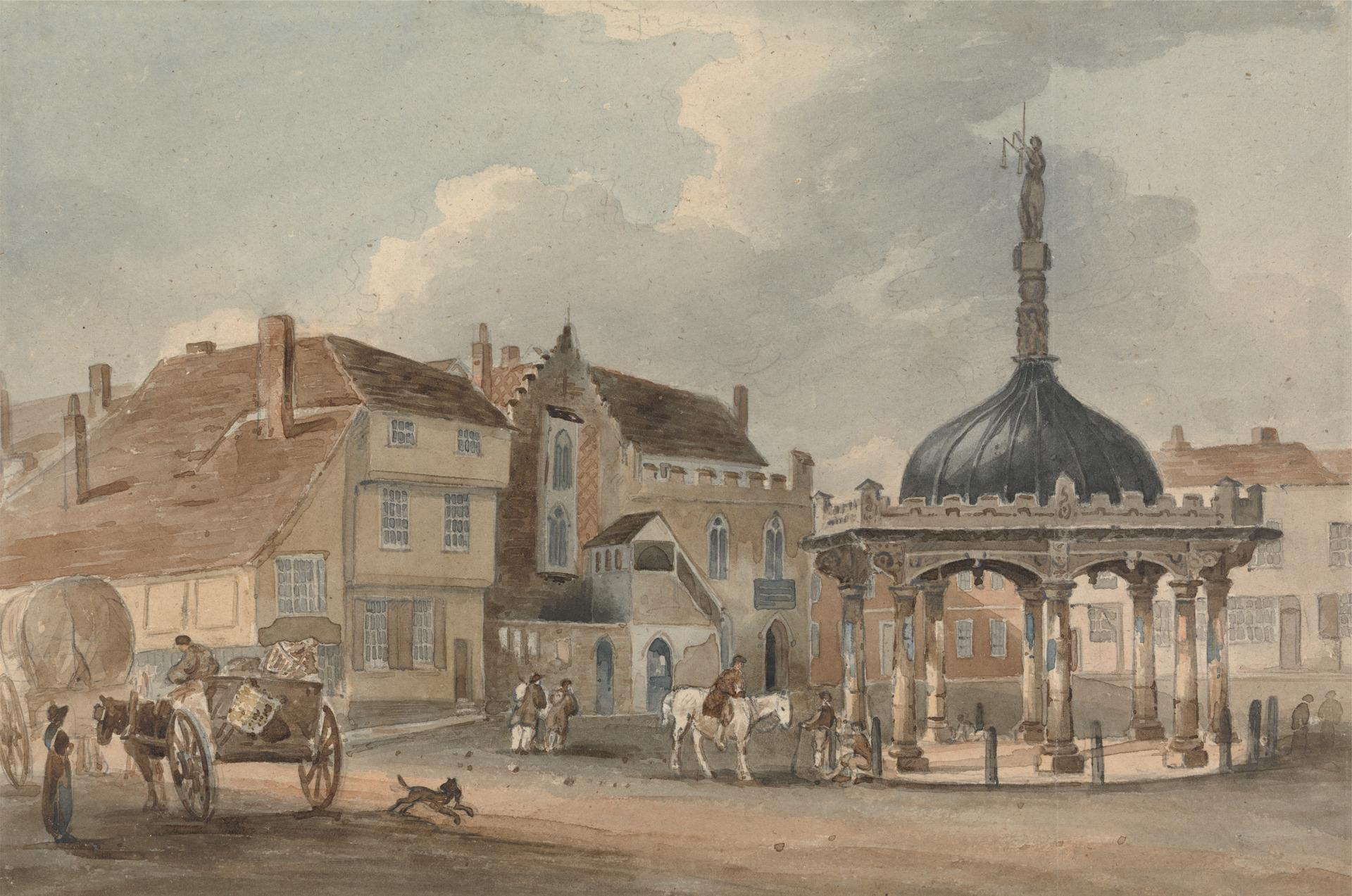
Corn Hill and Moot Hall, Ipswich

== Death ==
Frost died at his home on the Common Quay at Ipswich on 28 June 1821 after a painful illness.

== Sources ==
This article incorporates text from a publication now in the public domain: "Frost, George". Dictionary of National Biography. London: Smith, Elder & Co. 1885–1900.
