= Oostershuis =

Belgian kontor

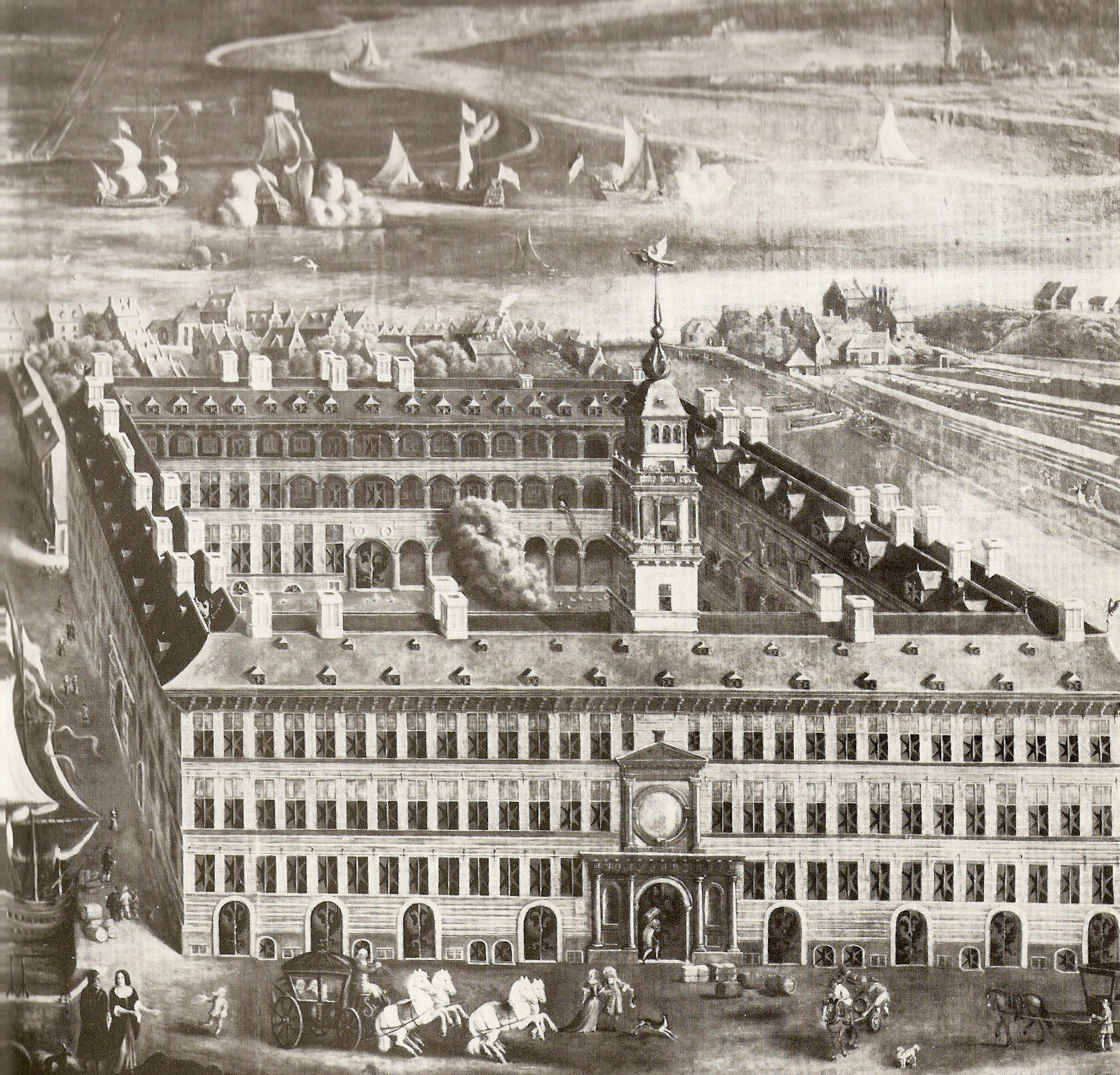
The Oostershuis in Antwerp (c. 1700)

The Oostershuis (Dutch for Eastern House) was a kontor in Antwerp as the continuation of the kontor in Bruges. Bruges' role in trade declined in the second half of the 15th century, and there were plans to formally move the kontor to Antwerp in the 16th century.

Designed by Cornelis Floris II, it was erected about 1560, closed in 1593 and destroyed by fire in 1893.
