= Port of Ipswich =

Major port in Suffolk, England

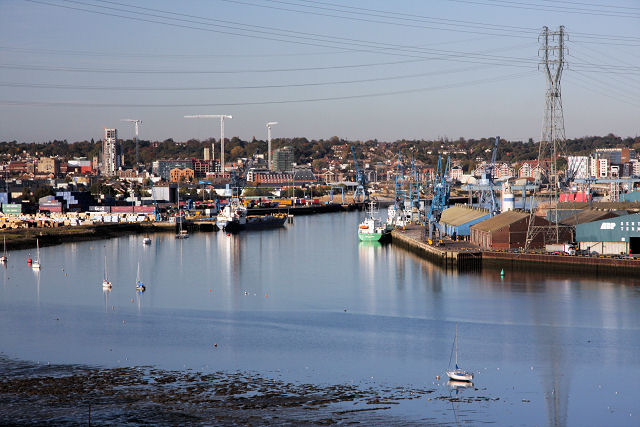
The Port of Ipswich from the Orwell Bridge. The tidal quays at the port of Ipswich include Cliff Quay to the right and the West Bank Terminal to the left.

The Port of Ipswich can be dated to c.625. The name Ipswich was originally Gippeswyc, referring to the River Gyppes with a suffix derived from the Scandinavian term vik, which had evolved from meaning bay or inlet to mean landing-place, following the proliferation of merchants requiring places to unload their goods and conduct trade. Since 1997 the port has been run by Associated British Ports.

== History ==
=== Early Middle Ages, 7th century to 1066 ===
The Port of Ipswich emerged in the Early Middle Ages. A wharf was in operation in Ipswich on a bend in the River Orwell in the 8th century, and was probably established during the 7th century under the protection of the Wuffingas, the ruling house of the Kingdom of East Anglia. Steven Plunkett has suggested that the founding of Gipeswic was associated with the reign of Rædwald (died c.624) and that it reflected his personal importance during the period of his supremacy.

The importance of this wharf, and the town which grew up around it, has been recognised through excavation over the past fifty years. The early town of Ipswich (then called Gipeswic), centred upon the quay, extended over more than 52 hectares, the area later enclosed by the Viking Age ramparts (which curtailed the Anglo-Saxon township), making it one of the largest new early post-Roman townships and emporia in northern Europe. Imported pottery of Rhenish Merovingian types, imported lava quern-stones and barrel-timbers dendro-dated to 8th century Germany, and finds of continental coinage such as 'porcupine sceattas' indicate trade through the Rhine port towns including Domburg, Dorestad and Andernach, as part of the cultural engagement of Anglo-Saxon England with the Frisian, Frankish, Alamannic, Saxon, Thuringian and Burgundian worlds. The important 'Ipswich ware' pottery industry, established in the town's north-east quarter probably in the late 7th century, reflected shapes and kiln technologies based on Frisian prototypes, either in imitation of imports arriving at the quay or set up by migrant Frisian workers. The Gipeswic dock was therefore the trade capital of the East Anglian Kingdom, situated not far from its royal centre at Rendlesham and Sutton Hoo. During the 7th and 8th centuries the two greatest English ports were York (Eoforwic) and London, and two principal new ports were Gipeswic in the east and Hamwic (Southampton) in the south. Like Hamwih, Gipeswic dock was therefore a point of departure and arrival for continental travel.

The early waterfront of Ipswich ran from approximately St Peter's Church, near the present Stoke Bridge, eastward behind the present quay or marina embankment and past the present Custom House. It lay originally nearer to the line of College Street and Salthouse Street, with new revetments being built successively further out into the river in order to achieve a sufficient depth of water for ships to moor, as the earlier embankments became silted. The area between the road and the quay, formerly occupied by warehouses, represents this area of successive embankments built upon river-mud. An extensive area of early Medieval waterfront construction was found by excavation during early twenty-first century works to demolish the old industrial waterfront, and showed the footings of many projecting boardwalks, in a similar way to the contemporary waterfront at Dorestad, one of its principal trading partners in those times.

The original crossing was a ford, east of Stoke Bridge, linking Great Whip Street (on the south bank) with Foundation Street to the north, which then immediately branched into Lower Brook Street. The area north of the road, between St Peter's church and St Mary-at-Quay (and east of that), is thought to represent the site of the Anglo-Saxon industrial waterfront development. Its first urban catchment area extended north up to Falcon Street, Old Cattle Market, Dog's Head Street and Tacket Street, with burial grounds on rising land to the north. Probably during the 8th century the Stoke Bridge crossing was created, establishing the importance of St Peter's Street as the main northern route, and urban expansion spread over the burial grounds north to include the street called Buttermarket, the Cornhill area, and the line of the prehistoric road now represented by Westgate Street, Tavern Street and Carr Street. Discoveries of early sceattas in this area, and a dedication to St Mildred, suggest that this new layout was planned during the reigns of Kings Ealdwulf (664-713) and his son Ælfwald (713-749). The street plan represented by this early Medieval development still largely survives in use in the modern town of Ipswich, and is one of the oldest post-Roman street-plans to survive anywhere in Europe. Both wharf and town have remained in continuous use and occupation since that time.

In 991 a fleet of 93 Viking ships swept up the river Orwell and sacked the port.

=== High Middle Ages, 1066 to 1306 ===
The Norman Conquest of England brought Roger Bigod to Ipswich. Amongst his holdings in East Anglia, he established Bigod's Quay in Ipswich. The stone buildings of this establishment stood out amongst the largely wooden buildings of its neighbours. These included a house and was located in the area of Key Street, which was close to the bank of the Orwell, the river being broader at that time. The trade was to a great extent based around wool, cloth, hides and skins.

During this period the records refer to the Port of Orwell, which was located on a tongue of land near modern day Landguard Fort stretching towards Harwich.

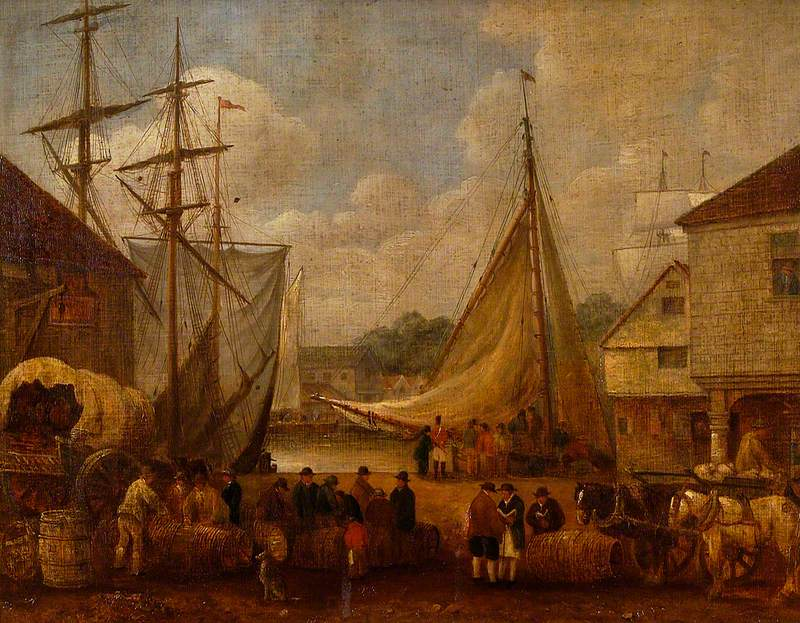
Common Quay in 1820 by George Frost

=== Late Middle Ages, 1306 to 1485 ===
During the Late Middle Ages Ipswich developed as a port and developed a flourishing trade with cities of the Hanseatic League.

=== 1797 Report ===
During the seventeenth century the management and control of the port and River Orwell was the responsibility of Ipswich Corporation. However many local merchants and other inhabitants felt that the corporation had been neglecting their duties. Funds generated by the port facilities were being misappropriated and trade was being affected. In consequence a committee was formed to take active measures to correct the abuses and manage the resources. They decided to commission William Chapman to write a report, which was duly submitted in May 1797. This report included two costed possible plans for development.

In 1803 the Committee organised a public meeting at which they pushed for the implementation of Plan 2, as far as funds would permit. Despite opposition from Ipswich Corporation the Committee was given responsibility for the port and river.

=== The coming of the Wet Dock, 1837 ===
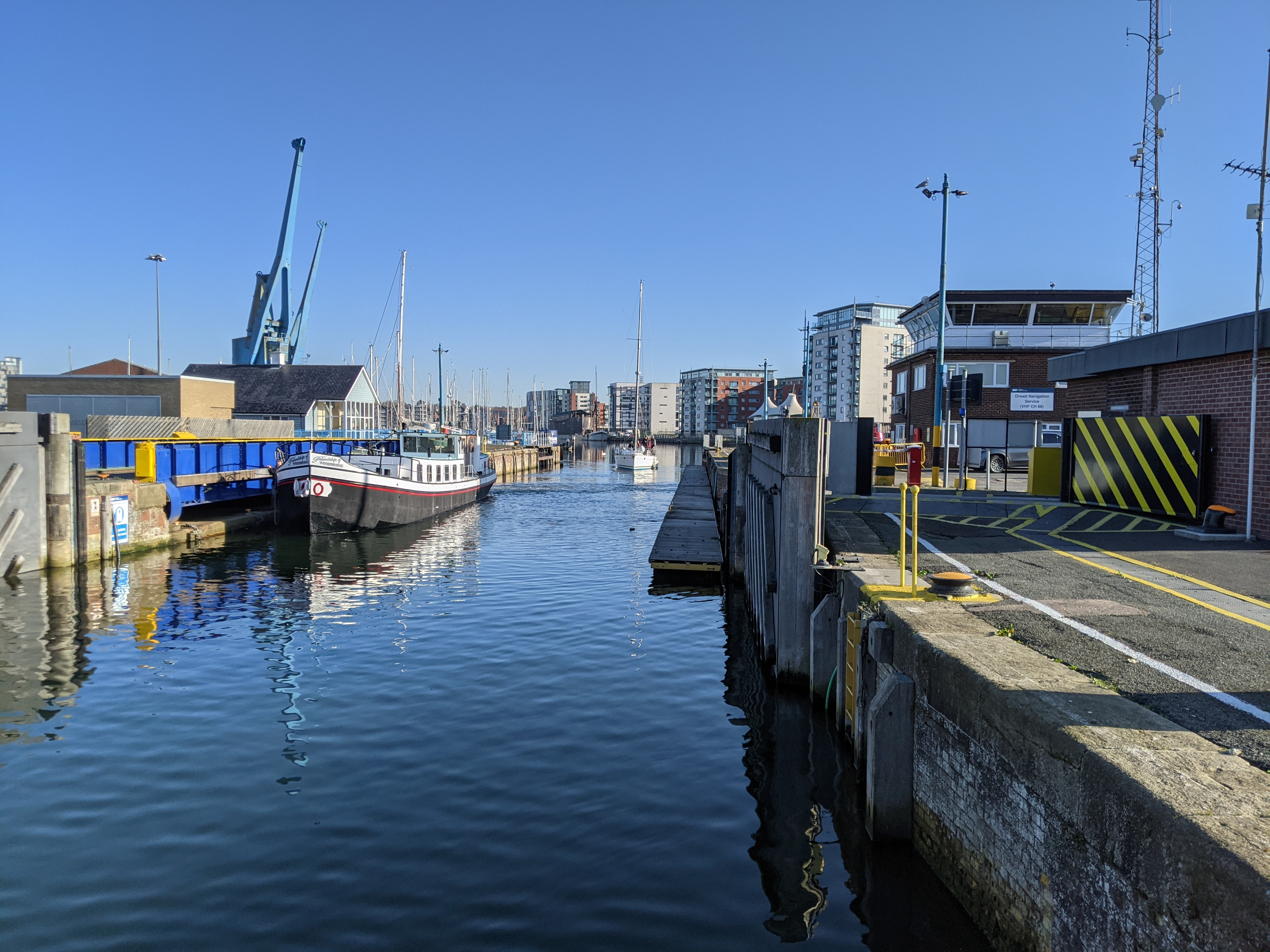
View of Ipswich Lock and entrance to Wet Dock. Orwell Navigation Service building pictured (R) on east side of lock.

With the creation of the Wet Dock in 1837, the management of the port was significantly altered. No longer was Common Quay the only place goods could legally be unloaded.

== Since 1997: Associated British Ports ==
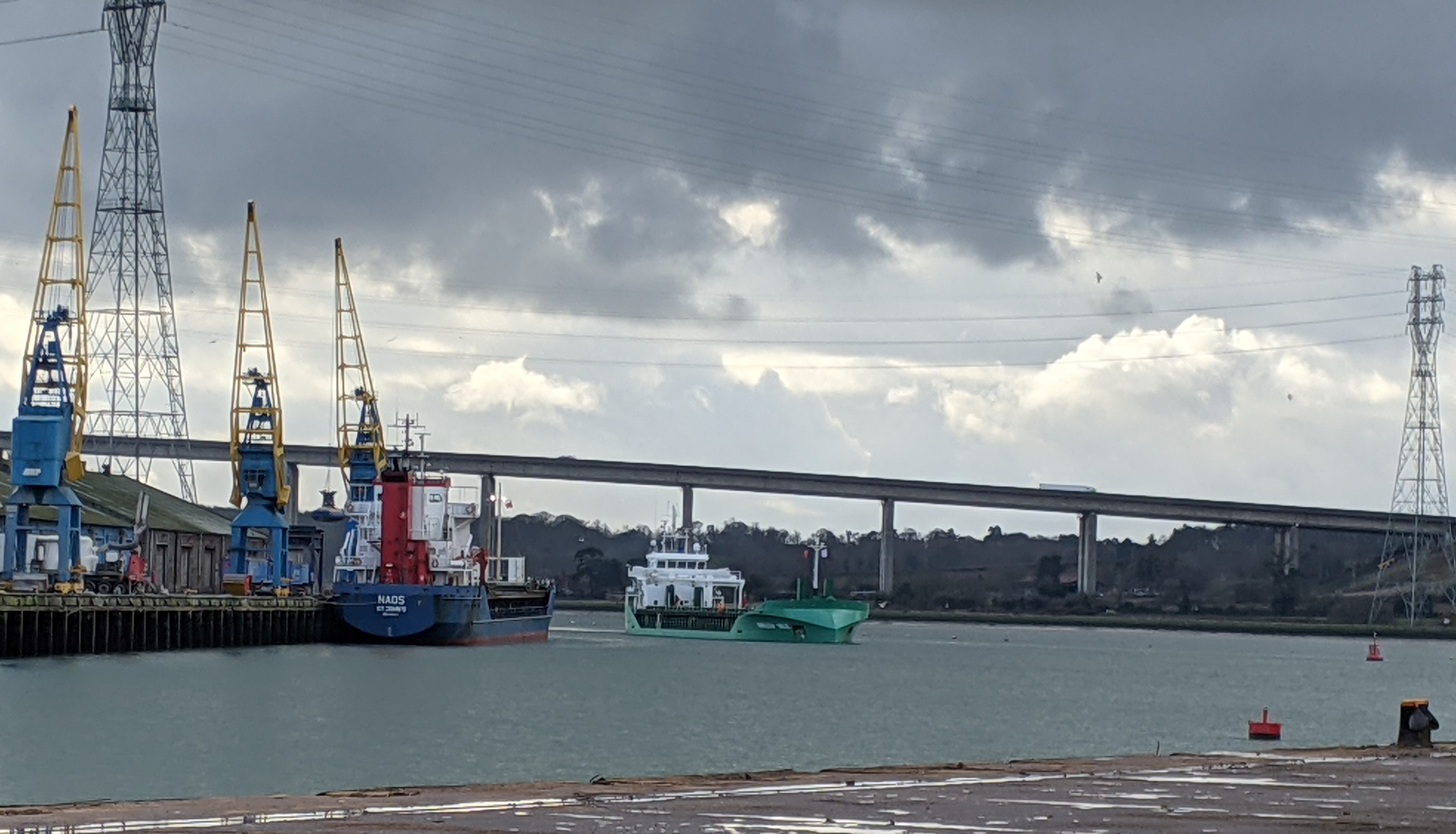
Cargo ship 'Arklow Vale' entering the Port of Ipswich under Orwell Bridge.

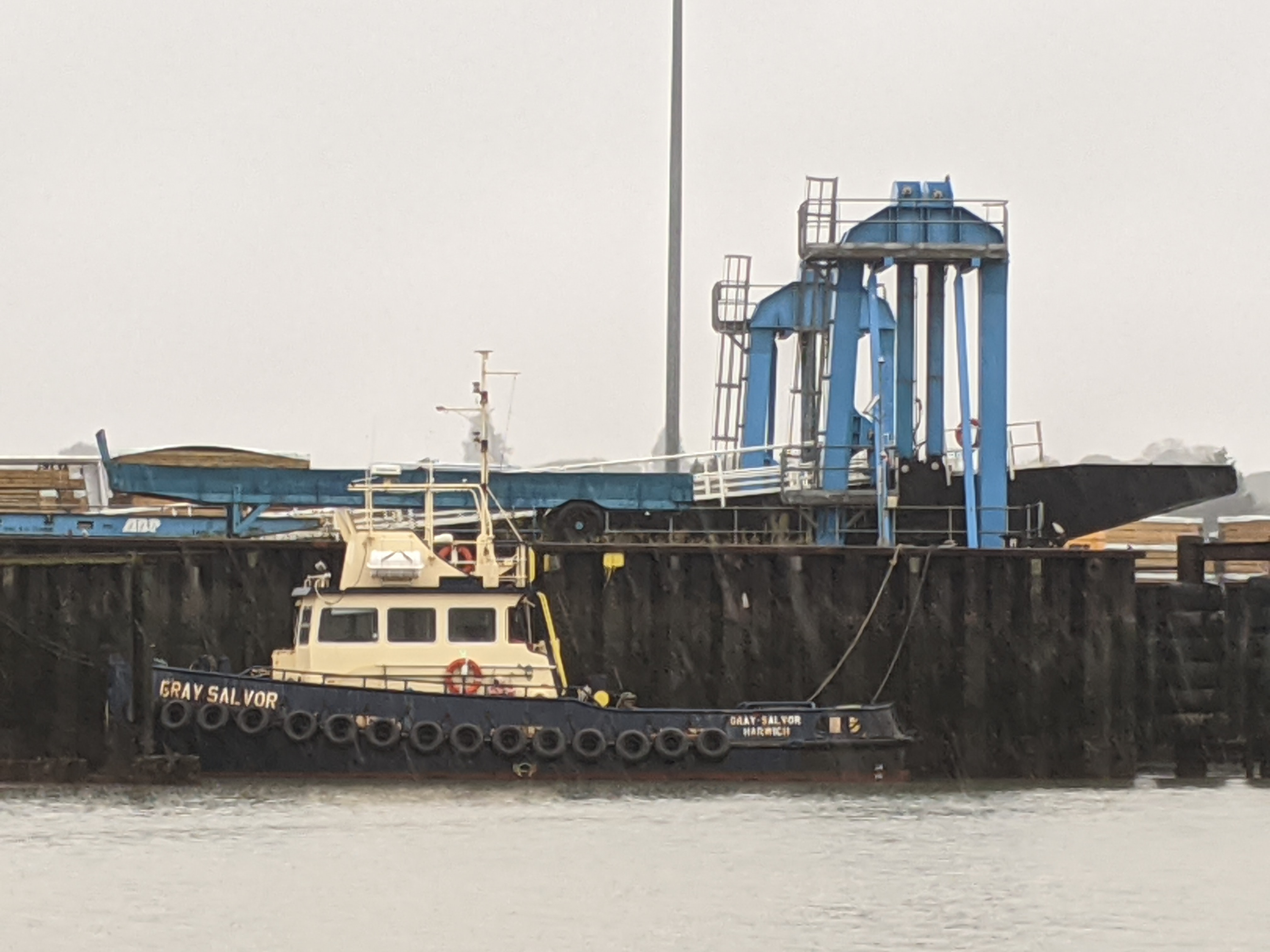
Tug 'Gray Salvor' berthed on West Bank, Port of Ipswich

In 1997 the port was sold by Ipswich Ports Ltd to Associated British Ports. They operate both the 'West Bank' terminal (to the south of the New Cut, on the west bank of the Orwell) and 'Cliff Quay' (on the east bank of the Orwell). The West Bank has two transit sheds totalling 6,377 sq m, plus areas available for open storage and 4 berths; West Bank North, Ro-Ro 1, Ro-Ro 2, and West Bank South. There is also a small tug berth located on the West Bank.

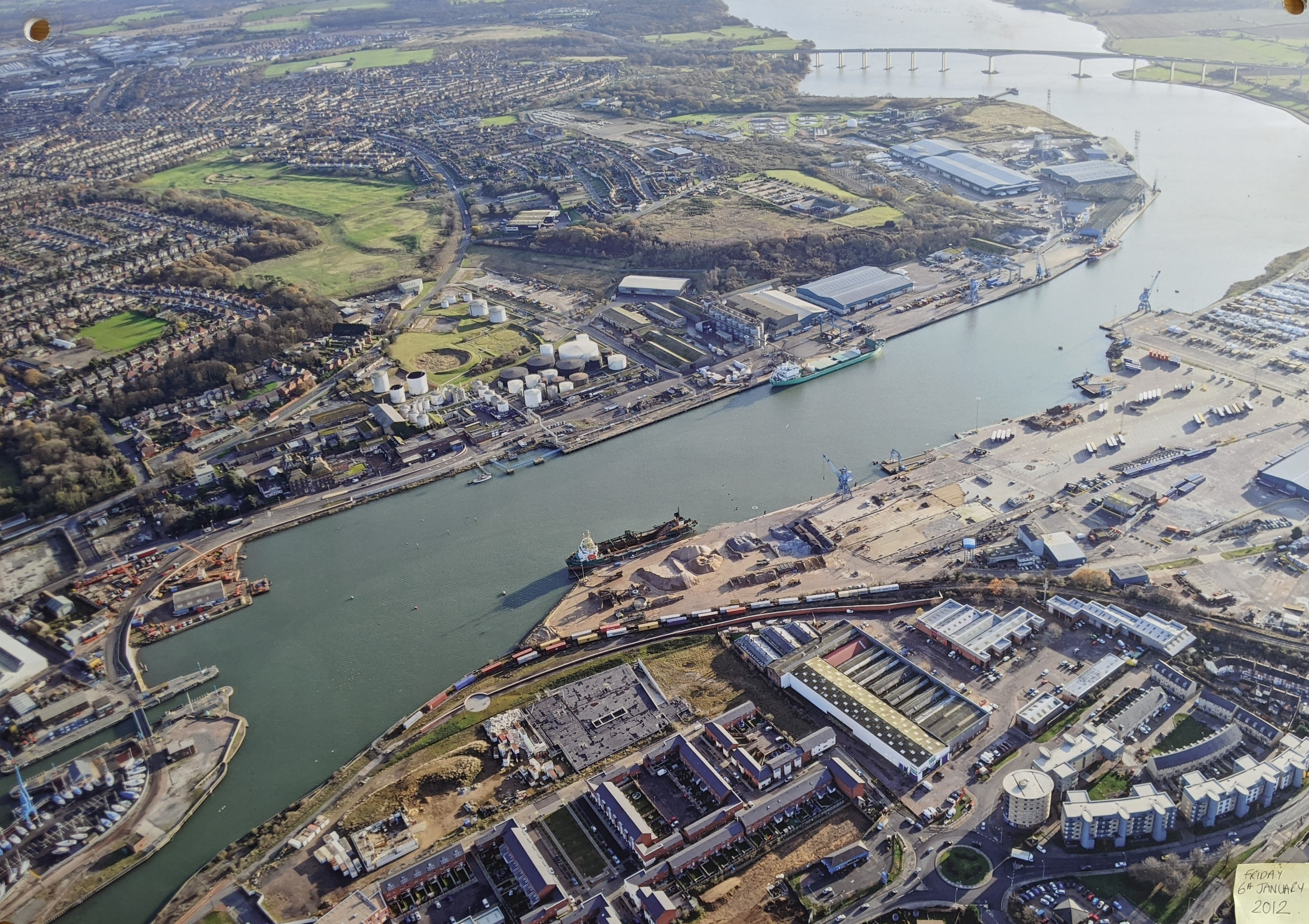
Port of Ipswich, aerial view, 2012.

Cliff Quay handles and stores liquid and dry bulks and has 67,583 sq m of covered storage and additional open storage. Cliff Quay has 9 berths; Bulk Liquid Terminal, Ipswich Grain Terminal, East Bank Terminal North, East Bank Terminal, 500' North, 500' South, 1 Shed, 2 Shed and Power Station. There is a daily freight service linking Ipswich with the Port of Rotterdam. While the port no longer handles containers, it can accept out-of-gauge and heavy lift cargoes and is equipped to accommodate short to mid-sea operations. The cargo products and services provided at the port are agribulks, bulk energy, liquid bulks, project cargo, construction, forest products, and rail freight.

The port can handle vessels up to approximately 155m in length and a maximum draught of 8.5m. The main River Orwell navigation channel is dredged to a charted depth of 5.6m below Admiralty Chart datum. There is an available air draught of 43.07m above Admiralty Chart datum (under the Orwell Bridge). Orwell Navigation Service (callsign 'Ipswich Port Radio') provide local port services, operate Ipswich Lock and maintain a continuous 24 hour watch on marine VHF channel 68.

Welfare and practical services for seafarers arriving at the port are available via the services of a port chaplain.

Associated British Ports also operates the Ipswich Haven Marina (located in Ipswich Dock) with mooring for 250 private boats. Also located on the island site (west side of dock) are two boatbuilders (Fairline Yachts and Spirit Yachts).
