= Anselm Adornes =

Belgian merchant

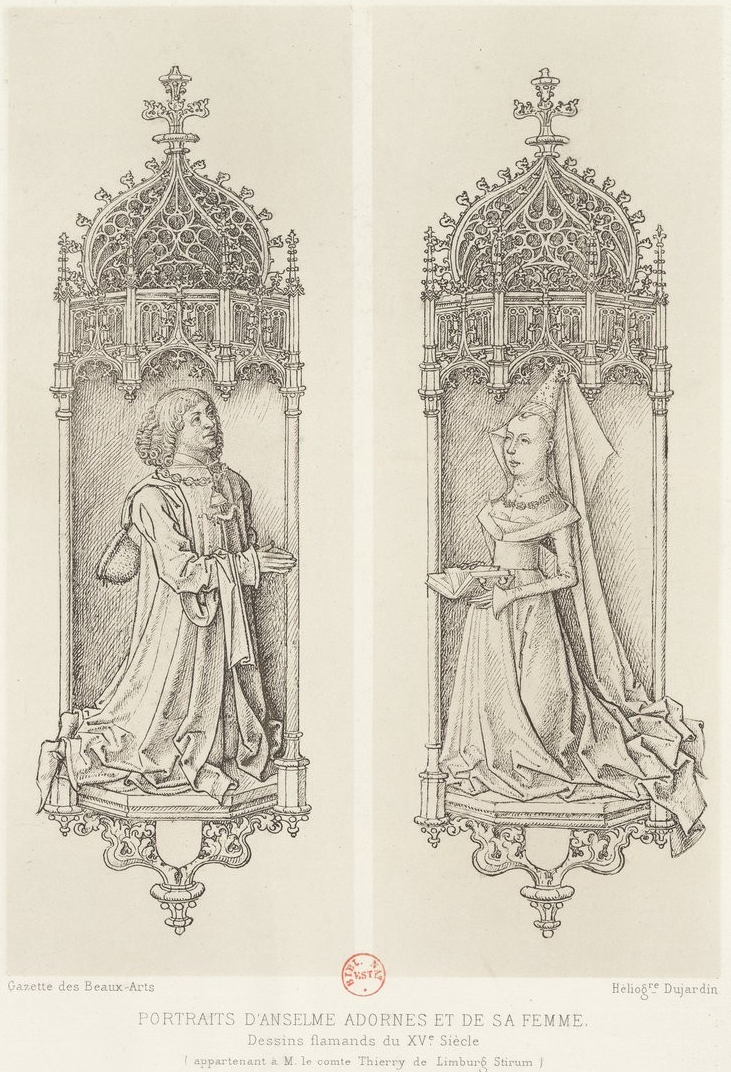

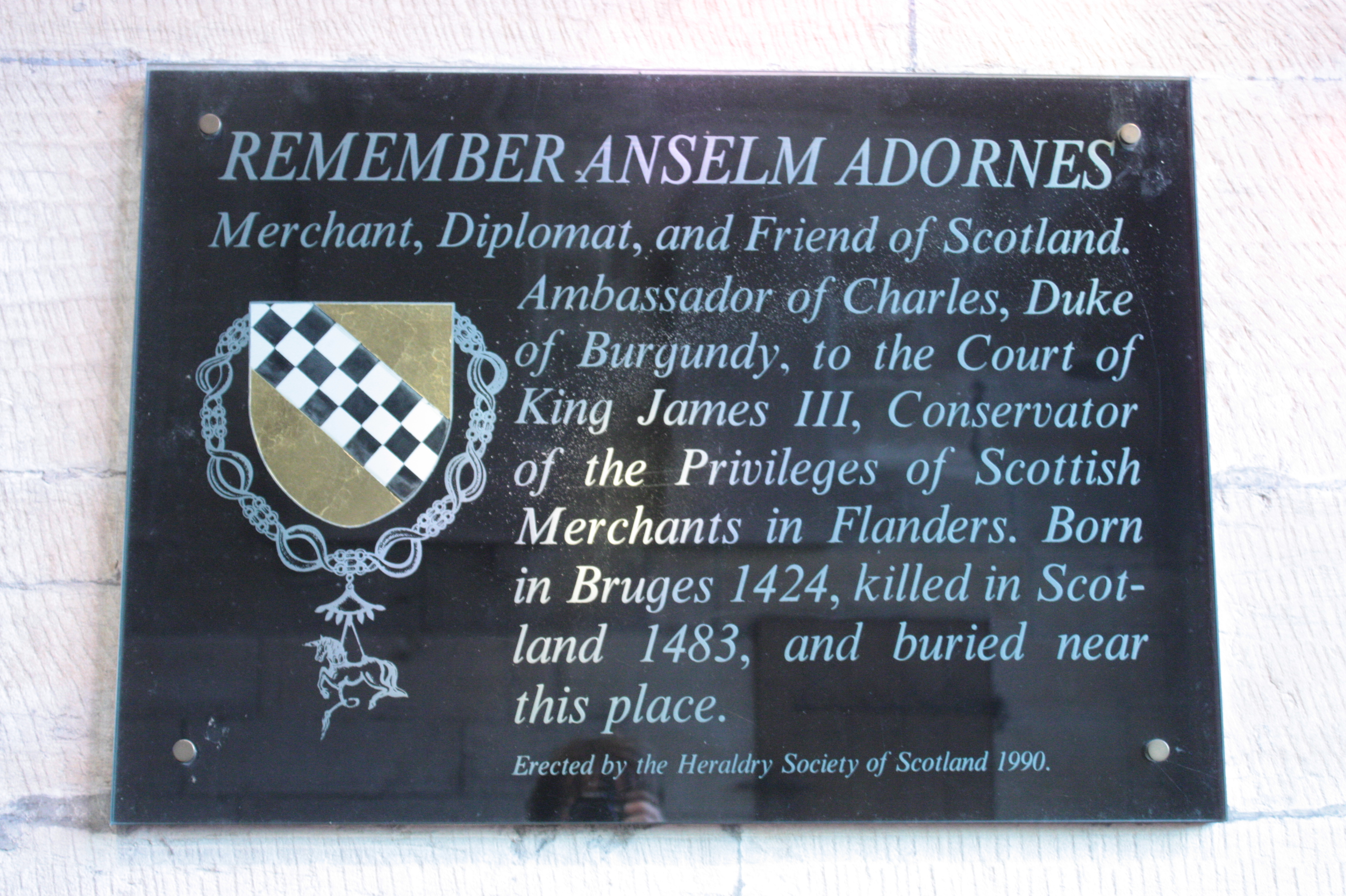
Plaque to Anselm Adornes, St Michael's Church, Linlithgow

Anselm Adornes (8 December 1424 in Bruges – 1483 in Scotland), also known as Anselm Adorno, was a merchant, patron, politician and diplomat, who belonged to the fifth generation of the Adornes family to live in Bruges.

== Family ==
Anselm Adornes was the son of Peter II Adornes and Elizabeth Brader Ickx. His ancestors were from Genoa. In the second half of the 13th century the family moved to Flanders: Opicius Adornes moved in 1269 when Count Guy of Dampierre arrived. His son Oppicius II (the younger) settled around 1300 in Bruges. The Adornes family was closely involved in international trade and in the administration of the city of Bruges.

In 1443 Anselm married Margriet van der Banck (1427-1480) of Bruges, and they had 16 children:

- Jan Adornes (1444-1511), canon of Aberdeen and Lille
- Elisabeth Adornes (1445-1453)
- Margriet Adornes (b. 1448), kartuizerin in Sint-Anna-to-Woestijne
- Maarten Adornes II (1450-1507), prior of the Carthusian monastery Genadedal
- Aernoud Adornes (1451-1517) married to Agnes of Nieuwenhove, as a widower, and became a priest resident in St. Anna-to-Woestijne
- Jacob Adornes (b. 1453)
- Anselm Adornes (b. 1454), member of the Order of St John
- Catherine Adornes (b. 1456), Clarisse-Colettine in Ghent
- Ludovica Adornes (b. 1457), nun augustines
- Elisabeth Adornes (° 1459 of 1466)
- Pieter Adornes IV (1460-1496), married to Catherine Uutenhove, lived in Ghent and was a widower brother-less observant
- Anthony Adornes (1462-1492), canon of Aberdeen
- Maria Adornes (b. 1463) married the Baenst Joos, parents of Joseph, Guido and Jan de Baenst
- Gandulphus Adornes (b. 1465)
- Elizabeth Adornes (b. 1466) married Wulfaert the Lichterveldestraat
- Livina Adornes

Adornes' high status in Bruges was demonstrated by the people who agreed to be the godparents of his children, among whom were: Louis de Gruuthuse, Tommaso Portinari, Abbot Jan Crabbe, Bailiff Jan de Baenst, Colard Dault and members of the Genoese families Doria and Spinola.

Around the same year of his marriage Adornes emerged in public life in Bruges. From 1444 to 1449 he participated in the tournaments organised by the chivalrous Company of the White Bear. He was an organiser of the Tournament of the Golden Tree, held in July 1468 to celebrate the marriage of Margaret of York and Charles the Bold, Duke of Burgundy, following their Joyous Entry into the city. In August 1468, Adornes and Jan Metteneye were sent as diplomats to Scotland to renegotiate trade agreements.

== City Council ==
Anselm Adornes, succeeding his father and his uncle, joined the city council. Thus he was

- Head of the Sint-Nicholas Estonians in 1447-48 and 1450–51
- Head of the Sint-Nicholas Estonians in 1456-57, 1458–59, 1460–61, 1462–63, 1473–74
- Councillor in 1444-45 and 1452–53
- Treasurer in 1459-1460
- Committed to urban finances of 1463 to 1468
- Mayor in 1475-76

He was also:

- Orator of the Proosse (inherited function for the glory of the Deanery, like a ship)
- Guardian of the Bruges leper colony

== Nadir ==
The year 1477 marked a peak and a low point in his career. After the death of Charles the Bold there were riots in Bruges. Mary of Burgundy charged Louis of Gruuthuse and his son John together with Anselm Adornes and several other senior Bruges dignitaries to provide a peaceful solution. However, this did not prevent more riots occurring on 26 March. Adornes was arrested with fifteen other former city officials. It was suspected that they had used their positions for unlawful personal gain. However, these accusations came to nothing, and they were all released.

On 18 May 1477 a notable number of people, including Adornes, were again arrested by an agitated crowd. Along with Jan de Baenst and Paul of Overtvelt he was interrogated and tortured. All three confessed to having stolen funds from the city treasury. They escaped death but the Baenst and Van Overtvelt saw all their goods confiscated and were forced to withdraw to life in a monastery. Adornes's punishment was milder, but he too was paraded in his underwear, barefooted and bareheaded, accompanied by the sheriff to ask forgiveness.

He had to pay four times the amount he had confessed to stealing from the city treasury and was banned from public office.

== Trade ==
Adornes followed in the footsteps of his grandfather Peter I Adornes by being active in international trade. He mediated primarily in transactions with Genoese merchants. Until his death he maintained commercial relations with Genoa and also Spain. His trade was mainly related to the importation of alum and cloth from Tournai and from England.

He did not live in his house next to the Jerusalemkerk, but at the Verversdijk (Dyers' Dyke, located between the Scots and the Scots Dyke Place) where he owned a large complex, with stacking spaces, and warehouses in the midst of the Scottish merchants.

== Relations with Scotland ==
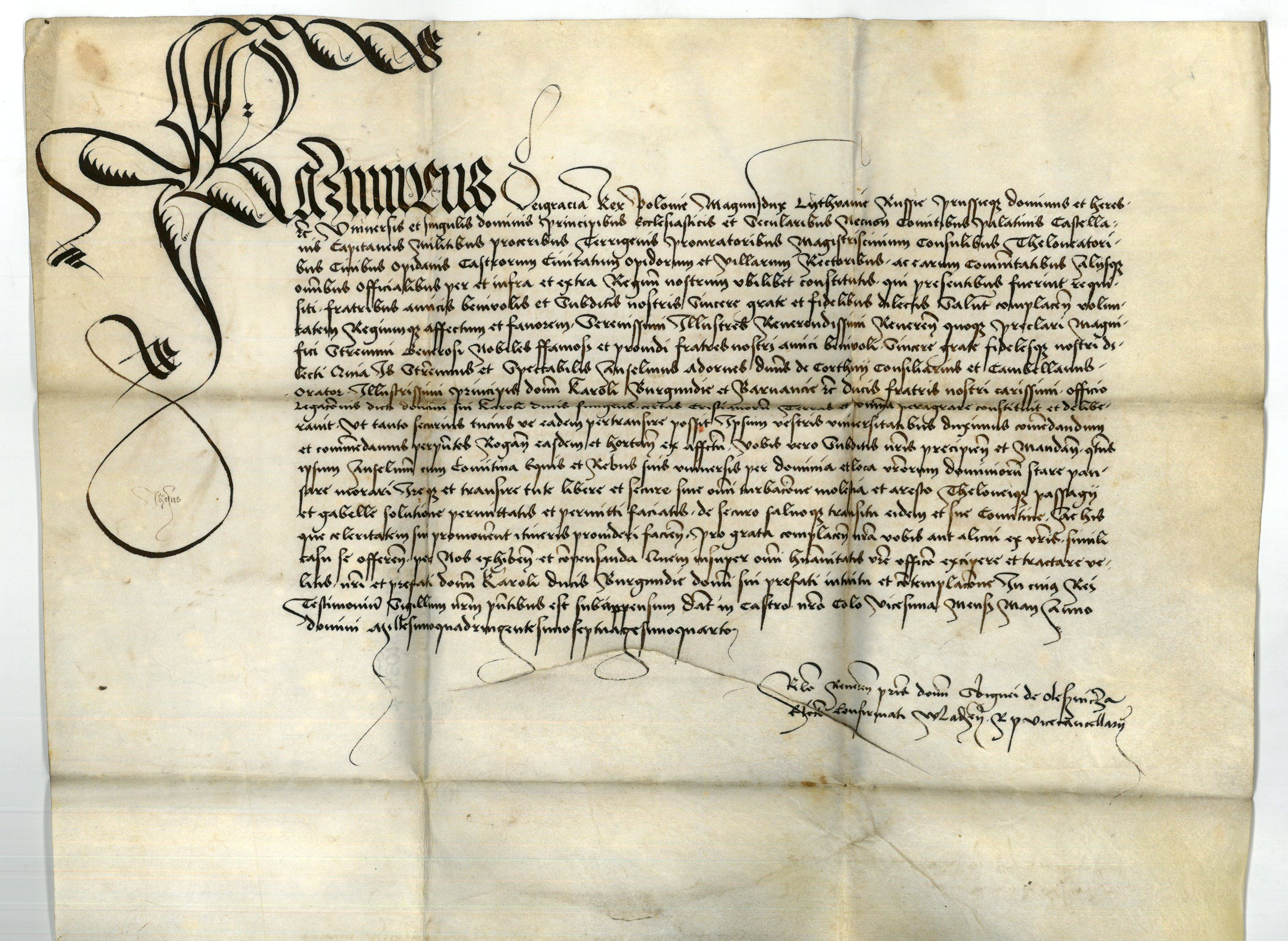
Secretarial letter of safe conduct for Anselm Adornes for a Burgundian embassy to Persia (ruled at the time by Uzun Hasan), issued in the name of Casimir IV Jagiellon, King of Poland

Anselm Adornes and Stevin Anguys acted as Conservators of Privileges for Scottish merchants in Bruges. In 1467 the Scottish Parliament forbade trade with Flanders and the Scottish merchants had to leave Bruges. In the autumn of 1468, Anselm Adornes travelled to Scotland, at the head of a diplomatic mission to negotiate the return of the Scottish merchants to Bruges. He reached Scotland through England and obtained from Edward IV a safe conduct (10 October 1468) for a pilgrimage to the Holy Sepulchre in Jerusalem.

The negotiations with James III of Scotland and the Scottish Parliament and were successful, and the merchants returned in the spring of 1470.

The contacts he established with the Scottish Court meant a significant increase in his social status, not only in the county of Flanders, but also in Scotland. He was overwhelmed by favours from King James III. On 15 January 1469, Adornes was knighted by James and appointed to his council. At some point after this the King presented Adornes with a livery collar. Though not given a title at this time, Bruges documents on 3 June 1469 refer to him as Lord of Corthuy, a form of the Scottish Barony of Cortachy in Angus. From 1472 the title is also accorded to Adornes in official Scottish documents.

On 19 February 1470, with negotiations for the return of the Scottish merchants close to concluding, Adornes left Bruges for his pilgrimage to the Holy Sepulchre in Jerusalem. The journey was of interest not only to Edward IV but also James III, to whom the relation of his travels was later dedicated, and who, in a letter dated 10 June 1472 indicated he gave authority to Adorne to represent the Scottish Crown in Rome and among the Moslems of the East. On 11 February 1470 a Scottish embassy led by Sir Alexander Napier arrived in Bruges and in early April, an agreement was reached. Adornes eventually returned to Bruges on 18 April 1471.

On 25 July 1471, Adornes was issued a 6-month safe conduct to convey Mary Stewart, Countess of Arran, sister of James III, to Scotland. She was returning from Denmark in an attempt to have her husband Thomas Boyd, 1st Earl of Arran cleared of all charges laid against him. The entourage embarked at Calais on 4 October 1471 and successfully returned to Scotland, where James immediately detained Mary in Dean Castle at Kilmarnock until her marriage was annulled in 1473.

In return for Adornes' faithful service, James III, on 18 April 1472, granted to Anselm Adorne de Cortoquhy, King's Knight, lands formerly held by Lord Robert Boyd. On 10 June 1472 the office of the privilege of the Scottish merchants at Bruges in the realm of the Duke of Burgundy (James III was a first cousin twice removed of Charles Duke of Burgundy, whose paternal aunt Mary was James's maternal great-grandmother). Adornes also received income from confiscated property in Forfar.

In 1477, after the collapse of his fortunes in Bruges, Adornes returned to Scotland where he quickly re-established himself as one of James III's close companions and was appointed keeper of the king's palace at Linlithgow. He survived the rebellion against the king in 1482 but was murdered in the following year in circumstances which remain obscure.

== Jerusalemkerk ==
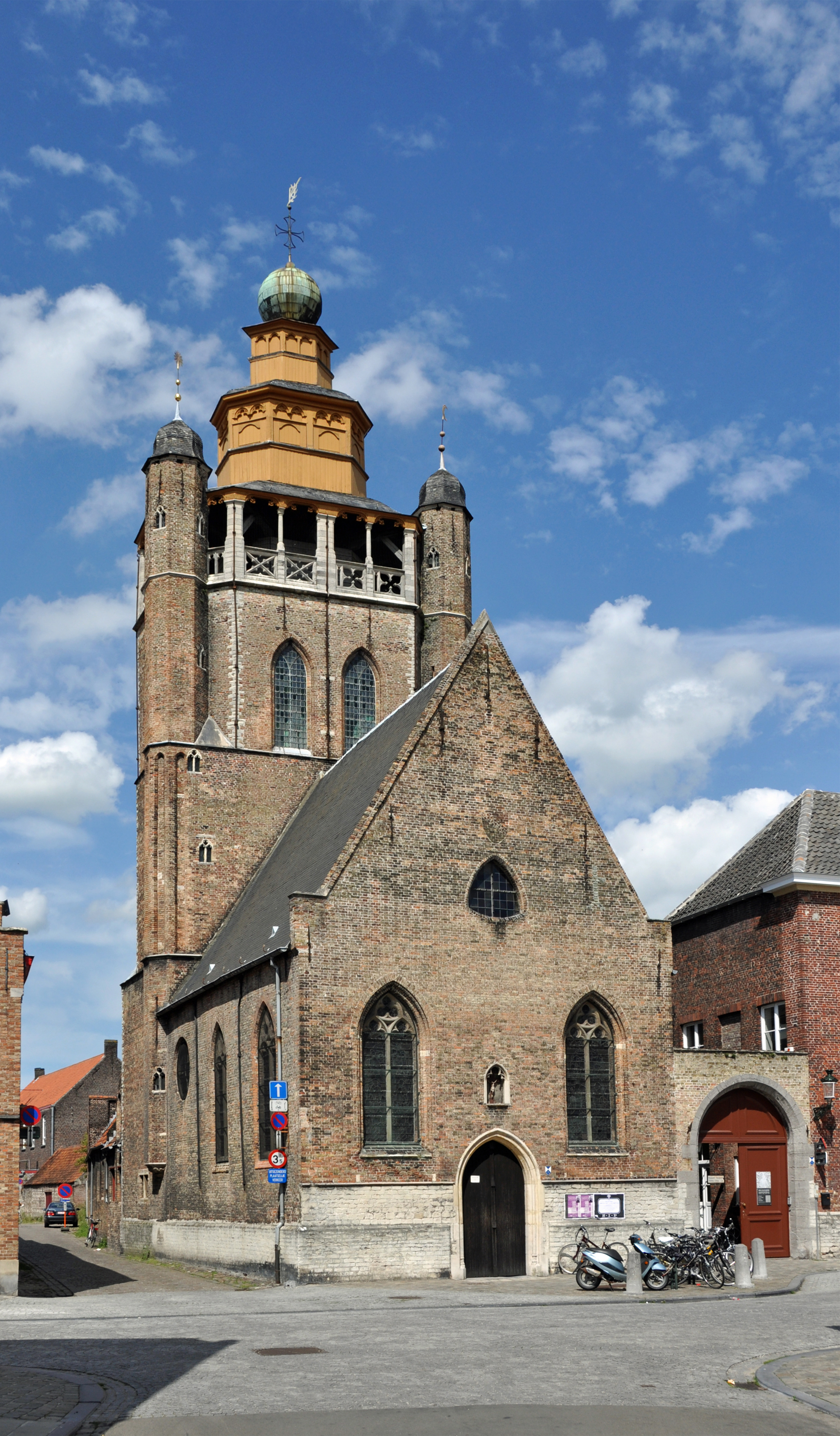
Jeruzalemkerk, Bruges

The Adornes family had a tradition of the veneration of the holy places of Jerusalem. In 1428, Pieter II Adornes and Jacob Adornes, grandsons of Opicius the younger and Margaret of Aartrijke, started building the remarkable Jerusalemkerk in Bruges. The Jerusalem Church was intended to be a copy of the Church of the Holy Sepulchre in Jerusalem. Some sources state incorrectly that Anselm Adornes built the church. He was a child when it was consecrated in 1429.

In 1470, Adornes undertook a pilgrimage on foot to Jerusalem, accompanied by his son Jan Adornes. Jan wrote a memoir of their experiences. He became a canon at St. Peter's collegiate church in Lille; a copy of the manuscript is preserved in their archives.

After their return, Adornes enhanced the building. The tomb in the centre of the church is for himself and his wife Margriet. Today the church is known as the Jeruzalemkapel and is part of the Adornesdomein historic site in Bruges.

== Other Diplomatic Activities ==
Adornes undertook other diplomatic missions in the service of the Duke of Burgundy in the 1460s and 1470s. The Duke had plans to undertake a crusade and as Adorne had visited Jerusalem, he could give him advice. Adorne also travelled to Poland, where he was received by King Casimir IV.

In 1473 he negotiated on behalf of the city of Bruges for the cost of Tommaso Portinari's galley, the St. Matthew, which had been hijacked in the North Sea by Paul Beneke. Among other precious goods, the ship carried a large triptych by Hans Memling, the Last Judgment. The negotiations failed, and the painting is still in Gdańsk, in the National Museum.

In 1477, 1479 and 1480, Adornes traveled to Scotland. After he returned from this last trip, his wife died. In 1482 he sailed back to Scotland. His contacts with King James III led him to command a military expedition in Linlithgow. When Adornes then undertook a pilgrimage, he stayed in a monastery in North Berwick, and was there on 23 January 1483 attacked by an armed gang who put him to death. He was interred in Linlithgow, but his heart was buried in the Jerusalemkerk later that year.

== Contribution to the Arts ==
Anselm Adornes' interest in the arts may be seen in:

- Completion of the Jerusalemkerk.
- He may have been an agent of Hugo van der Goes for the work known as the Trinity Altarpiece, containing panels with portraits of James III and his son, and of his wife Margaret of Denmark. The altarpiece is now on loan to the National Museum of Scotland in Edinburgh
- He may have been the inspiration for a chapel based on the Holy Sepulchre, which was founded in Restalrig.
- As part of the Brotherhood of Our Lady of the Dry Tree, Adornes was interested in polyphonic religious music and commissioned by King James III in 1472 he provided for the training of a lute player.
- Adornes was in contact with the humanist Filippo Buonaccorsi
- He had great interest in manuscripts and literary texts. He himself personally transcribed text of Cicero, his Somnium Scipionis

== Influence ==
The family belonged to the patrician class in Bruges and held regular kinds of functions relating to city council and the Duke of Burgundy. Adornes himself had good relations with Flanders, Italy and Scotland, and he remained in close contact with the Scottish King James III, from whom he received lucrative contracts.

== Appearance in Literature ==
Anselm Adornes is one of the main figures in these historical novels:

- The blue boat Lady of Hoet (Lannoo, 2002)
- Onrustvlinder by Anna Coudenys (Manteau, 2008).
- Adornes (as Anselm Adorne) figures prominently throughout the 8-book series of historical novels known as The House of Niccolò (1986-2000) by Dorothy Dunnett. The series embraces the years 1460-1483, beginning in Bruges, where Adorne becomes a mentor to the title character, and includes the pilgrimage to the Holy Land. The final novel encompasses Adorne's violent death.
