= Steelyard =

Trading post of the Hanseatic League in London

Coordinates: 51°30′41″N 0°05′26″W

The Steelyard, from the Middle Low German Stâlhof (sample yard), was the kontor (foreign trading post) of the Hanseatic League in London, and their main trading base in England, between the 13th and 16th centuries. The main goods that the League exported from London were wool and from the 14th century woollen cloths. An important import good was beeswax. The kontor tended to be dominated by Rhenish and Westphalian traders, especially from Cologne.

The Steelyard was not the only Hanseatic trading post in England. There were a number of Hanseatic factories on the English east coast, like the remaining Hanseatic warehouse in King's Lynn, Norfolk.

== Name ==
The name seems to indicate the practice of tagging samples (stalen) of inspected wool with a seal.

In Charles Kingsford's commentary on John Stow's A Survey of London (1598 edition) the Middle Low German name Stâlhof is the older usage, appearing as early as 1320. Kingsford traces the first reference to it as the Steelyard to 1382. In 1394 an English merchant writing from Danzig has: In civitate Londonia[...]in Curia Calibis: "In the city of London[...]at the court of steel" (chalybs). Kingsford concludes that Steelyard is a mistaken translation of Stâlhof.

The kontor was also called the Esterlinghall ("Easterling hall") in Middle English, in 1340 for the first time.

== Location ==
A commemorative plaque placed in 2005 at Cannon Street station, near the location of the Steelyard

The Steelyard was located on the north bank of the Thames by the outflow of the Walbrook, in the Dowgate ward of the City of London. The site is bounded by Cousin Lane on the west, Upper Thames Street on the north, and Allhallows Lane on the east, an area of 5,250 m^{2} or 1.3 acres. It is now covered by Cannon Street station and commemorated in the names of Steelyard Passage and Hanseatic Walk. The Steelyard, like other Hansa stations, was a separate walled community with its own warehouses on the river, its own weigh house, chapel, counting houses, a guildhall, cloth halls, wine cellars, kitchens, and residential quarters. The kontor could be accessed by sea-going ships.

As a church the Germans used former All-Hallows-the-Great, since there was only a small chapel on their own premises.

In 1988 remains of the former Hanseatic kontor, once the largest medieval trading complex in Britain, were uncovered by archaeologists during maintenance work on Cannon Street Station.

== History ==
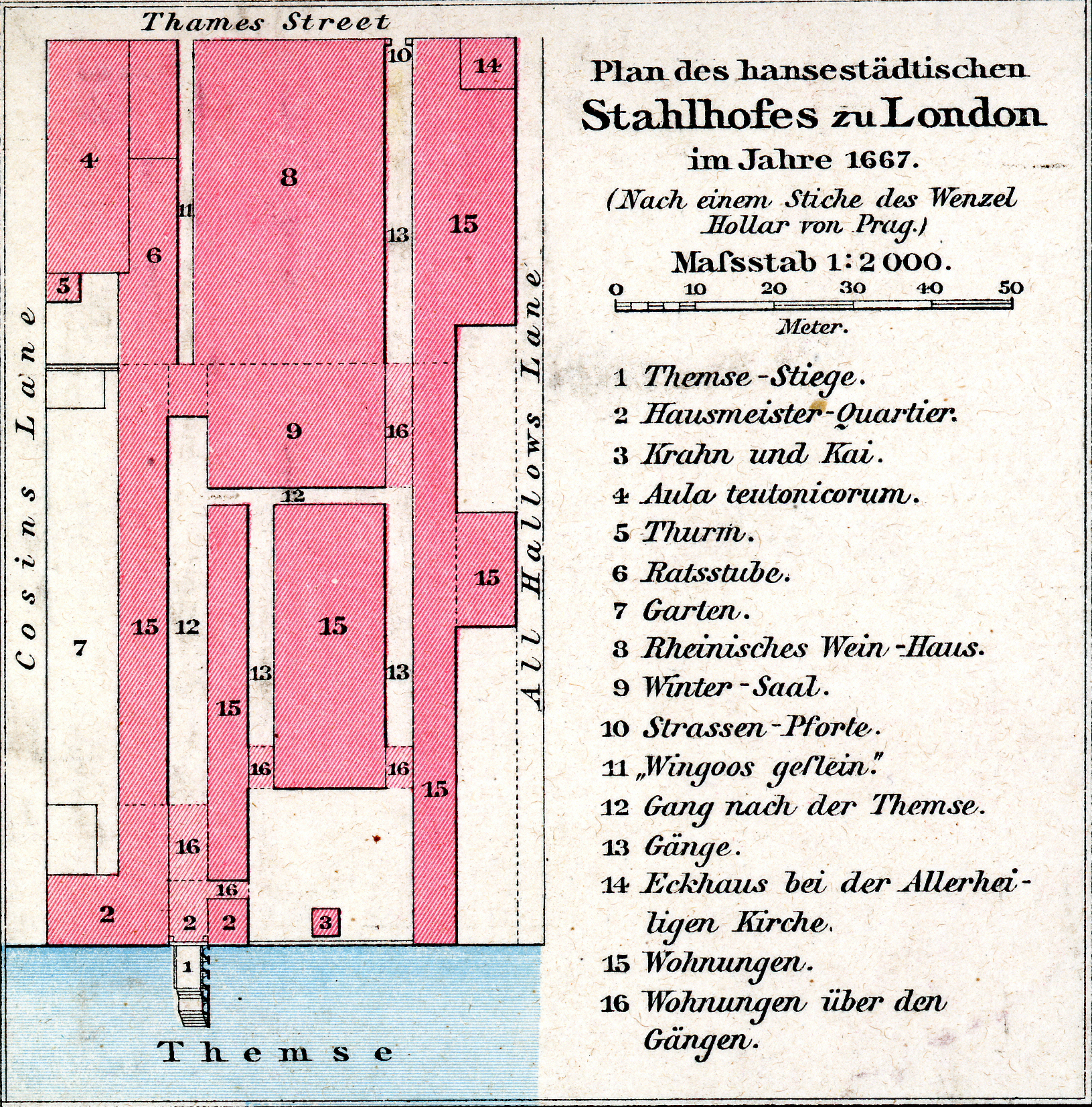
A plan of the Steelyard from Johann Gustav Droysen's Atlas, claimed to be as it was in 1667

Merchants from Cologne bought a building at the corner of Thames Street and Cousin Lane in the 1170s, though they seem to have used it as early as 1157, and it became known as the "Germans' Guildhall" (Gildahalda teutonicorum). Henry II of England granted very extensive privileges to traders from Cologne in 1175/76 in an attempt to limit the power of Flemish merchants who then controlled the English wool trade. This group from Cologne effectively controlled the trade of Rhine wine and acquired a building called the gildhalla from then on too. They are alluded to in the De itinere navali, an account of crusaders from Lübeck for whom the kontor arranged the purchase of a replacement cog in the summer of 1189. The privileges of the Guildhall existed alongside individual cities' privileges. Low German traders from the area around the Baltic Sea appeared in England too around this time, but they directed their trade more at English towns up north.

=== Hanseatic kontor ===
The merchant communities from Westphalia and the Rhineland and from the Baltic formed a joint venture by the mid 13th century. They took over the hegemony in the trade with England from the Flemings later in the century and even began to get involved in the export of English wool to Flanders.

The first mention of a Hansa Almaniae (a "German Hansa") in English records is in 1282, concerning merely the community of the London trading post. This was a union of town merchant guilds (hanses) from Cologne, or the Rhineland, and Lübeck and Hamburg. It was possibly more the result of government pressure from London and the English king than a free decision. The settlement was only later made official as the Steelyard and confirmed in tax and customs concessions granted by Edward I, in a Carta Mercatoria ("merchant charter") of 1303. This led to constant friction over the legal position of English merchants in the Hanseatic towns and Hanseatic privileges in England, which repeatedly ended in acts of violence. Not only English wool but finished cloth was exported through the Hansa, who controlled the trade in English cloth-making centres.

==== Trade conflicts ====
After the treaty of Stralsund the Hansards drove out rival merchants from Scania. English traders were arrested and their goods confiscated. The English king imposed new tonnage and poundage in 1371/72, that covered Hanseatic goods too. The Hanseatic towns and traders thought it violated their privileges. At the same time English traders entered the Baltic and especially Prussian trade, demanding equal reciprocal trading rights. A trade conflict began in 1385 when an English privateer fleet seized a number of Hanseatic ships near Bruges in the Zwin. Some ship were Prussian and the grandmaster of the Teutonic Order confiscated English goods. Richard II retaliated and confiscated Prussian goods in England to compensate the English merchants. When negotiations failed, the grandmaster banned English imports and exports of forests to England in 1386. The compromise at the treaty of Marienburg of August 1388 restored trade ties but failed to address the underlying problems. But when a new grand master cancelled the treaty of Marienburg in 1398 after Prussian towns complained, Henry IV did not retaliate and instead reconfirmed the Hanseatic privileges. A second treaty of Marienburg and a treaty between England and the wider Hanseatic League with promises about compensation and protection against pirates were agreed in 1405, followed by treaties in 1408 and 1409. However the underlying problems of tonnage and poundage and the lack of reciprocal rights for English merchants remained.

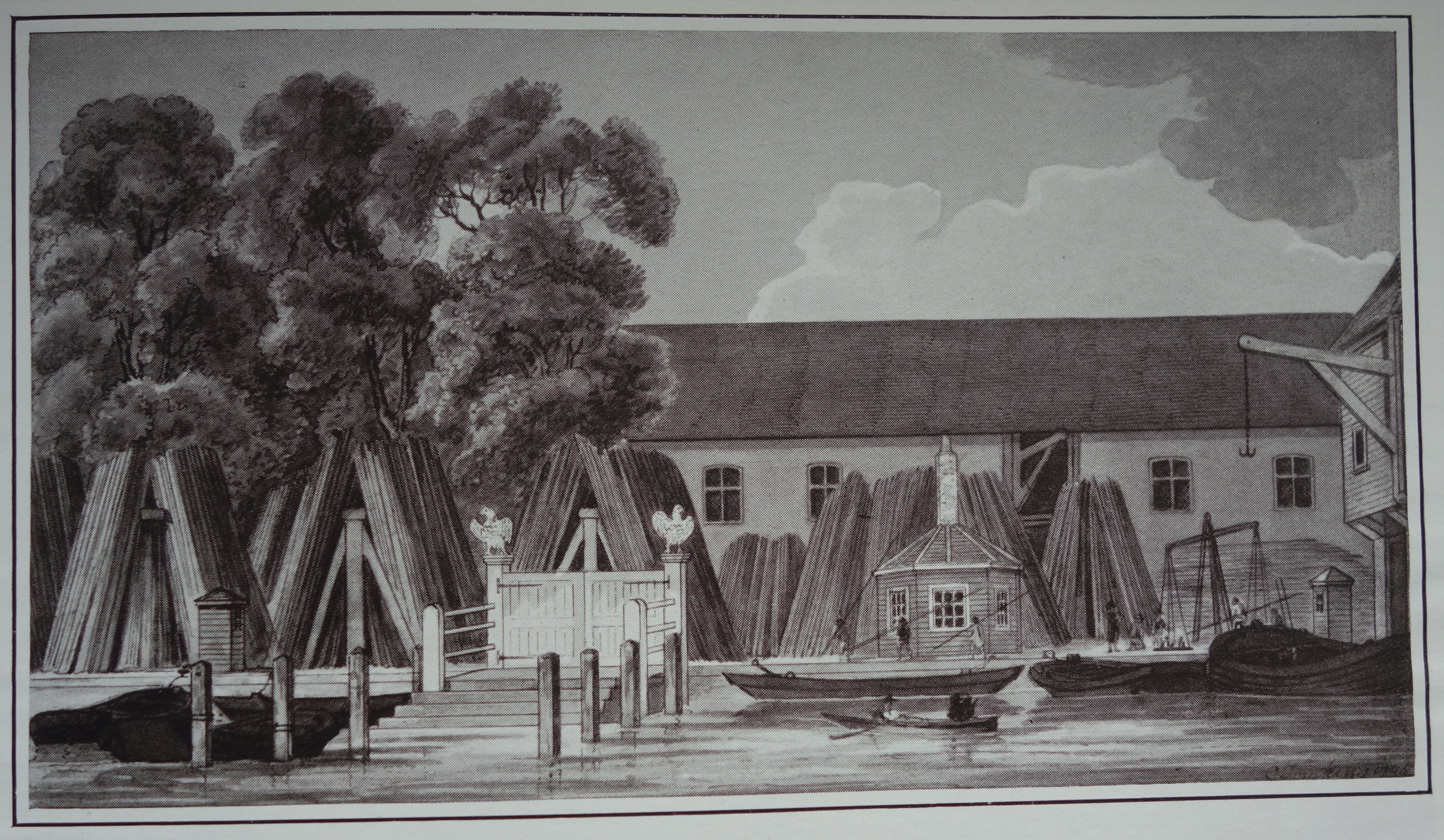
A reproduced painting of the Steelyard (Souvenir of the British Exhibit in the Hall of Nations IPA Leipzig, 1930)

By 1420 the Hanseatic League's trade in England had decreased in importance. Cologne remained dominant in the Hanseatic trade on England in the 15th century, and Danzig had a dominant role too.

The English Parliament in 1431 increased poundage by half for foreign merchants. In 1434 the Tagfahrt (de) (the Hanse representative body) finally began negotiations and started a blockade at the same time. The conflict was resolved in 1437 with the Second Treaty of London, when Hanseatic privileges were renewed and the new duties were removed. The Teutonic grandmaster did not ratify the treaty, pressed by Danzig, but England still enforced it despite unfulfilled demands for equal privileges for English traders in 1442 and 1446.

Another English attack on Hanseatic ships, this time a Wendish and Prussian salt fleet, in May 1449 led to another crisis. Lübeck instructed German traders to leave England in 1450 and blocked English trade through the Øresund in 1452 by an agreement with Christian I of Denmark. England was weakened after the Hundred Years' War and briefly restored the Hanseatic privileges, though another salt fleet from Lübeck was taken in 1458. Incidents like that kept tensions high.

==== Anglo-Hanseatic War ====
Edward IV held the Hanseatic League responsible, when English ships were attacked in the Øresund by Danes in 1468, and German merchants in London were arrested and convicted by the crown council. The Hanseatic cities were open to negotiation but rejected any common Hanseatic liability and called for an embargo against England. The merchants of Cologne were exempted from the ruling and could trade unhindered, which served to foment dissension among Hansards.

Meanwhile Henry VI was put back on the throne in 1470 as part of the Wars of the Roses. Cologne was temporarily excluded from the League and its privileges in April 1471. Edward IV was helped by Hanseatic ships in his landing in May to retake power, but he reaffirmed Cologne's exclusive privileges in July. A war of piracy called the Anglo-Hanseatic War began against England, the main effort came from ships from Danzig, and much of the rest from Lübeck. One of their captains was the famous Paul Beneke, who commanded the formidable Peter von Danzig.

Negotiations began in 1473 and Edward IV was open to make large concessions for peace. Hanseatic demands were very excessive and Edward did not transfer the property of the Steelyard and the outposts in Lynn and Boston to the Hanseatic towns, but they achieved a very favourable peace from the English commissioners in Utrecht in 1474: many regulations from the Second Treaty of London of 1437 were reconfirmed and the demand for reciprocity on behalf of English merchants was dropped, though this result was against the background of the reduction of the Hanseatic trade's importance over the 15th century.

==== After the Anglo-Hanseatic War ====
Hanse Merchants Act 1503
- Act of Parliament
- Parliament of England
- Long title: For þͤ Stillyard.
- Citation: 19 Hen. 7. c. 23
- Territorial extent: England and Wales

Dates
- Royal assent: 25 January 1504 (Note: Start of session.)
- Commencement: 25 January 1504
- Repealed: 24 June 1822
Other legislation
Repealed by	Repeal of Acts Concerning Importation Act 1822

Status: Repealed

Text of statute as originally enacted

In 1475 the Hanseatic League purchased the London site outright and it became universally known as the Steelyard. The kontor then required that Hansards lived on the Steelyard. In exchange for the privileges the German merchants had to maintain Bishopsgate, one of the originally seven gates of the city, from where the roads led to their interests in Boston and Lynn. The Hanse Merchants Act 1503 (19 Hen. 7. c. 23) confirmed in law the exemption of the Hanseatic League from all laws that ordinarily applied to foreign merchants.

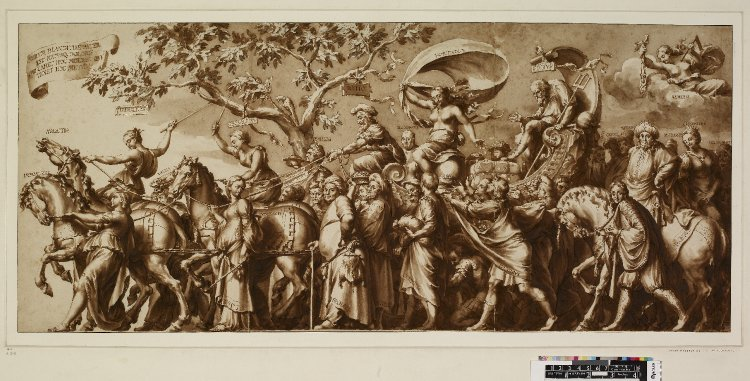
The Triumph of Riches

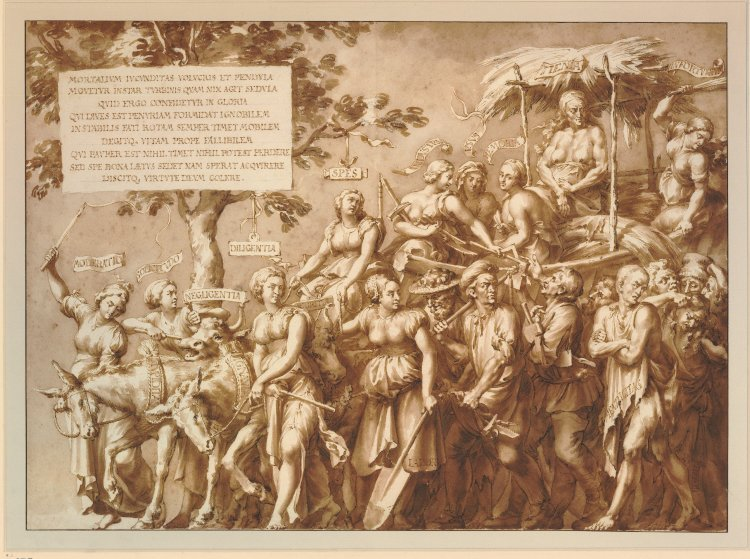
The Triumph of Poverty

Danzig and Cologne were still the dominant players in the Hansa's trade on England in the 16th century, but Hamburg achieved an important role by shipping German fabrics and Icelandic cod to England and English ink to the Netherlands. Hamburg's merchants became over time less involved in active trade with England, and let other parties carry goods instead.

Members of the Steelyard, normally stationed in London for only a few years, sat for a famous series of portraits by Hans Holbein the Younger in the 1530s, portraits which were so successful that the Steelyard merchants commissioned from Holbein the allegorical paintings The Triumph of Riches and The Triumph of Poverty for their Hall. Both were destroyed by a fire, but there are copies in the Ashmolean Museum in Oxford. Later merchants of the Steelyard were portrayed by Cornelis Ketel. There is a fine description of the Steelyard by John Stow.

==== Later conflicts and closures ====
The Steelyard's privileges were suspended in 1552.

One group that shipped trade goods for the merchant of Hamburg when they moved out of English active trade, was the Company of Merchant Adventurers of London. They got a residence for 10 years in Hamburg in 1567. Hamburg became a crucial market for the Merchant Adventurers after the loss of the Dutch market in the Dutch Revolt. Hanseatic trade with England was centred in Hamburg in those days.

Other Hanse towns resented the success of the Merchant Adventurers and wanted to secure the old favorable trade privileges that England suspended years ago. A Tagfahrt pressured Hamburg to close the Merchant Adventurers' trading post after the end of the agreement and Hamburg obeyed. England responded with countermeasures.

Queen Elizabeth suppressed the Steelyard and rescinded its privileges in 1598. James I reopened the Steelyard, but it never again carried the weight it formerly had in London. Most of the buildings were destroyed during the Great Fire of London in 1666. The land and buildings remained the property of the Hanseatic League, and were subsequently let as warehouses to merchants.

=== After the end of the Hanseatic League ===
The Hanseatic League was never officially dissolved but is considered to have disintegrated in 1669. Lübeck, Hamburg and Bremen would however continue to be known as the "Hanseatic Cities". Consulates of the Hanseatic cities provided indirect communication between Northern Germany and the British government during the European blockade of the Napoleonic Wars. Patrick Colquhoun was appointed as Resident Minister and Consul general by the Hanseatic cities of Hamburg in 1804 and by Bremen and Lübeck shortly after as the successor of Henry Heymann, who was also Stahlhofmeister, "master of the Steelyard". Colquhoun was valuable to those cities through their occupation by the French since he provided indirect communication between Northern Germany and the British Government, especially in 1808, when the three cities considered their membership in the Confederation of the Rhine. His son James Colquhoun was his successor as Consul of the Hanseatic cities in London.

Lübeck, Bremen and Hamburg only sold their common property, the London Steelyard, to the South Eastern Railway in 1852. The buildings were demolished in 1863. Cannon Street station was built on the site and opened in 1866.

== Organisation and life ==
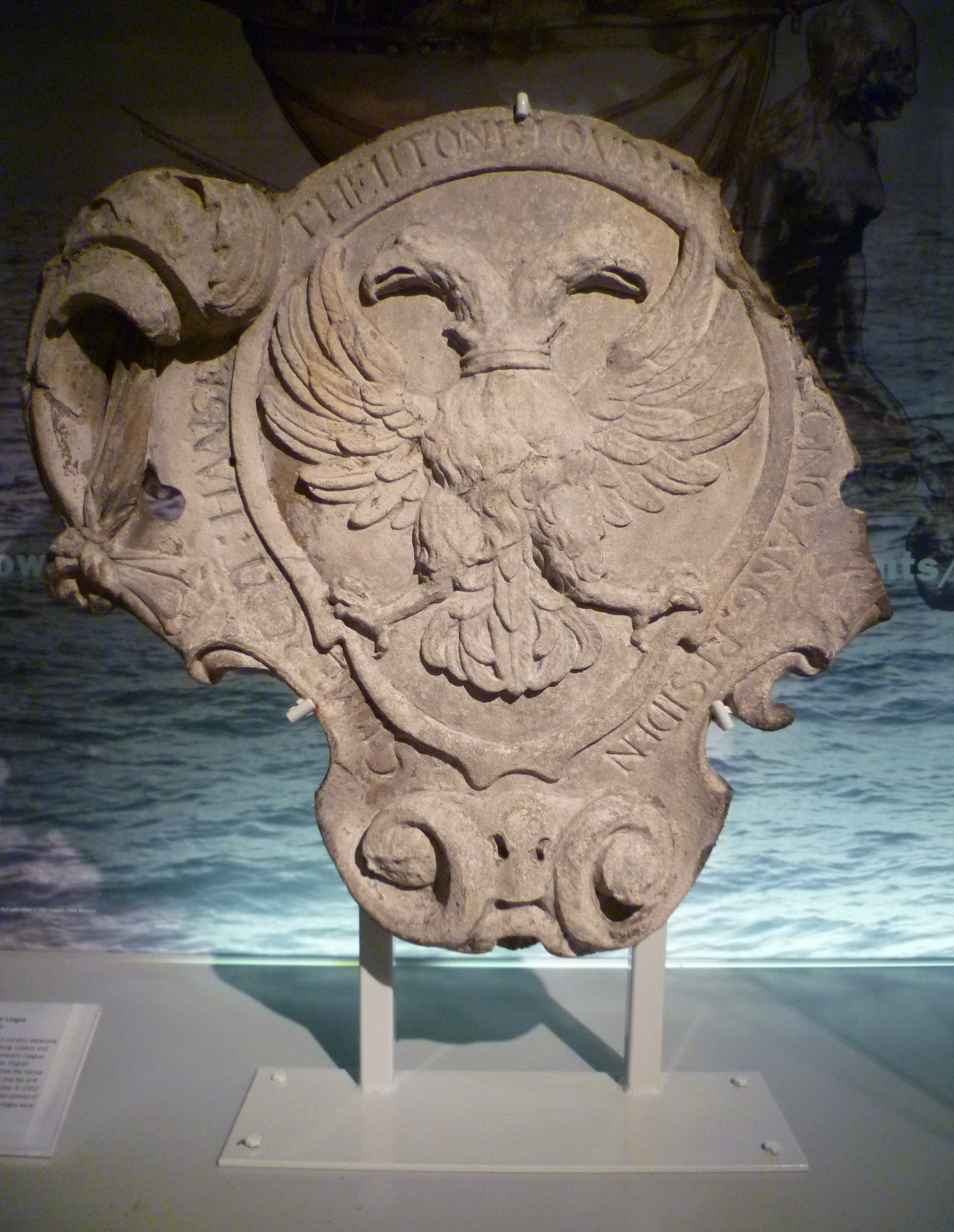
Caius Gabriel Cibber: The arms of the Steelyard (c. 1670) on display in the Museum of London

The Steelyard was, like the other kontors, a legal person established as a merchant corporation (universitas mercatorum) in a foreign trading city to facilitate Hanseatic trade. It had its own treasury, seal, code of rules, legal power to enforce rules on residents and administration. Security was the primary reason for establishing kontors, but they were also important for inspecting the quality of trade goods and diplomacy with local and regional authorities.

The Steelyard was led by an alderman, who was the chief juridical authority and diplomatic representative. There was also an English alderman from the late 14th century, an arrangement that was unique to London. The aldermen were assisted by achteinen, assistants or deputies. Around the mid 15th century the position of clerk, who was legally trained and performed secretarial duties. The Hanseatic merchants in London were grouped in geographical categories called "thirds" (German: Drittel). One third was formed by the area of Cologne, the left bank of the Rhine and Guelders. A second by the Wendish, Saxon and Westphalian towns and the right bank of the Rhine. The final third was made up of Livonian, Prussian and Gotlandic towns. The German alderman and his deputies were not allowed to come from the same third, so representation of all regional merchant groups' interests was ensured. A similar division of third existed at the Kontor of Bruges, but the London thirds had much less independence.

The Hansards lived in the Steelyard at a relatively closed off area, more so than at Bryggen, and they certainly were not as integrated into the host city as at the kontor of Bruges. They had however many ties with Londoners, for example Englishmen acted as executors for Hansards, and merchants rented rooms from the English, so they were not nearly as segregated as at Novgorod's Peterhof. The kontor was in the middle of the town on the Thames, but this also made it easy to block off. London was a city with a more cosmopolitan, urban flair than the average Hanseatic hometown. Merchants operating out of the Steelyard were granted certain privileges and were exempt from customs duties and some taxes. In effect, the Steelyard was a separate and independent community, governed by the codes of the Hanseatic League, and enforced by the merchants' native cities.

The Steelyard had its own statutes, like any kontor, written in Middle Low German, the main language of the Hanseatic merchants. It applied to all traders of the Hanse who resided in London. In the 14th and early 15th century, most rules were introduced by the kontor's merchants, but after 1474 legislation was decided by the Hanseatic hometowns.

== Trade ==
The main export from England was wool, but from the late 14th century cloth became an important export good. The importance of London as an export harbour grew with this shift. London also supplied luxury goods, like spices and literature. Trade in London was not controlled by the Hansards, and they met traders from various places in Europe, offering the availability of exotic goods but showing also new ideas and customs.

Beeswax and fur were the most important of the imports goods, but the Hansards also imported salted herring, stockfish and beer to London.

== Steelyard balance ==
The Steelyard possibly gave its name to the steelyard balance, a type of portable balance, consisting of a suspended horizontal beam. An object to be weighed would be hung on the shorter end of the beam, while weights would be slid along the longer end, till the beam balanced. The weight could then be calculated by multiplying the sum of the known weights by the ratio of the distances from the beam's fulcrum.

== Gallery ==
Georg Giese from Danzig, 34-year-old German merchant at the Steelyard, painted in London by Hans Holbein in 1532

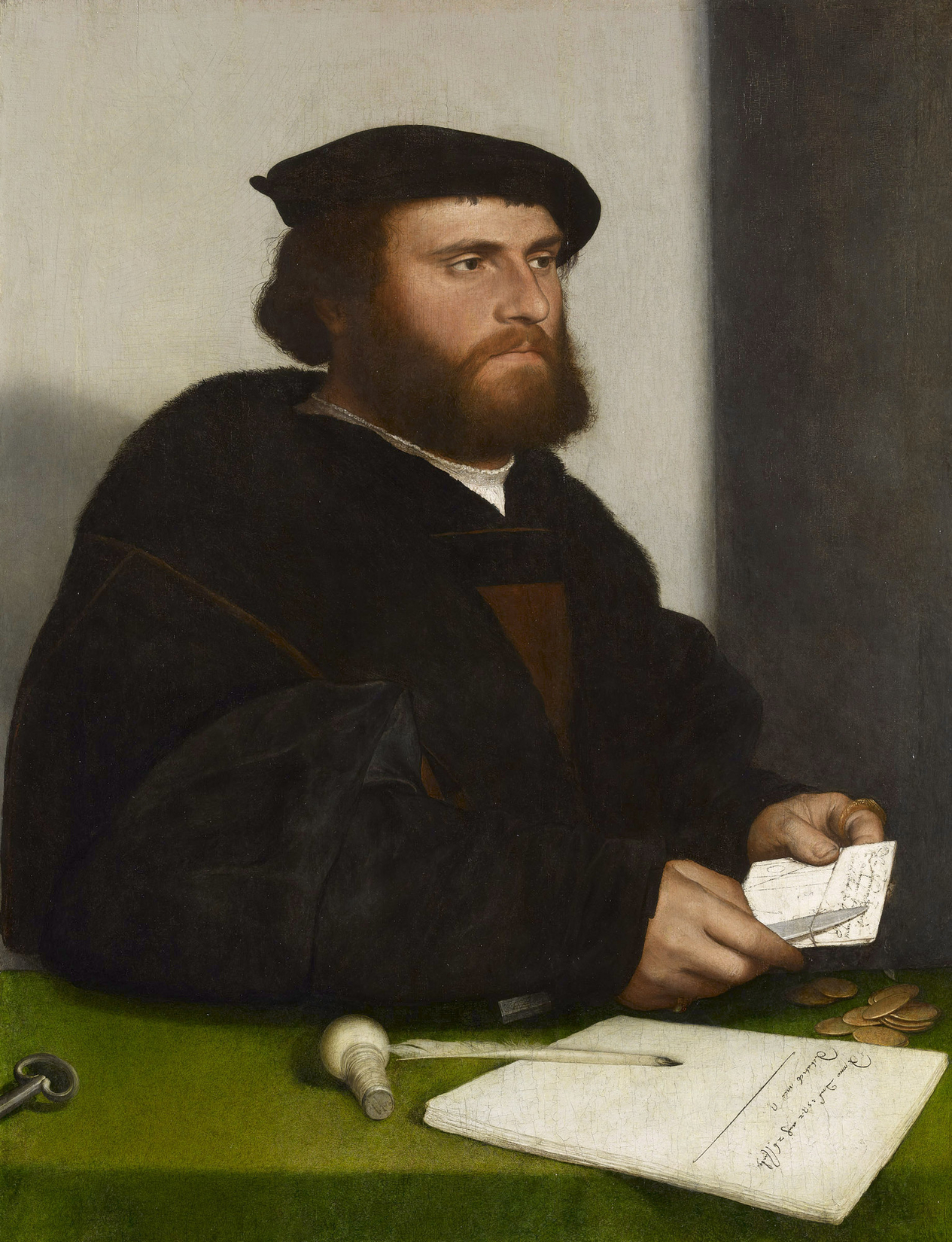
Hans of Antwerp 1532

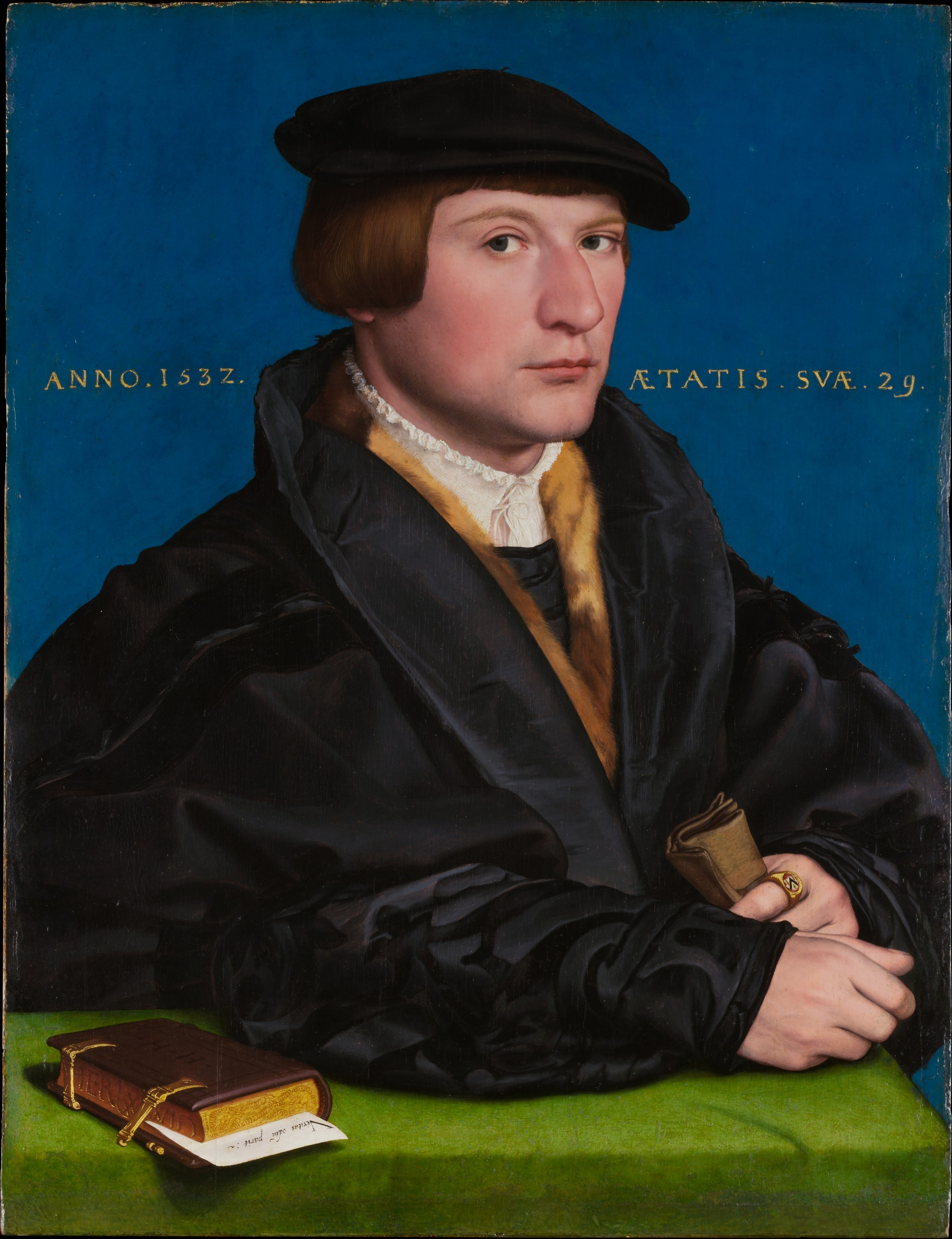
Hermann Wedigh 1532

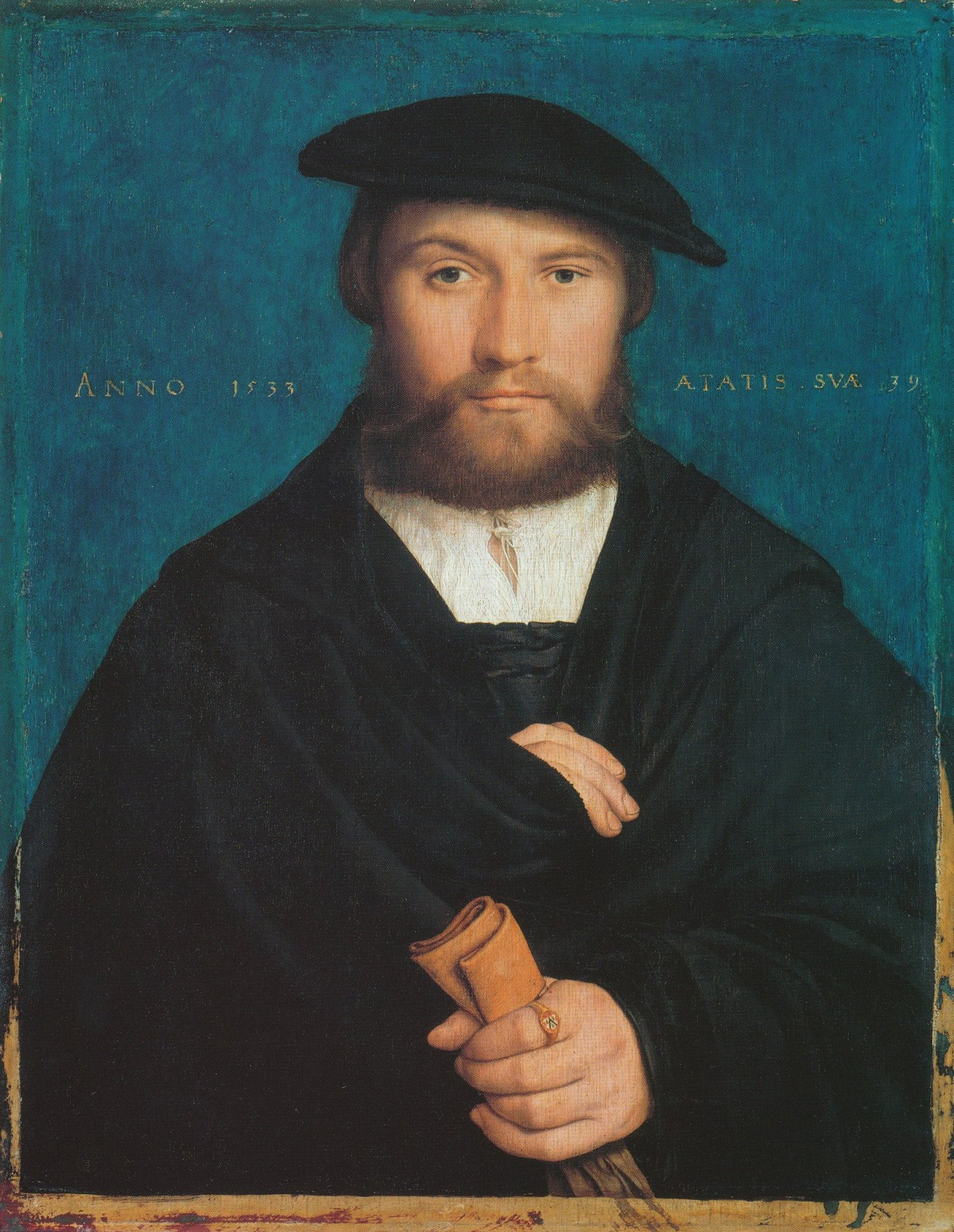
Hermann Hillebrandt Wedigh of Cologne; 1533

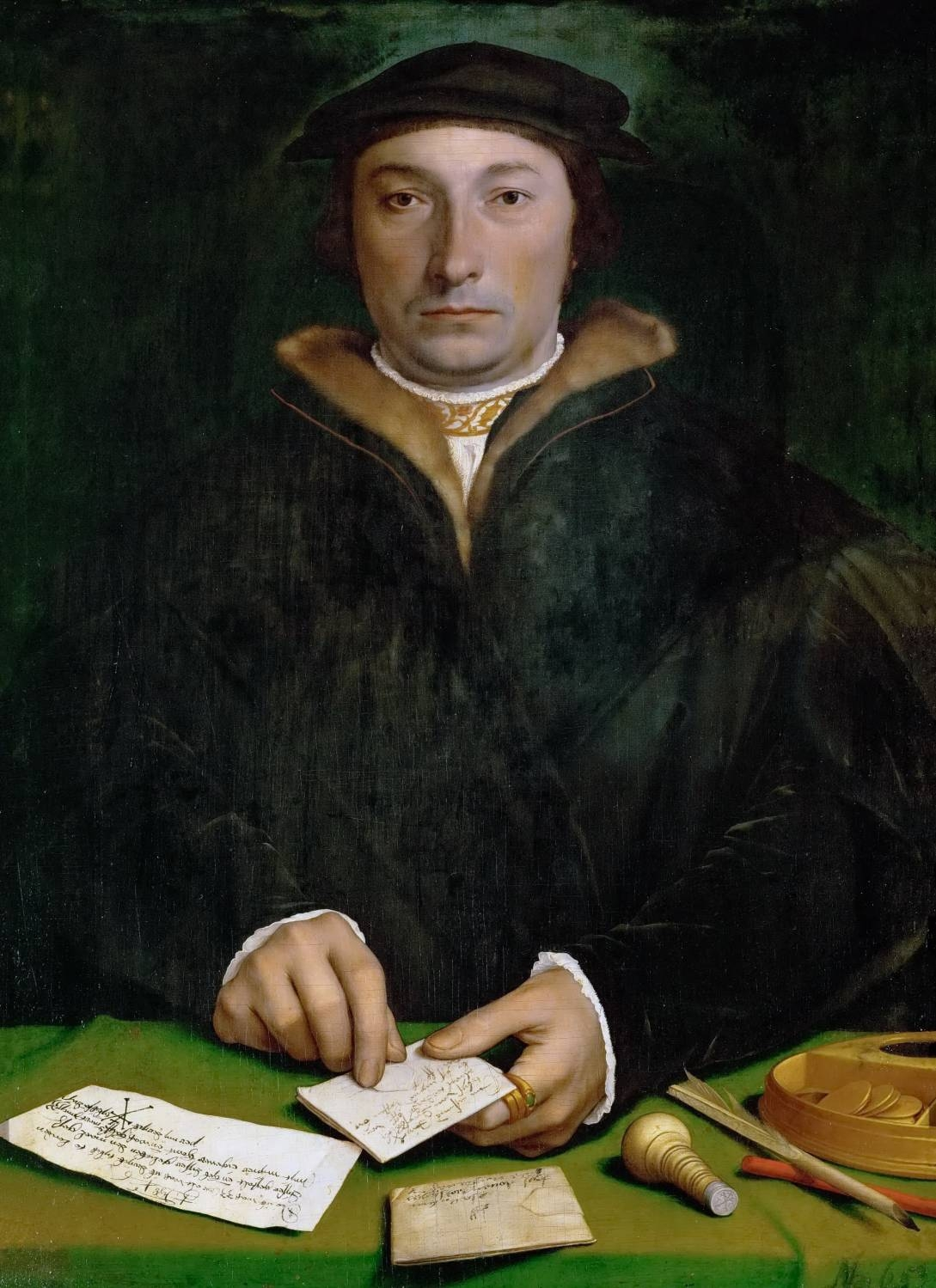
Dirk Tybis of Duisburg; 1533

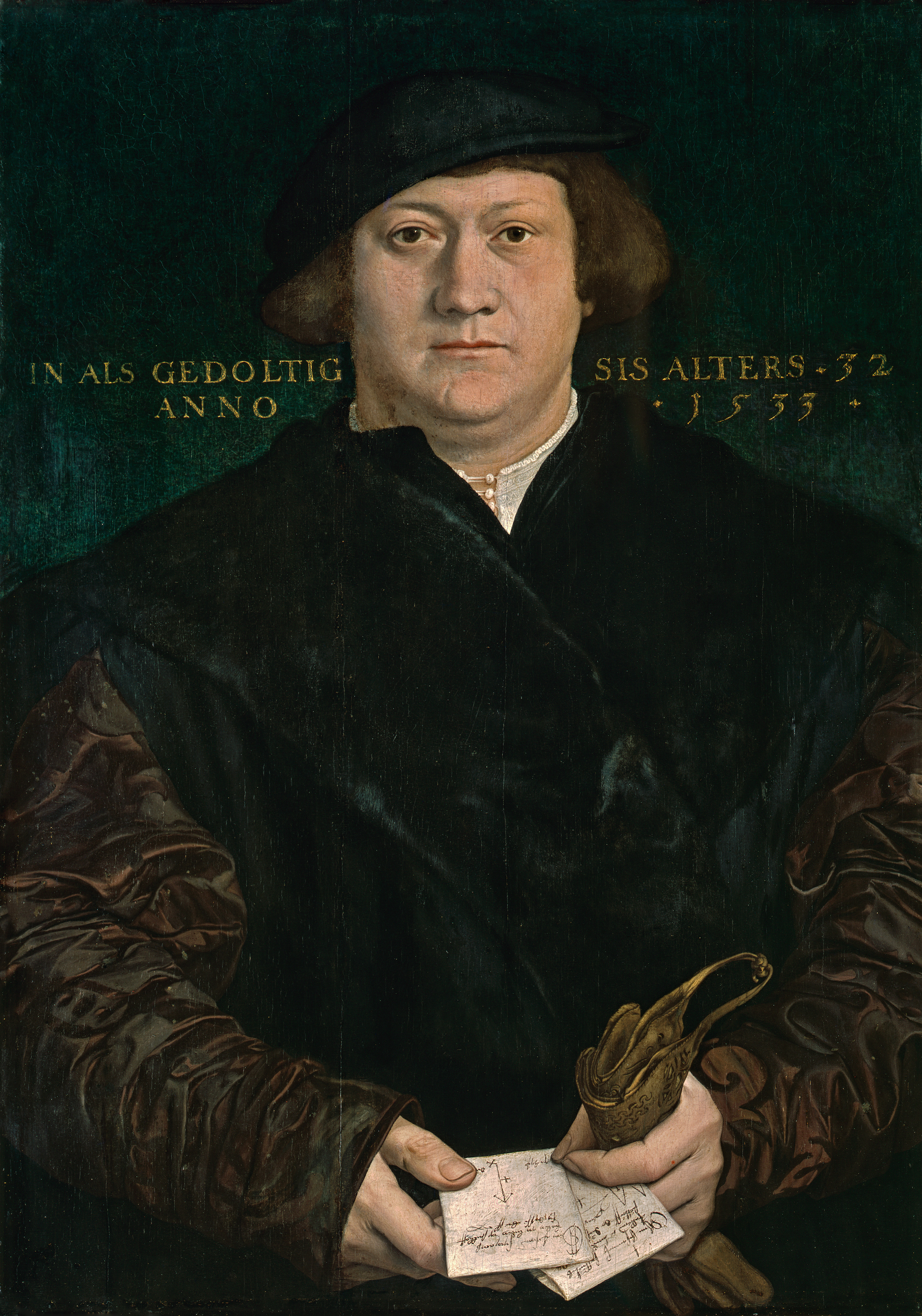
Cyriacus Kale 1533

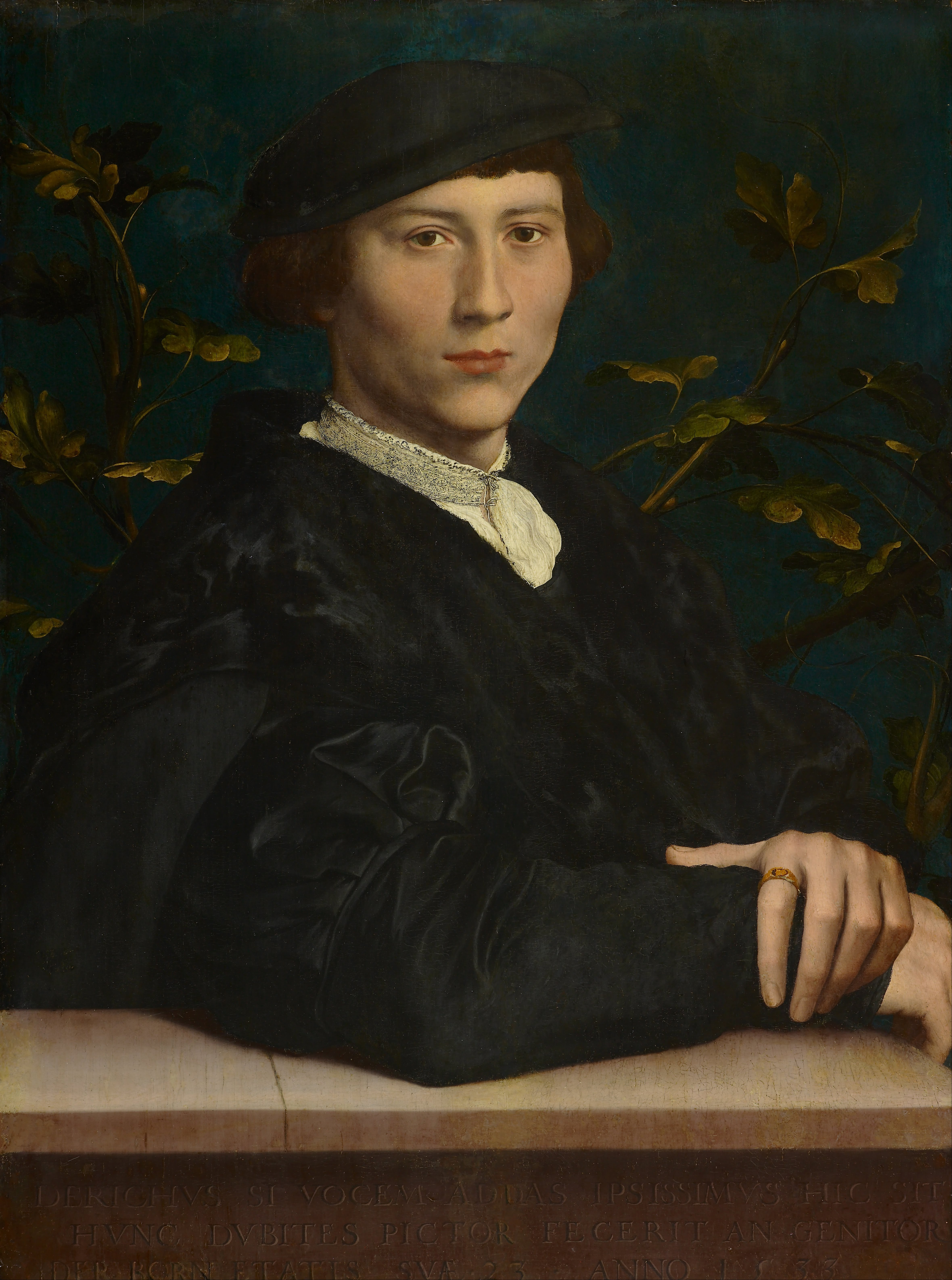
Derick Born (1533);

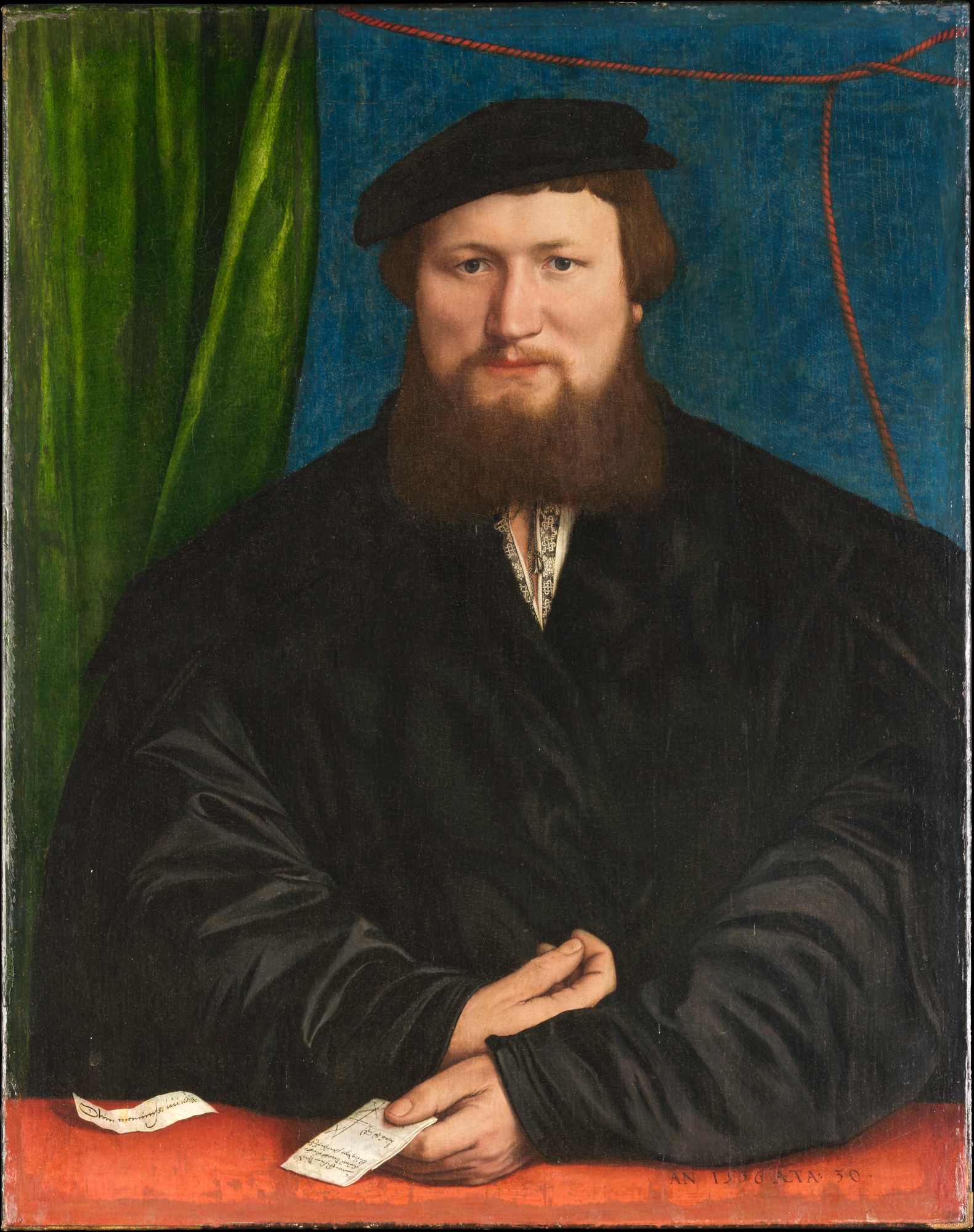
Derick Berck (painted in 1536)
