= Alastair Dunnett =

Scottish journalist and newspaper editor

- Born: Alastair MacTavish Dunnett; 26 December 1908; Kilmacolm, Renfrewshire, Scotland
- Died: 2 September 1998 (aged 89); Edinburgh, Scotland
- Education: Hillhead High School to age 15
- Known for: Journalist and Newspaper editor
- Spouse: Dorothy Dunnett née Halliday (m. 1946)
- Children: 2

Sir Alastair MacTavish Dunnett (26 December 1908 – 2 September 1998) was a Scottish journalist and newspaper editor. He edited The Daily Record newspaper for nine years and The Scotsman newspaper from 1956 to 1972. In 1975 he became chairman of Thomson Scottish Petroleum and was much involved in the establishment of the oil terminal at Flotta in Orkney. From the 1950s to the 1980s he was involved in many Scottish cultural activities including being governor of the Pitlochry Festival Theatre (1958–1984). He was awarded an honorary degree of LLD by the University of Strathclyde in 1978 and was knighted on 4 July 1995.

Between the Wars, Dunnett was active in the Scouts and outdoor pursuits. In 1933, with Seamus Adam, he launched Claymore, a weekly magazine for Scottish boys which ran for 31 issues until the summer of 1934.

He published a book of short stories (Heard tell, 1947), a description of a kayaking voyage round the coast of Scotland (Quest by canoe, 1950, republished in 1969 as It's too late in the year and in 1996 as The canoe boys), several books on Scottish topics and an autobiography (Among friends, 1984).

Dunnett married Dorothy Halliday on 17 September 1946; as Dorothy Dunnett she was a celebrated artist and historical novelist, author of the Lymond Chronicles and The House of Niccolo. They had two sons, Ninian and Mungo.

== Bibliography ==
- as Sinclair, Duncan (1935). Treasure at Sonnach. Edinburgh: Nelson.
- Dunnett, Alastair (1947). Heard Tell. Edinburgh: Albyn Press.
- Dunnett, Alastair (1950). Quest by canoe: Glasgow to Skye. London: G. Bell.
- Dunnett, Alastair (1953). Land of Scotch being an account of the topography and history of Scotland with some mention of the products of that country. Edinburgh: A. Brown & sons for the Scotch Whisky Association.
  - Republished as: Dunnett, Alastair (1969). It's too late in the year, etc. Portway reprints. Bath: Cedric Chivers.
  - Republished as: Dunnett, Alastair (1995). The Canoe Boys: from the Clyde past the Cuillins. Glasgow: Neil Wilson. ISBN 1-897784-42-2.
- Dunnett, Alastair (1960). The Donaldson Line: a century of shipping, 1854-1954. Glasgow: Jackson.
- Dunnett, Alastair, ed. (1972). Alistair MacLean introduces Scotland. London: Deutsch. ISBN 0-233-96349-9.
- Dunnett, Alastair (1978). No thanks to the Duke. London: Cape. ISBN 0-224-01630-X.
- Dunnett, Alastair (1984). Among friends: an autobiography. London: Century books. ISBN 0-7126-0932-6.
- Dunnett, Dorothy; Alastair Dunnett (1988). The Scottish Highlands. Edinburgh: Mainstream. ISBN 1-85158-149-9.

== Sources ==
- Linklater, Magnus (May 2005). "Alastair Dunnett". Oxford Dictionary of National Biography. doi:10.1093/ref:odnb/70893.

Media offices
Preceded by John Buchanan	Editor of The Scotsman; 1956–1972	Succeeded by Eric MacKay
