= Treaty of Utrecht (disambiguation) =

Treaty of Utrecht or Peace of Utrecht is a group of treaties in 1713 that ended the War of the Spanish Succession.

Treaty of Utrecht may also refer to:

- Treaty of Utrecht (1474), a treaty that ended the Anglo-Hanseatic War
- Union of Utrecht (1579), a treaty that unified the northern provinces of the Netherlands
- Union of Utrecht, a federation of Old Catholic churches, nationally organised from 1870 schisms which rejected Roman Catholic doctrines of the First Vatican Council;
