= Portrait of Hermann Hillebrandt de Wedigh =

Painting by Hans Holbein the Younger

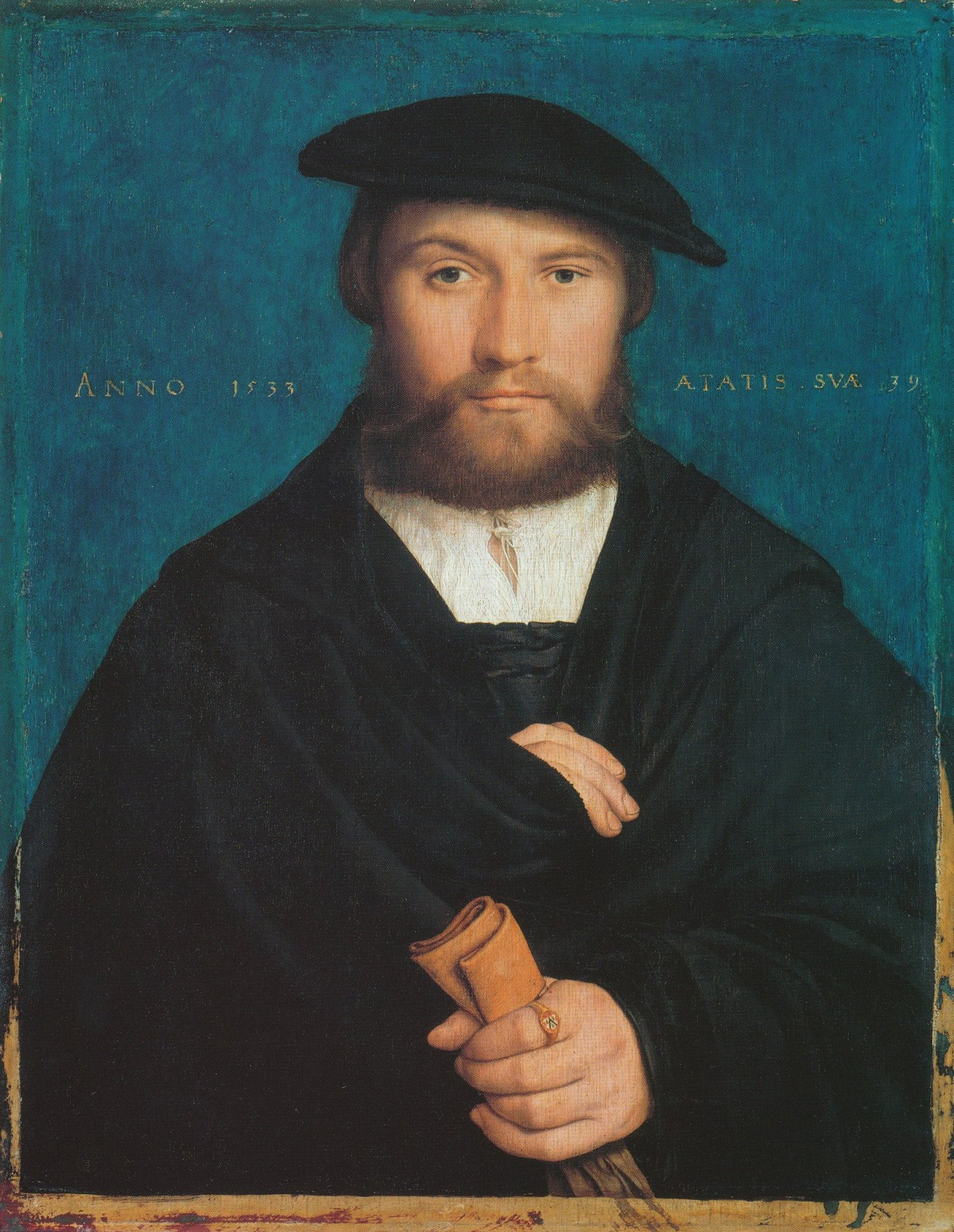
- Artist: Hans Holbein the Younger
- Year: 1533
- Medium: oil and tempera on oak
- Dimensions: 42.1 cm × 32.6 cm (16.6 in × 12.8 in)
- Location: Gemäldegalerie, Berlin, Germany
- Accession: 586B
- Website: www.smb.museum/en/museums-institutions/gemaeldegalerie/home/

Portrait of Hermann Hillebrandt de Wedigh is an oil and tempera on oak painting completed in 1533 by Hans Holbein the Younger, now in the Gemäldegalerie, Berlin. It depicts a member of the Wedigh family of Cologne thought to be a merchant of the Steelyard in London.

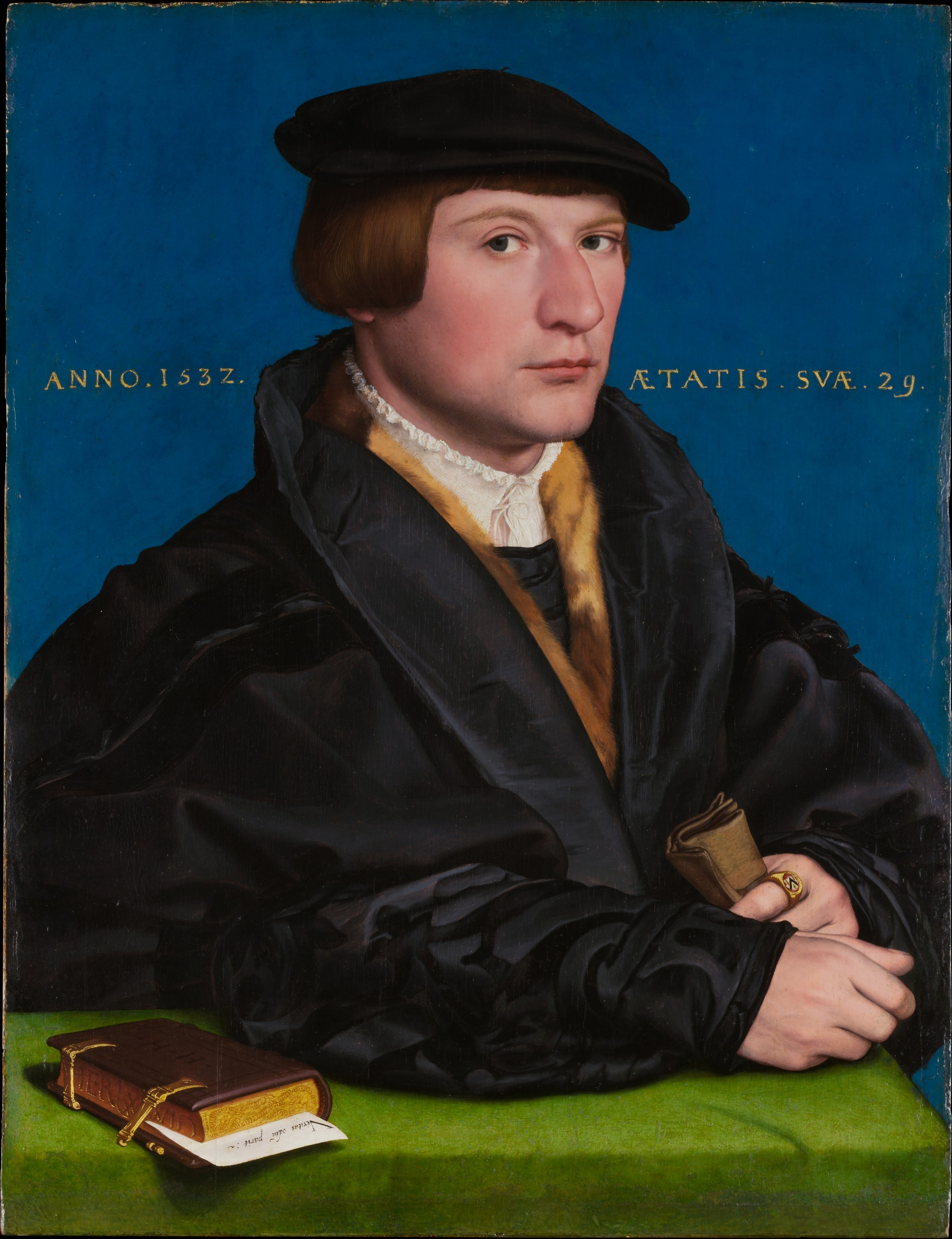
Hermann von Wedigh III (died 1560), 1532, by Hans Holbein the Younger, Metropolitan Museum of Art, New York

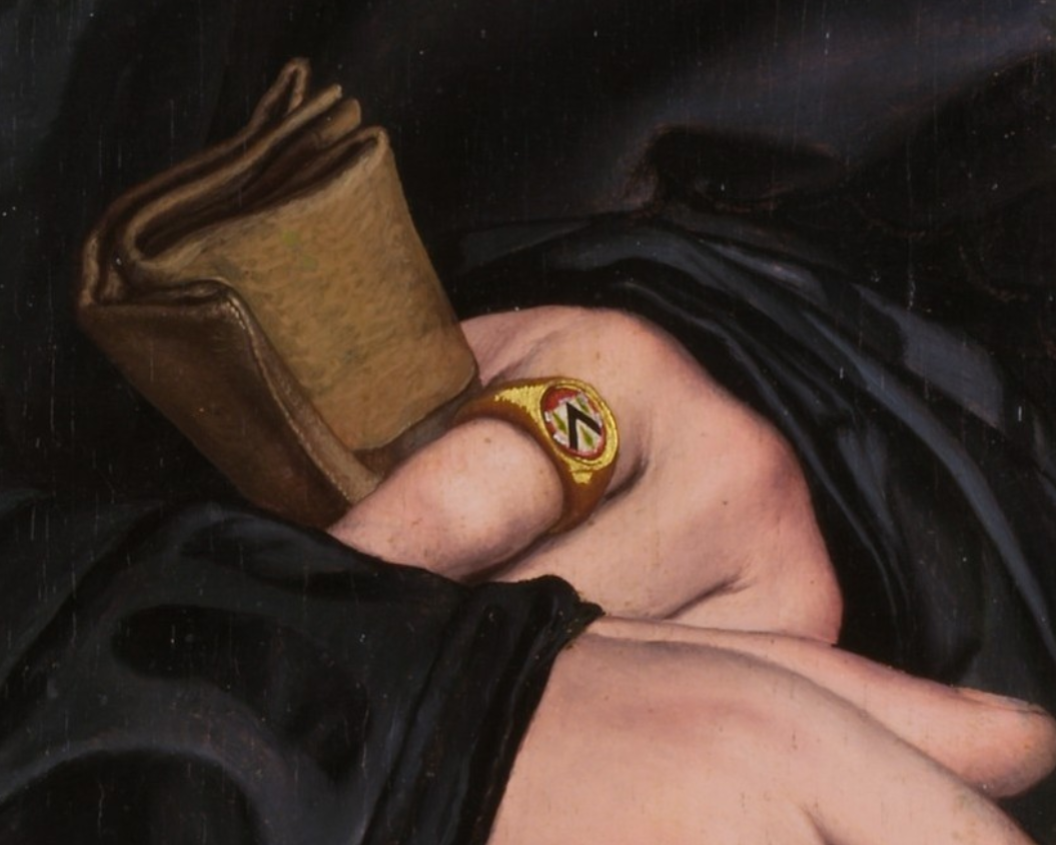
Hermann von Wedigh III (died 1560), Detail

== Description ==
This small half-length has been described as "one of the finest and most sympathetic portraits ever painted by Holbein." The subject stands directly facing the viewer, the left hand holding his buff-coloured gloves, and the right half hidden by the heavy dark-brown cloak. The manner in which the right hand is hidden inside a cloak is repeated in The poet Henry Howard, Earl of Surrey (c. 1542). This cloak the folds of which are finely arranged and painted, has a black velvet collar and velvet at the wrists. The white shirt, partly open and showing the bare chest beneath, is tied in the front by long strings passed through a white button, and the embroidered collar is almost hidden by his beard. A flat black cap is on his head, of the type worn by all the Steelyard merchants in Holbein's portraits. The hair, beard, and moustache are light brown, "the separate hairs being indicated with almost microscopic care." The eyes are blue, the right one larger than the left, the eyebrow raised. The right side of the face shows "great charm and much sweetness of expression" and the left appears "sadder and more forbidding".

On the plain blue background there is a Latin inscription at head-height, with the year and the sitter's age in gold letters: ANNO . 1533. // ÆTATIS SVÆ . 39. The signet ring on his index finger is enamelled in red, white, black and green, and in the circle around a coat of arms there are some letters now undecipherable. Unlike Holbein's other paintings of Steelyard merchants, this portrait and that of Derich Born (1533), have no letter/s or merchant's mark to identify the sitter.

A related portrait, Hermann von Wedigh III (died 1560) (1532), now at the Metropolitan Museum of Art in New York also has a raised eyebrow over the right eye which is larger than the left and the same coat of arms on a signet ring. "Perhaps to engage the viewer in close study of the likenesses of the two men, or even to stress a common family trait, the artist has exaggerated the size of the right eye in each."

The two men have been identified as a members of the Wedigh family of Cologne by the coat of arms on their signet ring: a chevron surrounded by three willow leaves. Maximilian I granted this coat of arms to a "Rheinlander" named Heinrich von Wedigh (1440–1513) on 18 July 1503. Several members of this patrician family were merchants at the Steelyard in London from 1480.

== Identification ==
The subject of this painting may be an undocumented brother or cousin of Hermann III von Wedigh. He is traditionally called "Hermann Hillebrandt Wedigh," but only his family name and age can be established. Hermann III von Wedigh's father, Hermann II, had, so far as we know, no other sons and no brothers, and although his sister Clara married first Philip Aberlinck and then Johannes Hillebrandt, no children are recorded from either marriage. The identification of this member of the family as "Hermann Hillebrandt Wedigh" is by no means certain.

== Provenance ==
The Counts von Schönborn, Vienna, by 1746 until 1865; the banker, Barthold Suermondt, Aachen, until 1874.

== See also ==
- List of paintings by Hans Holbein the Younger
