= Anglo-Hanseatic War =

15th-century European conflict

Date	1469–1474
Location	English Channel
Result	Hanseatic victory

Belligerents
Kingdom of England	Hanseatic League

Commanders and leaders
Edward IV	Paul Beneke

The Anglo-Hanseatic War was a conflict fought between England and the Hanseatic League, led by the cities of Danzig and Lübeck, that lasted from 1469 to 1474. Causes of the war include increasing English pressure against the trade of the Hanseatic cities on the southern coast of the Baltic Sea. The war was concluded by the 1474 Treaty of Utrecht.

== Background ==
In the 15th century, English merchants competed with the Hanseatic League to control the wool and cloth trade in England and with the Baltic cities. They urged the Crown to acknowledge their rights to participate in the Baltic trade and in 1447 King Henry VI finally revoked all Hansa privileges. Several Lübeck and Danzig vessels were captured by English privateers in May 1449. After long and difficult negotiations, an eight-years armistice was agreed in 1456.

However, in 1459 English privateers started to move against Hansa shipping again. Peace talks at Hamburg failed in 1465, in particular since Henry VI refused to issue compensation and the Hanseatic cities disagreed about their negotiation line. Tensions increased when in 1468 Danzig privateers, chartered by the Danish Crown, seized several English merchant vessels passing the Sound. King Edward IV in turn had the Hanseatic Steelyard trading base in London foreclosed and seized the next year. The representatives of the Hanse cities met at Lübeck and decided to go to war. English wool imports were banned and privateers were ordered to raid English sealinks.

The importance of the wool trade from England to the continent by Hanseatic merchants can be seen in the economic outputs, and their subsequent decline in the period noted below during the war, which is denoted as 1471–1475. The economic damage done by the war was one of the main reasons why it came to an abrupt end.

Export of English cloth by Hanseatic merchants
Date	Length of cloth	Date	Length of cloth
1366–1368	1690	1456–1460	10176
1377–1380	2028	1461–1465	8734
1392–1395	7827	1465–1470	5733
1399–1401	6737	1481–1482	15070
1401–1405	5940	1476–1480	9820
1406–1410	6160	1481–1482	15070
1411–1415	4990	1510–1514	21607
1416–1420	5686	1515–1520	20400
1421–1425	7238	1521–1525	18503
1426–1430	4495	1526–1530	20372
1431–1435	4016	1531–1535	24266
1436–1440	9044	1536–1540	30740
1441–1445	11480	1541–1545	27329
1446–1450	9292	Jan–Sep 1545	27903
1451–1455	7682		

== Course ==
Danzig and, to a lesser extent, Lübeck forces carried the main burden, supported by the cities of Hamburg and Bremen. The city of Cologne opposed the war and was temporarily excluded from the Hansa for this. As the Burgundian duke Charles the Bold cancelled his commitment to open his harbours, the Hanseatic privateers had to wait for departure until spring 1470. The rule of the English king, on the other hand, was weakened by the dynastic Wars of the Roses and in September Edward IV even had to flee to the Burgundian County of Flanders. Duke Charles backed Edward's return to England and now opened his harbours providing the Hansa forces to capture several vessels of the king's enemies. Upon the restoration of the English king, Charles again withdrew his support immediately.

From 1472 onwards, the Hansa forces were able to operate in the English Channel up to Ushant island with larger formations, led by Lübeck and Hamburg squadrons, and their advance even called up a French fleet. The war was fought mainly by the use of the naval strategy of commerce raiding. One of the most successful man of war ships was the Peter von Danzig under Paul Beneke, which from 1473 raided the English coast and did not spare neutral ships nor vessels flying Burgundian flags.

The war concluded with the Treaty of Utrecht in 1474 which confirmed the Hansa privileges and granted the League ownership of the London Steelyard, as well as the trading bases in Boston and Lynn. It virtually halted English trade with Germany and the Baltic region.
