= Dorothy Dunnett Society =

Charity

The Dorothy Dunnett Society is a charity set up by Dorothy Dunnett in 2001. It was originally called the Dorothy Dunnett Readers' Association. It is a Charity regulated under Scottish law and has the following aims:

- To seek to advance the education of the public concerning the history, politics, culture and religion of the 11th, 15th and 16th centuries by promoting the study of and research into such subjects generally and into such subjects particularly as they relate to the works of Dorothy Dunnett and to disseminate to the public the results of such research.
- To seek to foster the appreciation and recognition of the literary works of Dorothy Dunnett.
- To seek to ensure that the manuscripts, letters, reference materials and research papers of Dorothy Dunnett are preserved and are accessible.

== Activities ==
In furtherance of these aims, the Society undertakes activities in the following area:

=== Publications and communications ===
- The magazine Whispering Gallery is published by the Society each quarter for circulation to members and other interested parties;
- Publishes a series of Dorothy Dunnett Guides to various locations. The first of these was Bruges: A Dorothy Dunnett Guide. The second in the series, on Iceland, was published in the second half of 2013, and the guide on Edinburgh was published in 2021. Guides on Russia, Istanbul and Scotland are also available.
- Maintains Dunettpedia - the Dorothy Dunnett Wiki, a work in progress, founded in 2013;
- Maintains DunnettCentral, the Society Web Page, which contains public information, and a private members' area called The Solar.
- Maintains a presence on Facebook and Twitter.
- Encourages members to communicate using Social media, include the Marzipan email Yahoo group.

=== Seminars, conferences and visits ===
- Holds seminars and conferences for members and other interested parties to share knowledge and opinions of the works of Dorothy Dunnett and related subjects, and encourages its members to hold them.
- The Dorothy Dunnett Society annual conference is known as the Dunnett Edinburgh Weekend. It includes Seminars, visits to place of historic interest, and the Society's Annual General Meeting.
- The Society organises the annual International Dorothy Dunnett Day to facilitate members and other Dunnett Readers meeting up in various locations. The first of these was held on 15 October 2011 to celebrate 50 years of publication of Dorothy Dunnett's first novel 'The Game of Kings', and the next will be on 9 November 2013);
- The Society arranges for occasional Literary Lunches (the first in 2009, the second in 2012);
- Other events are held by members on an occasional basis, e.g. the 2013 Harrogate Gathering, the 2013 Dunnett Confluence of Pittsburgh, the 2012 Dunnett Siege of Constantinople, and a number of other such events over the years.

=== Prizes and bursaries ===
Gives literary prizes and bursaries to encourage study and research into the periods about which Dorothy Dunnett wrote - most notably

- the Dorothy Dunnett Prize, organised in association with the University of Edinburgh Centre for Medieval and Renaissance Studies to encourage university-level interest in history;
- the James Gillespie Dunnett Prize which is awarded occasionally.

=== Merchandise ===
- The society produces merchandise, e.g. Mugs, Brooches, Calendars, that are for sale via its website.

=== Dunnett Archive ===
- The Society worked with the National Library of Scotland to catalogue the Dunnett Archive - the primary collection of Dorothy Dunnett's literary papers.

=== Grants ===
- The Society occasionally makes small grants to other organisations (e.g. to preserve books in Timbuktu, to the National Library of Scotland and to Traquair House).

== Memorial stone ==
In 2006, the Dorothy Dunnett Society arranged for a memorial stone to be laid in the memory of Dorothy Dunnett in the Makars' Court by the entrance to the Scottish Writer's Museum at Lady Stair's Close on Edinburgh's Royal Mile. The unveiling ceremony was attended by Dorothy Dunnett's son, Mungo Dunnett and his family, the Lord Provost of Edinburgh, the Edinburgh Makar (Valerie Gillies), and the Ross Herald (Charles Burnett) as well as members of the Society and others. The stone contains Lady Dunnett's coat of arms, and a short quote from one of her books "Where are the links in the chain ... joining us to the past".

== Membership ==
The Society has members in England, Scotland, Wales, Ireland, France, Germany, Spain, Canada, the United States, Australia, New Zealand and other countries around the world.

== Regulation ==
The Society is regulated by the Office of the Scottish Charity Regulator and its Charitable reference number is SC030649.
