= Paul Beneke =

German admiral and city councilor

Paul Beneke, also Paul Benecke, (early 1400s (decade) – c. 1480) was a German town councillor of Danzig and a privateer who was associated with the Hanseatic League.

== Life ==
During the Anglo-Hanseatic War, Beneke overpowered an English fleet at Zween in 1468. When Beneke was commissioned by Lübeck, head of the Hanseatic League, to captain the ship Peter von Danzig, he chose to become part owner instead of taking pay. In 1473 in the North Sea, he followed and boarded the galley St. Matthew, which had a registered owner's name of Tommaso Portinari, but was actually owned by England. It was bound for Italy. Beneke seized, amongst other items, Hans Memling's triptych The Last Judgment. The painting had been commissioned for the chapel of a branch manager of the Medici Bank, Angelo Tani, and included a head portrait of Portinari.

Not surprisingly, the owners objected to the seizure and the issue was taken up in the papal court. Danzig defended Beneke on the basis that the seizure was a legitimate act of war as the Hanseatic League was at war with England at the time. The painting was never returned. Instead, it was donated by three Danzig patricians, Sidinghusen, Balandt and Niederhof, to the St. George Brothers church in Danzig, whence it came to Danzig's St. Mary's Church. The Burgundian Duke, under whose flag the St. Thomas had run, brokered a peace between war-weary England and the Hanseatic League, restoring their trading rights.

Paul Beneke had a wife named Margreta, and a daughter, Elsbeth.

== In popular culture ==
He is one of the historical characters who appear in Dorothy Dunnett's novels To Lie With Lions and Caprice and Rondo in the House of Niccolò series.

There is extensive coverage of Paul Beneke in Gunter Grass' The Tin Drum, in the Niobe chapter

He is also featured as an enemy pirate in the video game Patrician III.

== Sources ==
- Paul Beneke from Hanse City Danzig in service for Luebeck, capital of Hanse cities
- Mierzejewski, Marcin (1999-03-28). "Golden Goals". The Warsaw Voice.
