= Dorothy Dunnett =

Scottish historical novelist (1923–2001)

Dorothy, Lady Dunnett OBE, FRSA
- Born: Dorothy Halliday; 25 August 1923; Dunfermline, Scotland
- Died: 9 November 2001 (aged 78); Edinburgh, Scotland
- Occupation: Novelist
- Spouse: Sir Alastair Dunnett (m. 1946)
- Children: 2
- Writing career
- Period: 1961–2000
- Genres: historical fiction, mystery
- Notable works: Lymond Chronicles, House of Niccolò, Johnson Johnson series, King Hereafter

Dorothy, Lady Dunnett OBE FRSA (née Halliday, 25 August 1923 – 9 November 2001) was a Scottish novelist best known for her historical fiction. Dunnett is most famous for her six novel series set during the 16th century, which concern the fictitious adventurer Francis Crawford of Lymond. This was followed by the eight novel prequel series The House of Niccolò. Her other works include a novel concerning the historical Macbeth, King of Scotland called King Hereafter (1982), and a series of mystery novels centred upon Johnson Johnson, a portrait painter and spy.

== Life and work ==
Dunnett was born in Dunfermline, Scotland. Her father was a mining engineer and the family moved to Edinburgh when she was three. Dunnett was educated at James Gillespie's High School for Girls in Edinburgh.

Dunnett started her career as a press officer in the civil service, where she met her husband, then Chief Press Officer to the Secretary of State for Scotland.

A leading light in the Scottish arts world and a renaissance woman, Dunnett was a professional portrait painter and exhibited at the Royal Scottish Academy. She had portraits commissioned by a number of prominent public figures in Scotland. She had a keen interest in opera, was a trustee of the National Library of Scotland, a board member of the Edinburgh International Book Festival, a trustee of the Scottish National War Memorial, and a non-executive director of Scottish Television.

In 1992, Dunnett was appointed to the Order of the British Empire for her services to literature and she was also a Fellow of the Royal Society of Arts.

Writing in The Times Literary Supplement, Alexander Fiske-Harrison reviewed Dunnett's final novel in 2000, Gemini, and through that her entire oeuvre of historical fiction: "Although Dunnett’s writing style is not the neutral prose of genre fiction and it can be opaque and hard to read, especially in the early works, at times, this works with the almost melodramatic content to produce a powerful, operatic mixture... It is neither as a literary novelist nor as a historian, but as a writer of historical fiction that Dorothy Dunnett deserves recognition... The publication of Gemini completes an ambitious literary circle."

In 2001, Dunnett founded the Dorothy Dunnett Society to promote interest in the historical periods about which she wrote and communication among her readers. Dunnett's archive was left to the National Library of Scotland and articles from it appear in Whispering Gallery, the magazine of the Dorothy Dunnett Society.

Dorothy Dunnett was married in 1946 to Sir Alastair Dunnett, editor of The Scotsman newspaper, and appears in his autobiography, Among Friends, 1984. By virtue of his knighthood in 1995, she became Lady Dunnett. She died in Edinburgh in November 2001, aged 78, and was survived by her sons Ninian Dunnett and Mungo Dunnett and her grandchildren.

== Historical fiction ==
=== Lymond Chronicles ===
The manuscript for the first book in the Lymond Chronicles, The Game of Kings, was rejected by five British publishers before being published by U.S. publisher Putnam in 1961. It was written in response to Dunnett's husband's suggestion that she write something herself, when she complained of having run out of reading material.

The Lymond Chronicles is a series of six novels, set in mid-sixteenth-century Europe and the Mediterranean, which follows the life and career of a Scottish nobleman, Francis Crawford of Lymond, from 1547 through 1558. Meticulously researched, the series takes place in a wide variety of locations, including France, the Ottoman Empire, Malta, England, Scotland and Russia. In addition to a cast of original characters, the novels feature many historical figures, often in important roles, such as Margaret Douglas, Countess of Lennox, Mary, Queen of Scots, Mary of Guise, Walter Scott of Branxholme and Buccleuch, and Suleiman the Magnificent. The text also includes some French, Spanish text and Latin and classical allusions.

American writer Cecelia Holland wrote that The Game of Kings, the first novel in Dunnett’s The Lymond Chronicles, was "a “masterpiece of historical fiction, a pyrotechnic blend of passionate scholarship and high-speed storytelling soaked with the scents and colors and sounds and combustible emotions of the 16th century feudal Scotland that is its ultimate hero."

In 2014, Francis Crawford of Lymond was voted as the most popular character from a Scottish book in a survey conducted by the Scottish Book Trust.

=== The House of Niccolò ===
The House of Niccolò is a series of eight historical novels set in the late-fifteenth-century European Renaissance. Niccolo Rising, the first book of the series, was published in 1986, and the last, Gemini in 2000. The protagonist of the series is Nicholas de Fleury (Niccolò, Nicholas van der Poele, or Claes), a talented boy of uncertain birth who rises to the heights of European merchant banking and international political intrigue. The series shares most of the locations in Dunnett's earlier series, the Lymond Chronicles, but it extends much further geographically to take in the important urban centres of Bruges, Venice, Florence, Geneva, and the Hanseatic League; Burgundy, Flanders, and Poland; Iceland; the Iberian Peninsula and Madeira; the Black Sea cities of Trebizond and Caffa; Persia; the Mediterranean islands of Cyprus and Rhodes; Egypt and the Sinai Peninsula; and West Africa and the city of Timbuktu. Nicholas's progress is intertwined with such historical characters as Anselm Adornes, James III of Scotland and James II of Cyprus.

As with the Lymond Chronicles, the series features a number of historical persons, many as important characters. Both the historical and fictional characters are, however, taken from a wider variety of occupations and social classes than in the Lymond Chronicles. There are significant differences in narrative approach and writing style between the series, reflecting in part the very different personal journey taken by the central character in each.

=== King Hereafter ===
King Hereafter (1982), her long novel set in Orkney and Scotland in the years just before the invasion of England by William the Conqueror, was in Dorothy Dunnett's eyes her masterpiece. It is about an Earl of Orkney uniting the people of Alba (Scotland) and becoming its king, and is based on the author's premise that the central character Thorfinn, Earl of Orkney and the historical Macbeth, King of Scotland, were one and the same person (Thorfinn is his birth name and Macbeth his baptismal name).

=== The Dorothy Dunnett Companion and Companion II ===
Dunnett assisted in the compilation of The Dorothy Dunnett Companion (1994) and The Dorothy Dunnett Companion II (2002), which were written by Elspeth Morrison. These books provide background information to historical characters and events featured in the Lymond Chronicles and The House of Niccolò, as well as explanations of the classical allusions and literary and other quotations used in the two series, notes to sources of these citations, and many maps. The second volume, which was written after the Niccolò series was completed, contains a bibliography of many of the hundreds of primary and secondary sources Dunnett used in her historical research. Dunnett contributed more to the second volume than the first and wrote many of the entries.

== The Johnson Johnson series ==
This series of mystery thrillers was written over a long period, starting when she was writing the Lymond Chronicles. The final entry was published prior to the first House of Niccolò book.

== Other works ==
=== "The Proving Climb" ===
A contemporary short story, "The Proving Climb", set on the Scottish Isle of St. Kilda, was published in the 1973 anthology Scottish Short Stories (Scottish Arts Council, published by Collins, ISBN 0-00-221851-8). It was republished by the Dorothy Dunnett Society and distributed to its members in 2008 with issue 100 of Whispering Gallery.

=== The Lymond Poetry ===
The Lymond Poetry contains her versions and translations of some of the poems that appeared in The Lymond Chronicles. This was finalised after her death by Elspeth Morrison and edited by Richenda Todd (ISBN 978-0141012445 published in 2003 by Penguin).

=== The Scottish Highlands ===
In collaboration with her husband, Alastair Dunnett, she wrote the text for the photography book The Scottish Highlands (Photographs: David Patterson), published in 1988.

== Adaptations ==
In December 2016, it was announced that the rights to the Lymond Chronicles had been obtained by Mammoth Screen with a view to making a TV series.

== Additional information ==
=== Dorothy Dunnett Society ===
Dorothy Dunnett founded the Dorothy Dunnett Society. Membership of this registered charity is open to all Dunnett readers, and aims to promote interest in the periods of history about which Dunnett wrote, to preserve her writings, and to promote appreciation of the literary merit of her works. It also encourages discussion and meetings between readers. Prior to 1 September 2011, the Society was known as the Dorothy Dunnett Readers' Association.

=== Memorial ===
On 22 April 2006, a memorial stone to Lady Dunnett was laid by her grandchildren, Hal and Bella Dunnett, alongside those for Robert Louis Stevenson, Robert Burns and Sir Walter Scott in the Makars' Court in Lady Stair's Close on the Royal Mile in Edinburgh. The Lord Provost of Edinburgh was in attendance, and gave a speech, as did the Edinburgh Makar (Valerie Gillies), and the Ross Herald (Charles Burnett). The initiative to lay the stone, and the main funding for it, came from the members of the Dorothy Dunnett Society. The Stone contains Dorothy Dunnett's name, her coat of arms, and a brief quote from one of her books "Where are the links of the chain ... joining us to the past".

=== Edinburgh home ===
Dunnett's long-term home at 87 Colinton Road, Edinburgh was at an Edwardian era semi-detached villa in the Merchiston area, designed by Edward Calvert.

=== Gatherings ===
Dorothy Dunnett readers are devoted and active, and have held gatherings in Edinburgh in 1990, 1994, and in 2000 with over 300 people in attendance. Similar events were held in Boston, and in Philadelphia in 2000. Since her death smaller international gatherings of between 50 and 115 people have been held in Dublin (November 2001), New Orleans (November 2003), Malta (October 2005), Saddell in South West Scotland (April 2007), Orkney (September 2007), and Paris (2010).A gathering, 'The Dunnett Siege of Constantinople', took place in Istanbul in September 2012. Places visited by the 115 Siegers focused on Pawn in Frankincense and also on John Grant in the Niccolὸ series, in which historical character John Grant had taken part in the 1453 Siege of Constantinople, this was followed by the 'Dunnett Carnival of Venice' in Venice in 2016 focusing primarily on the 'House of Niccolò'.

There are several meetings of readers in the UK each year, in locations such as Oxford, Bath, London, York, Warwick, Harrogate and Stamford. Also the formal Annual General Meeting (AGM) of the Dorothy Dunnett Society is held each spring in Edinburgh as part of its Dorothy Dunnett Weekend.

Occasional meetings are held in Australia and Canada, as well, with one SworDDplay held in Vancouver in April 2006 and another in Alexandria, Virginia in the United States in March 2008 and the Dunnett Confluence of Pittsburgh took place in Pennsylvania in October 2013. Smaller meetings also occur locally in several other countries, such as Germany (notably the annual meeting in Darmstadt) and Italy. Readers also get together more informally to go on holiday to various Dunnett locations. In 2007, some readers visited Timbuktu, Mali, and others Venice, Italy.

=== International Dorothy Dunnett Day (IDDD) ===
In 2011, the first International Dorothy Dunnett Day was announced by the Dorothy Dunnett Society to celebrate the 50th anniversary of the publication of The Game of Kings. It was held on Saturday 15 October 2011, with readers gathering in locations around the world at 13:00 (1pm) local time to toast the author. Meetings were held in Edinburgh, London, Vancouver, San Francisco, the Costa Del Sol, Boston, and other locations. The second IDDD was held on Saturday 10 November 2012, to commemorate the 11th anniversary of the death of Dorothy Dunnett on 9 November 2001. The last pre-COVID-19 event was held on 9 November 2019.

== The Dorothy Dunnett Centenary Awards ==
In 2023, the Dorothy Dunnett Society and the University of the Highlands and Islands launched the Dorothy Dunnett Centenary Awards in memory of Dunnett.
