= Treaty of Utrecht (1474) =

Treaty following the Anglo-Hanseatic war

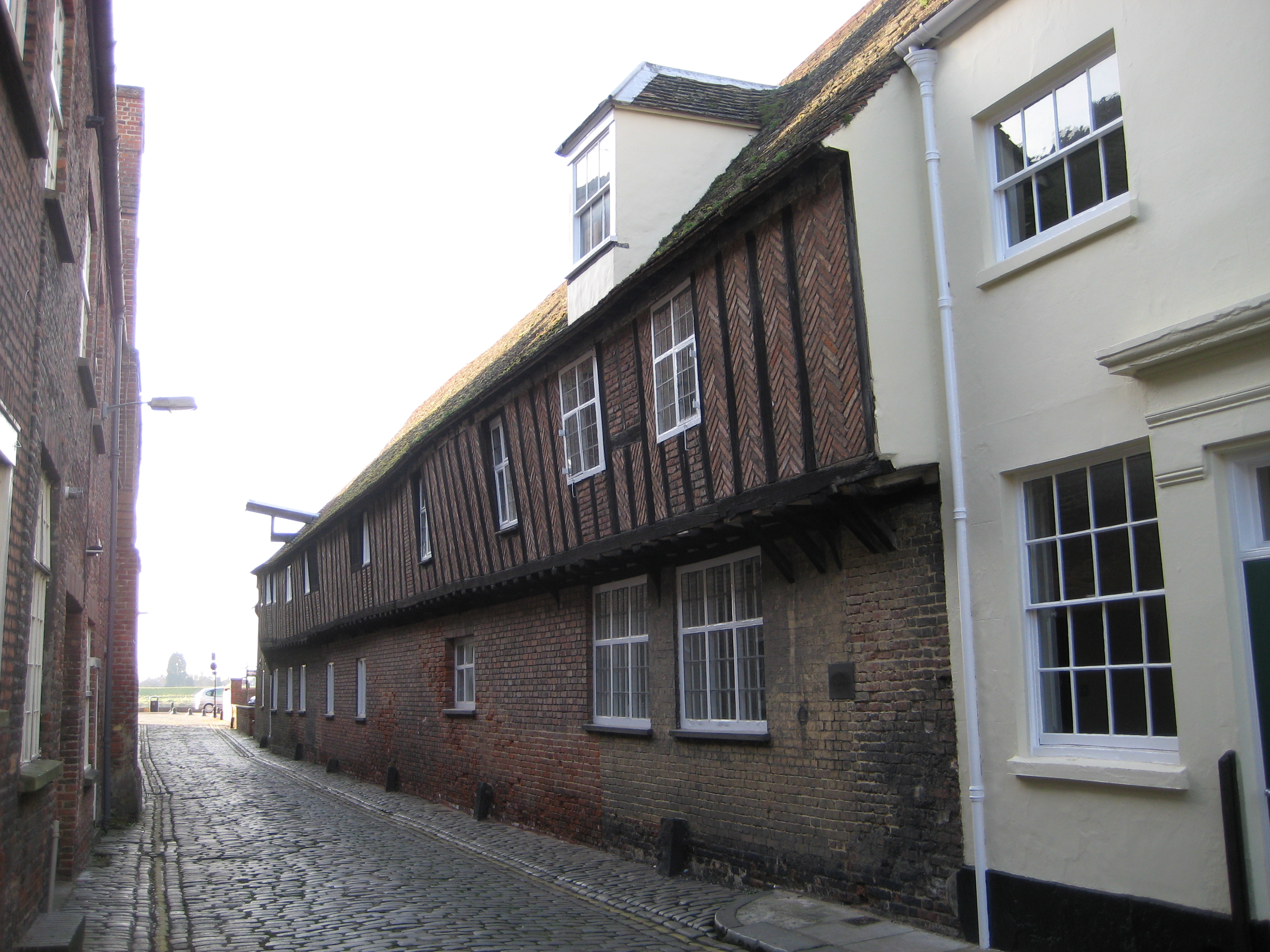
Hanseatic Warehouse in King's Lynn.

The Treaty of Utrecht was signed in 1474 after the Anglo-Hanseatic War between England and the Hanseatic League.

This naval war had begun in 1470 using the naval strategy of commerce raiding in the North Sea and the English Channel; one of the most successful men-of-war was the Peter von Danzig. Driven in the main by the cities Danzig and Lübeck, it was a war against increasing English pressure on the trade of the Hanseatic cities of the southern coast of the Baltic sea. England was bankrupt after years of war and mismanagement; pressure against Hanseatic cities trade on the southern coast of the Baltic sea had to be foregone, while Cologne and other German cities had opposed, and were therefore temporarily excluded from, the Hansa.

The treaty declared peace between Lubeck and the German Confederation with England, restoring the Hanseatic privileges in the Port of London. These included immunity for Hanseatic franchises from the Tunnage and Poundage levy, which had been guaranteed by the Utrecht Treaty of 1437. It did not however halt the league's long-term decline across Germany, a fact the Prussians recognised during Anglo-Hanse Conference at Utrecht in 1451. The German Hansa could not prevent the Dutch penetrating into Baltic port markets. In Riga the Latvians opposed the Treaty of Utrecht, attempting to use the leaguers to prevent English trade competition with the continent. The Hansa ignored Riga's pleas and the treaty was ratified. While the Merchant Adventurers were excluded from the Baltic, because they had lost the 1468–1474 war, they remained prepared for negotiation to restore access to the Low countries. Edward IV drew up peace treaties to clear the path for war with France. In a good year as much as 50% of the Exchequer's revenues came from customs: 10% rate on cloth, but in 1470, wool taxes were as much as 48% on alien immigrants. The trade war had to come to an end.

The treaty, negotiated by Lübeck's mayor Hinrich Castorp, granted the league threatened privileges they deemed a success. The Hanseatic League regained ownership of the London Steelyard premises, which were secured this way until the middle of the 19th century as Hanseatic property in London. Londoners rioted in the streets in protest at the unfair treatment of the city's merchants.

The Hansa was guaranteed access to the ports of Hull, Lynn, and Boston and a claim on customs dues to the sum of £10,000 per annum. In the late 1470s and 80s broadcloth sales exceeded 13,000 in a period that marked a boom. The treaty was a partial defeat for the English. They yielded franchises and tax revenues in order to gain peace in Germany and trade with the Netherlands. But English trade did not penetrate Germany with confidence again until the Elizabethans. Nor did it recover in the Baltic.

The Hanseatic Warehouse in King's Lynn was constructed in 1475 as part of the Treaty of Utrecht allowing the Hansa to establish a trading depot in Lynn for the first time. It was used as such until 1751 and is the only remaining building of the Hanseatic League in England.
