= Lymond Chronicles =

Series of historical novels by Dorothy Dunnett

- The Game of Kings (1961); Queens' Play (1964); The Disorderly Knights (1966); Pawn in Frankincense (1969); The Ringed Castle (1971); Checkmate (1975)
- Author: Dorothy Dunnett
- Language: English
- Genre: Historical fiction
- Publisher: Putnam's (U.S. first ed.); Cassell (U.K. first ed.)
- Published: 1961–1975
- Media type: Print (hardcover)
- No. of books: 6
- Followed by: The House of Niccolò

The Lymond Chronicles is a series of six historical novels written by Dorothy Dunnett and first published between 1961 and 1975. Set in mid-16th-century Europe and the Mediterranean area, the series tells the story of a young Scottish nobleman, Francis Crawford of Lymond, from 1547 until 1558.

== Overview ==
=== Francis Crawford of Lymond ===
The six volumes follow the life and career of the charismatic Francis Crawford of Lymond, the younger son of the Crawfords of Culter, members of the landed aristocracy of the Scottish Lowlands. Brought up according to the Renaissance ideal of an educated autodidact, he is a polyglot, knowledgeable in literature, philosophy, mathematics and the sciences, a practitioner of all the martial arts, a spell-binding musician, a talented thespian, and a master strategist with a genius for imaginative tactics.

An intensely private man with a public persona, Lymond is a non-conformist who is suspicious of political and religious causes. He is driven by his demanding personal code of behaviour and responsibility, regardless of society's expectations or rules. Though a cosmopolitan military leader, diplomat and spy, he has an abiding feeling for his home country of Scotland. Despite his reluctance to relinquish his cherished independence and align himself permanently with any nation's ruler, Lymond's professional reputation increasingly makes him a sought-after ally, or a foe to be avoided, by many of the crowned heads of Europe. Still, only for goals he believes in strongly will he deploy his glittering and commanding persona, quicksilver mind, talent for dissembling what he thinks or feels, and rapier tongue; and once he dedicates himself to a goal, his will is implacable.

In his personal life, Lymond has an unusual ability to inspire intense loyalty and even love in those who are attracted to him. But the Crawford family's history begins to produce more and more tensions, and these conflicts are exacerbated by the family's shared weaknesses: immense pride and a stubborn refusal to explain the reasons for their actions.

As a whole, the Lymond Chronicles tell how an arrogant, brilliant, but troubled individualist, though increasingly successful professionally, becomes alienated and isolated as a result of battles with forces he can't control, as well as with himself; and how he ultimately becomes reconciled with his country, his family and friends, and himself.

=== History in the Lymond Chronicles ===
Dunnett paints on a large historical canvas, with details based on meticulous research in hundreds of primary and secondary sources. In addition to their original characters, the novels feature a large number of historical figures, often in important roles.

The historical setting is the incessant jockeying for power through treaties, alliances of convenience, political marriages, wars, and even piracy, among the English Tudors, the Holy Roman Empire of the Habsburgs, the French Valois, the Ottoman Empire of Suleiman the Magnificent, and their respective secular and religious allies, including the Stewarts of Scotland, the Knights of St. John, the corsairs of North Africa, and Tsar Ivan the Terrible of Russia. Each of the six books has several locations with the exception of the first, The Game of Kings, which takes place almost exclusively in the Scottish Lowlands and the borders with England.

The novels examine the politics and culture of each court and its nobility as monarchies centralized their power; the intensifying controversies over the Reformation; implications of the Age of Discovery for political and economic power and knowledge; and the blurred boundaries between faith and reason in religion, esoterica such as alchemy and astrology, and science. In addition, the large number of women in positions of political power during this period (as rulers in their own name, as regents, as strong wives or mistresses of kings, or as heirs to thrones) affords an exploration of women's roles.

=== Structure ===
The six books, collectively, form a single story, told in chronological order though the first two books can be read as self-contained novels. The endings of the third and fifth novels do not resolve their stories but lead directly to the story taken up in their respective sequels.

=== Relationship to other works by Dunnett ===
Dunnett viewed these works as part of a larger fourteen-volume work, with The House of Niccolò series forming the other part. The other books, written afterwards, tell of Lymond's ancestors in the previous century and allude to events in the Lymond Chronicles. Dunnett recommended readers begin with the Lymond Chronicles and then read The House of Niccolò. As with the Lymond Chronicles, The House of Niccolò features a number of historical figures as important characters. Both the historical and fictional characters are taken from a wider variety of occupations and social classes than in the Lymond Chronicles. There are significant differences in narrative approach and writing style between the series, reflecting the different journey taken by the central character in each.

== The Game of Kings (1961) ==
After five years in exile, Lymond has recently returned to Scotland, in defiance of Scottish charges against him for pro-English treason and murder. Lymond has returned with the goal of proving his innocence and restoring his name. His family, the Crawfords, have become entangled in the complex politics between England and Scotland, including the Anglo-Scottish wars, Scotland's alliance with France, and skirmishes in the Borders region.

The novel is constructed as an intricate mystery, punctuated by set pieces of adventure, high comedy, and drama. Characters such as Richard Crawford, third Baron Culter and Lymond's older brother, and Margaret Douglas, Countess of Lennox are one-time friends or intimates of Lymond's who become his mortal enemies. Betrayals and double-crosses, both potential and actual, abound. The pieces of the mystery only fit together late in the story as revelations at a trial.

Historical figures appearing in the novel include members of the Scott clan including Sir Walter Scott of Buccleuch, his wife, Janet Beaton, and his son William Scott of Kincurd, who becomes Lymond's second-in-command in his band of outlaws; Mary of Guise, the Queen Dowager of Scotland and her young daughter, Mary, Queen of Scots; and members of the Douglas family including Archibald Douglas, 6th Earl of Angus, his brother Sir George Douglas, his daughter Margaret Douglas, Countess of Lennox (niece of Henry VIII), and Margaret's husband Matthew Stewart, 4th Earl of Lennox, a potential claimant to the Scottish throne if the young Mary, Queen of Scots, died. The English military leaders responsible for prosecuting the war of The Rough Wooing, Sir William Grey and Lord Thomas Wharton, also have prominent, and often comedic, roles.

=== Main fictional characters ===
- Francis Crawford of Lymond, Master of Culter
- Sybilla Crawford, Dowager Baroness Culter
- Richard Crawford, Third Baron Culter
- Mariotta Crawford, Baroness Culter
- Christian Stewart
- Jonathan Crouch
- Gideon Somerville
- Kate Somerville
- Philippa Somerville
- Samuel Harvey

=== Main historical characters ===
- Mary de Guise, Queen Dowager of Scotland
- Tom Erskine
- Walter Scott of Branxholme and Buccleuch
- His son, William Scott of Kincurd
- Janet Beaton

=== Main locations ===
- Edinburgh, Scotland
- Stirling, Scotland
- The Lowlands of Scotland (including the fictional Midculter Castle)
- Northumbria, England (including the fictional Manor of Flaw Valleys and Hadrian's Wall)
- Threave Castle, Scotland

== Queens' Play (1964) ==
Lymond takes on an alias in order to infiltrate the French court and protect the young Mary, Queen of Scots, from her would-be assassins.

=== Main fictional characters ===
- Francis Crawford of Lymond, Master of Culter
- Sybilla Crawford, Dowager Baroness Culter
- Richard Crawford, Third Baron Culter
- Phelim O'Liam Roe, Irish leader
- Thady Boy Ballagh, Irish bard
- Oonagh O'Dwyer, Mistress of Cormac O'Connor
- Archie Abernethy, Elephant Keeper

=== Main historical characters ===
- Mary de Guise, Queen Dowager of Scotland
- Margaret Erskine
- Jenny Fleming, Mistress of the King of France
- John (Stewart) D'Aubigny, exiled Scot, living in France
- George Douglas, Scottish nobleman, visiting France
- Cormac O'Connor, claimant to the Irish throne

=== Main locations ===
- Paris, France
- Blois, France
- London, England
- Falkland Palace, Scotland

== The Disorderly Knights (1966) ==
Lymond travels to the Isle of Malta, home to the Crusading Order of Knights Hospitaller of St John, just before the Ottoman Turks lay siege to it.

=== Main fictional characters ===
- Francis Crawford of Lymond
- Jerott Blyth, childhood friend of Francis Crawford, French merchant and Knight of St John
- Sir Graham ("Gabriel") Reid Malett, Knight Grand Cross of the Order of St John
- Joleta Reid Malett, Sir Graham's younger sister
- Randy Bell, Alec Guthrie, and Adam Blacklock, men of the company of St Mary's
- Oonagh O'Dwyer
- Kate Somerville, English landowner and friend of the Crawfords
- Philippa Somerville, daughter of Kate Somerville

=== Main historical characters ===
- Juan de Homedes, Grand Master of the Order of St John of Jerusalem, Rhodes and Malta
- Galatian de Cesel, Governor of Gozo
- Nicolas de Nicolay, Knight of the Order of St John
- Marie de Guise, Queen Dowager of Scotland
- Gaspard De Villiers, Governor of Tripoli
- Dragut Rais, Corsair

=== Main locations ===
- Birgu, Malta
- Mdina, Malta
- Gozo, Malta
- Tripoli, North Africa
- Scottish Borders, including St Mary's Loch
- Edinburgh, Scotland

== Pawn in Frankincense (1969) ==
Lymond embarks upon a hunt for the child who may or may not be his and crosses Europe and North Africa following the trail of clues an adversary has laid for him. He arrives at the glittering court of the Ottoman sultan Suleiman the Magnificent.

=== Main fictional characters ===
- Francis Crawford of Lymond
- Jerott Blyth, childhood friend of Francis Crawford, French Merchant and Knight of St John
- Jubrael Pasha, officer at the court of Suleiman the Magnificent
- The Dame de Doubtance, caster of horoscopes, from France
- Georges Gaultier, her associate
- Marthe, his niece
- Philippa Somerville, daughter of Kate Somerville
- Mikal, a pilgrim of Love
- Güzel (Kiaya Khátún), mistress of the Harem of Dragut Rais
- Onophrion Zitwitz, master of Lymond's household
- Salablanca, Moor

=== Main historical characters ===
- Leone Strozzi, of Florence, Prior of Capua in the Order of the Knights Hospitaller of St. John
- Salah Rais, Viceroy of Algiers
- Aga Morat, Turkish Governor of Tripoli
- Gabriel de Luetz, Baron et Seigneur d'Aramon et de Valabregues, French Ambassador to Turkey
- Roxelana Sultan (Khourrem), wife of Suleiman the Magnificent
- Suleiman the Magnificent, Sultan of Turkey and Lord of the Ottoman Empire
- Jean Chesnau, French Chargé d'Affaires at Constantinople

=== Main locations ===
- Baden, in Switzerland
- Algiers, in modern-day Algeria
- Bône, modern-day Annaba (and ancient Hippo) in Algeria
- Monastir, in modern-day Tunisia
- Mehedia, modern-day Mahdia in Tunisia
- Zakynthos, an island off the coast of Greece
- Aleppo, in Syria
- Djerba, an island off the coast of modern-day Tunisia
- Thessalonika, in Greece
- Zuara, in modern-day Libya
- Chios, in modern-day Greece, close to the coast of Turkey
- Constantinople, capital city of the Ottoman Empire

== The Ringed Castle (1971) ==
Lymond arrives at the court of the Russian Tsar Ivan the Terrible.

=== Main fictional characters ===
- Francis Crawford of Lymond
- Richard Crawford, 3rd Baron of Culter, Lymond's older brother
- Sybilla Crawford, Dowager Lady Culter, Lymond's mother
- Danny Hislop, Alec Guthrie, Adam Blacklock, Fergie Hoddim, Lancelot Plummer, and Ludovic d'Harcourt, men of the company of St Mary's
- Kate Somerville, English landowner and friend of the Crawfords
- Philippa Somerville, daughter of Kate Somerville
- Guzel, kingmaker

=== Main historical characters ===
- Ivan IV Vasilyevich, Tsar of Russia
- Margaret Douglas, Countess of Lennox
- Diccon Chancellor, explorer and navigator
- Osep Nepaja, ambassador
- Mary I of England, Queen of England
- Princess Elizabeth of England
- John Dee, mathematician, astronomer, astrologer, occultist, navigator
- Dmytro Vyshnevetsky, Lithuanian prince

=== Main locations ===
- The Lowlands of Scotland (including the fictional Midculter Castle)
- London, England
- Moscow, in the then Tsardom of Russia
- Archangel, in the then Tsardom of Russia

== Checkmate (1975) ==
In 1557, Lymond, Comte de Sévigné, is once again in France, leading an army against England. Meanwhile, Mary, Queen of Scots, prepares to marry the French Dauphin.

=== Main fictional characters ===
- Francis Crawford of Lymond and Sévigné
- Richard Crawford, Lymond's older brother
- Sybilla Crawford, Lymond's mother
- Philippa Somerville

=== Main historical characters ===
- Mary Stewart, queen of Scots
- Henri II, king of France
- Catherine d'Albon, French noblewoman

== Reading aids ==
- The Dorothy Dunnett Companion (1994, ISBN 978-0-7181-3775-5) and The Dorothy Dunnett Companion II (2002, ISBN 978-0-7181-4546-0) by Elspeth Morrison – Dorothy Dunnett aided in the compilation, and wrote some of the entries for this book, which provide background information to historical characters and events featured in the Lymond Chronicles and The House of Niccolò, as well as explanations of classical allusions and literary and other quotations used in the two series, notes to sources of these citations, and many maps. The second volume contains a bibliography of many of the hundreds of primary and secondary sources Dunnett used in her historical research.
- Ultimate Guide to Dorothy Dunnett's The Game of Kings by Laura Caine Ramsey, J.D. (2013, LymondGuides.com) – An illustrated encyclopaedic resource of translations and historical, literary, mythological, musical, and poetic references in the order in which they appear in the series.
- Dorothy Dunnett’s Lymond Chronicles: The Enigma of Francis Crawford by Scott Richardson (2016, ISBN 978-0-8262-2081-3)
