= Peter von Danzig (ship) =

15th-century ship

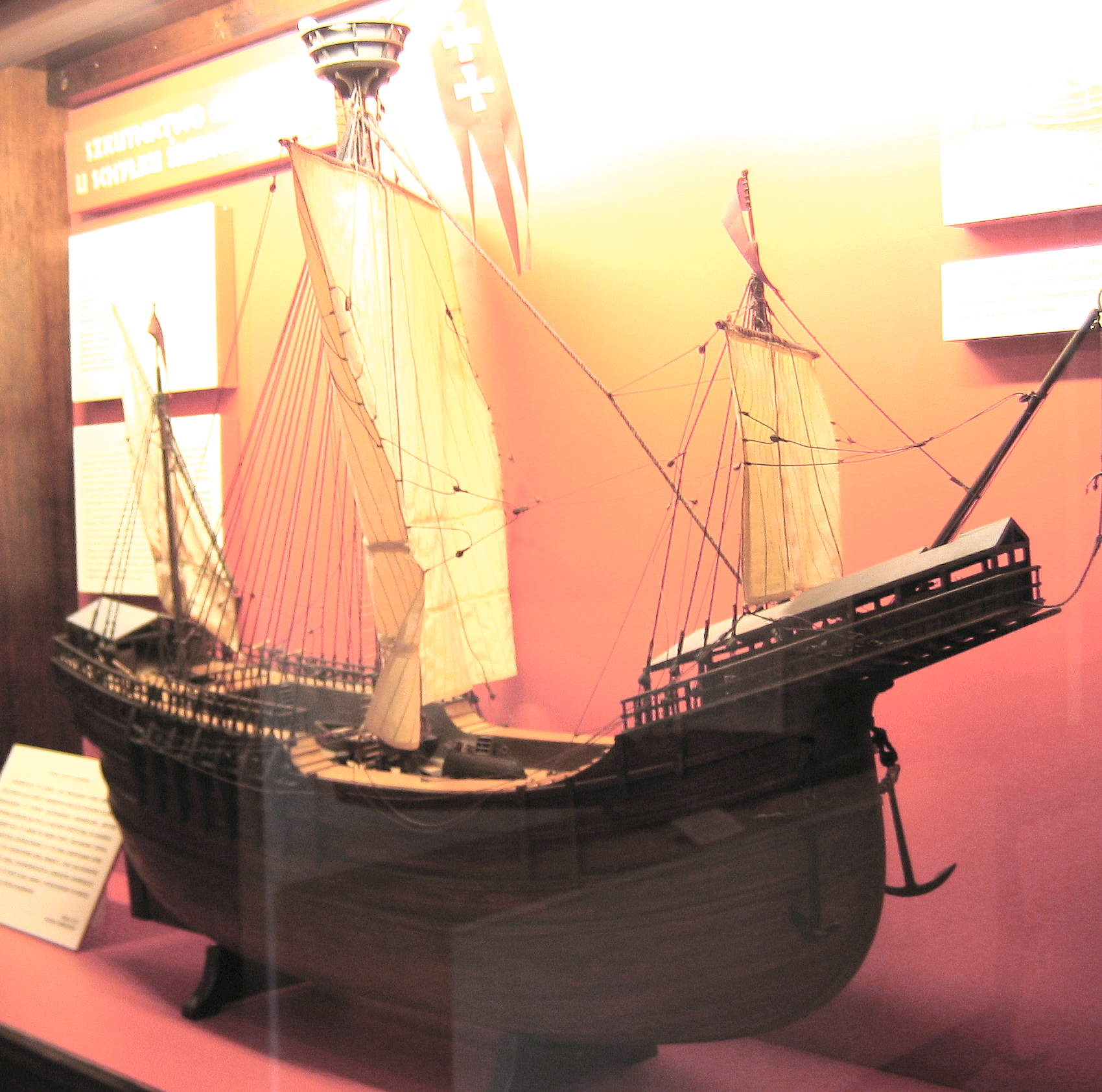
- Peter von Danzig (1462)

History

Hanseatic Flag of Danzig
- Name: Peter von Danzig
- Acquired: by Danzig, 1462
- Decommissioned: Second half of the 1470s
- Home port: Danzig

General characteristics
- Type: Carrack
- Displacement: ca. 1600 tons
- Tons burthen: ca. 800 tons
- Length: ca. 51 m (167 ft 4 in) on deck; ca. 31 m (101 ft 8 in) keel
- Beam: ca. 12 m (39 ft 4 in)
- Height: 9.1 m (29 ft 10 in) without keel
- Draft: 5 m (16 ft 5 in) without keel, 5.33 m (17 ft 6 in) with keel
- Propulsion: 760 m^{2} (8,181 sq ft) of sails
- Boats & landing craft carried: 1×7.5 m esping, 1×4.5 m boat
- Crew: 50 sailors, 300 marines
- Armament: 18 guns

Peter von Danzig was a 15th-century ship of the Hanseatic League. The three-masted ship was the first large vessel in the Baltic Sea with carvel planking.

== Career ==
Peter von Danzig was built on the French west coast, and originally named Pierre de la Rochelle or Peter van Rosseel. The ship arrived in Danzig in 1462, carrying sea salt from the Atlantic. While anchored at roadstead, she was damaged by lightning.

The ship lay for a while in Danzig harbour, waiting to be repaired, but was then converted to a warship in 1469 after the Hanseatic league had declared war on England.

Between August 1471 and 1473, Peter von Danzig operated in the North Sea under captain Paul Beneke, hunting English merchantmen with a letter of marque and securing Hanseatic league convoys. After the Treaty of Utrecht (1474), the ship undertook several trade trips abroad, before she appears to have been decommissioned in the late 1470s.

== See also ==
- List of ships of the Hanseatic League
- Baochuan
- Flor de la Mar
- Jong (ship)

== Sources ==
- Jochen Brennecke: Geschichte der Schiffahrt, Künzelsau 1986 (2nd ed.) ISBN 3-89393-176-7, p. 62
- Propyläen Technikgeschichte (Ed. Wolfgang König): Karl-Heinz Ludwig, Volker Schmidtchen: Metalle und Macht. 1000 bis 1600. Berlin, Frankfurt/Main 1992 (2nd ed.) ISBN 3-549-05227-8
- Możejko, Beata (2020). Peter von Danzig: The Story of a Great Caravel, 1462-1475. leiden: BRILL. ISBN 978-90-04-40844-9.
