= The House of Niccolò =

Series of historical novels by Dorothy Dunnett

- Niccolò Rising (1986); Spring of the Ram (1987); Race of Scorpions (1989); Scales of Gold (1991); The Unicorn Hunt (1993); To Lie with Lions (1995); Caprice and Rondo (1997); Gemini (2000)
- Author: Dorothy Dunnett
- Language: English
- Genre: Historical fiction
- Publisher: Alfred A. Knopf (US first ed.); Michael Joseph (UK first ed.)
- Published: 1986–2000
- Media type: Print (hardcover)
- No. of books: 8
- Preceded by: Lymond Chronicles

The House of Niccolò is a series of eight historical novels by Dorothy Dunnett set in the mid-fifteenth-century European Renaissance. The protagonist of the series is Nicholas de Fleury (Niccolò, Nicholas van der Poele, or Claes), a boy of uncertain birth who rises to the heights of European merchant banking and international political intrigue. The series shares many of locations with Dunnett's earlier six-volume series, the Lymond Chronicles: Scotland, England, France, Russia, and the Ottoman Empire. The House of Niccolò extends much further geographically to take in the important urban centers of Bruges, Venice, Florence, Geneva, and the Hanseatic League; Burgundy, Flanders, and Poland; Iceland; the Iberian Peninsula and Madeira; the Black Sea cities of Trebizond and Caffa; Persia; the Mediterranean islands of Cyprus and Rhodes; Egypt and the Sinai Peninsula; and West Africa and the city of Timbuktu.

== Overview ==
The eight volumes of The House of Niccolò are part of what Dunnett viewed as a larger fourteen-volume work, which includes the six novels of the Lymond Chronicles series. The Lymond Chronicles was written prior to The House of Niccolò but is set chronologically later, telling the story of descendants of characters in The House of Niccolò in the following century. The House of Niccolò includes occasional foreshadowing of events in the Lymond Chronicles. Dunnett recommended readers read the books in the order they were written, beginning with the Lymond Chronicles and then reading The House of Niccolò.

As with the Lymond Chronicles, the series features a number of historical persons, many as important characters. Both the historical and fictional characters are, however, taken from a wider variety of occupations and social classes than in the Lymond Chronicles. There are significant differences in narrative approach and writing style between the series, reflecting in part the very different personal journey taken by the central character in each.

=== Nicholas de Fleury ===
On the first page of the first book in the series, the central character is introduced as Claes, a large, cheerful, goodnatured eighteen-year-old dyer's apprentice, in whose wake trouble and upsets of the most grand and hilarious kind often follow. Of unfortunate birth, Claes was taken in by relatives-by-marriage of his mother's after she died, and has been raised as an apprentice and sometime companion to the son and heir of the Charretty company in Bruges. It soon becomes apparent that Claes, or Nicholas, who at the time goes by the last name van der Poele, is a polymath and polyglot, and is turning himself into a leader of men and player of great games. He loves creating and solving puzzles of all kinds, he is highly numerate, and applies himself to learning whatever he can (languages, engineering, warcraft, courtly manners, philosophy), both for practical purposes and for the sake of learning. From apprentice, he rises to merchant, banker, master of warcraft, and adviser to kings.

Nicholas believes, having been told so by his mother, Sophie de Fleury, that he is the legitimate son of the handsome Simon de St. Pol of Kilmirren, a Scottish lord, champion jouster, and merchant. Simon denies this, claiming that Nicholas is a bastard born to his first wife, and no get of his. Nicholas's desire for acceptance from what he believes is his father's family, and their disdain for him, are the force and conflict that drive much of the series, which takes Nicholas and his friends and enemies across most of the known world.

== The series ==
The eight volumes in the series are as follows:

=== Niccolò Rising (1986) ===
Set largely in Flanders, Burgundy, and Italy in 1460. In this book, the reader is introduced into a world very different yet subtly similar to present times. Ambitions clash with class, judgements are made based on blood lines while almost impermeable class barriers ensure society is spared from having to deal with "inferiors". The characters are quietly and subtly developed. Like flesh and blood persons, they often act before they have all the facts and even then are sometimes hard pressed to understand their own motives.

=== Spring of the Ram (1987) ===
Set largely in Trebizond, last remaining outpost of the Byzantine empire, on the Black Sea, in 1461. With Western support against the Ottomans still unsolidified, David of Trebizond prematurely asks the Sultan for a remission of the tribute paid by his predecessor. Even worse, he makes these demands through the envoys of Uzun Hassan, who makes even more arrogant demands on behalf of their master. Sultan Mehmed responds in the summer of 1461: a fleet under his admiral Kassim Pasha sails along the Black Sea coast of Anatolia towards Trebizond while he leads an army from Bursa eastward. After a month-long siege, the city — and with it the empire — falls.

=== Race of Scorpions (1989) ===
1462–1463. Set largely in Cyprus, during the wars between Queen Carlotta and her half-brother James de Lusignan (Zacco) for control of the island kingdom.

=== Scales of Gold (1991) ===
1464–1467. Set largely in Venice, Portugal, Madeira, and Mali, during a voyage to discover the source of West African gold, and a West-East route to the Christian Ethiopian kingdom of Prester John.

=== The Unicorn Hunt (1993) ===
1468–1470. Set largely in Scotland, Flanders, Florence, the Tyrol, Venice, Egypt, the Sinai peninsula, and Cyprus. Niccolo reacts to Gelis's challenge and attempts to find his son. He also increasingly competes with Anselm Adorne.

=== To Lie with Lions (1995) ===
1471–1473. Set largely in Scotland, Iceland, and Flanders.

=== Caprice and Rondo (1997) ===
1474–1476. Set largely in Italy, Poland, the Crimea, Persia, Russia, and Flanders/Burgundy.

=== Gemini (2000) ===
1477–1483. Set largely in Scotland and France.

== Reading aids ==
Dunnett helped in the compiling of The Dorothy Dunnett Companion (1994) and The Dorothy Dunnett Companion II (2002) by Elspeth Morrison. These books provide background information to historical characters and events featured in the Lymond Chronicles and The House of Niccolò, as well as explanations of classical allusions and literary and other quotations used in the two series, notes to sources of these citations, and many maps. The second volume also contains a bibliography of many of the hundreds of primary and secondary sources Dunnett used in her historical research.

- Morrison, Elspeth (1994). Dorothy Dunnett Companion. London: Michael Joseph. ISBN 0-7181-3775-2.
- Morrison, Elspeth (2002). Dorothy Dunnett Companion. Vol. 2. London: Michael Joseph. ISBN 0-7181-4546-1.
