= Kolding (disambiguation) =

Kolding is a Danish seaport in Southern Denmark.

Kolding may also refer to:

- Kolding (horse), a New Zealand-bred racehorse
- Kolding (surname), a list of people with the surname
- Kolding cog, a shipwreck found in 1943
- Kolding FC, an association football club based in Kolding, Denmark
- Kolding Fjord, a fjord in Denmark
- Kolding Gymnasium, a school in Denmark
- Kolding IF, an association football club based in Kolding, Denmark
- Kolding IF Women, an association football club based in Kolding, Denmark
- Kolding Municipality, a municipality in Denmark
- Kolding Storcenter, a shopping mall in Denmark
- Battle of Kolding (disambiguation), multiple battles between Denmark and other countries
- KIF Kolding, a handball club based in Kolding, Denmark
- Vejle Boldklub Kolding, a Danish association football club
