= List of maritime disasters =

The list of maritime disasters is a link page for maritime disasters by century.

For a unified list of peacetime disasters by death toll, see List of accidents and disasters by death toll § Peacetime maritime.

== Pre-18th century ==
=== Peacetime disasters ===
All ships are vulnerable to problems from weather conditions, faulty design or human error. Some of the disasters below occurred during periods of conflict, although their losses were unrelated to any military action. The table listings are in decreasing order of the magnitude of casualties.

Year	Country	Description	Deaths	Image
1495	Denmark	Gribshunden – Flagship of John, King of Denmark caught fire and burned down while in the Baltic Sea off the coast of Ronneby in southeastern Sweden, becoming one of the best-preserved shipwrecks from the late medieval period. Exact number of deaths unknown, reported only as many of the crew of 150.	many of the crew of 150	
1694	England	HMS Sussex – the third-rate ship was lost in a fierce storm on 1 March off Gibraltar. There were two survivors from a crew of 500.	498	
1120	England	White Ship – Ship carrying William Adelin, heir to the English Throne and the Duchy of Normandy, and more than 300 others. The drunken crew ran it aground in the English Channel. There was one survivor, a butcher from Rouen, and the loss was followed by 20 years of civil war over the English crown.	299	
1647	Dutch Republic	Princess Amelia – On 27 September, Captain Bol mistook the Bristol Channel for the English Channel and ran it aground off the Mumbles, Wales where it broke apart. Of 107 passengers aboard, 21 survived.	86	
1682	England	HMS Gloucester (1660) - wrecked off the port of Yarmouth while carrying James, Duke of York (who survived.)	150	
1468	Finland	Hanneke Vrome - a hulk transporting passengers and valuable cargo sank off Raseborg, Finland in a storm on November 20, 1468.	180	

=== Wartime disasters ===
Disasters with great loss of life can occur in times of armed conflict. Shown below are some of the known events with major losses.

Year	Country	Description	Lives lost	Image
256 BC; 253 BC	Roman Republic	Sinking of the Roman fleet in the First Punic War – In the First Punic War, between the Roman Republic and Carthage, a Roman fleet that had just rescued a Roman army from Africa was caught in a Mediterranean storm.	90,000+	
1274; 1281	Mongol Empire	Kamikaze – The Mongol fleet destroyed by a typhoon.	100,000+	
1588	Spain	Spanish Armada – On 8 August, Philip II of Spain sent the Armada to invade England. Spain lost 15,000–20,000 soldiers and sailors, mainly in storms rather than battle.	15,000–20,000	
1589	England	English Armada – Also known as the Counter Armada or the Drake-Norris expedition, it was a fleet of warships sent to the Iberian coast by Queen Elizabeth I in 1589. The Armada was commanded by Sir Francis Drake as admiral and Sir John Norreys as general. The Armada unsuccessfully attacked Cádiz before withdrawing.	11,000–15,000	
1588	Spain	Girona – On 28 October, as part of the Spanish Armada, the Spanish galleass was sunk in a gale off Ireland. Of the estimated 1,300 people aboard, nine survived; 260 bodies were washed ashore.	1,291	
1564	Sweden	Mars – A Swedish warship that was sunk 18 kilometres north of Öland during the Northern Seven Years' War. The crown ship of King Eric XIV of Sweden's fleet. The gunpowder store exploded and as many as 1,000 people, including Swedes and the invading Lübeckians, died.	900–1100	
1692	France	Soleil Royal – On 3 June, in the Battle of La Hougue, the French flagship was attacked by 17 ships at Pointe du Hommet. The ship managed to repel them with artillery fire, but a fire ship set its stern afire and the fire soon reached its powder rooms. The people of Cherbourg came to the rescue, but there was only one survivor out of 883 to 950 crew.	882–949	
1676	Sweden	Kronan – In the Battle of Öland, the warship capsized while turning. Gunpowder aboard ignited and exploded. Of the estimated 800 aboard, 42 survived.	758	
1545	England	Mary Rose – The warship sank in the Battle of the Solent on 19 July. The cause is unknown, but believed to have been due to water entering its open gunports. About 500 people were lost.	480–520	
1591	England	Revenge – After being captured in battle, the English galleon was lost in a storm near the Azores. An estimated 200 Spanish sailors who captured it were lost.	200	
1678	France	Las Aves disaster – on 11 May a French fleet commanded by Admiral Jean II d'Estrées was wrecked on the Las Aves archipelago in the Caribbean Sea due to an error in navigation. Nine of the fleets 30 ships were lost. Estimates of the lives lost vary wildly, from 24 to more than 1,500.	24–1,500	

== See also ==
- Shipwreck
- List of shipwrecks
- List of disasters
- List of accidents and disasters by death toll
- List by death toll of ships sunk by submarines
- List of RORO vessel accidents
- List of air disasters
