= Hulk (medieval ship type) =

Type of medieval sea craft

A hulk (or "holk") was a type of medieval ship used mostly for transports. The hulk appears to have remained a relatively minor type of sailing ship apparently peculiar to the Low Countries of Europe, where it was probably used primarily as a river or canal boat, with limited potential for coastal cruising. The only evidence of hulks is from legal documents and iconography, though it is possible that a shipwreck found on the coast of Estonia in early 2022 might be the only known surviving example of a hulk.

== History ==
The name hulk may come from the Greek word holkas, meaning a towed boat, which would be consistent with the use of the hulk as a river barge. The word hulk also has a medieval meaning of "hollowed-out" or "husk-like" which is also apposite for the shape of the basic hulk. It is not clear when the hulk first appeared in medieval Europe. There is a lack of archaeological evidence because no wreck except possibly one from the 14th century and unconfirmed, has been found. The only evidence of hulks comes from iconography of ships scholars believe to be hulks and medieval documentation of trade and regulations. It is commonly accepted by scholars that the hulk originated in the European Low Countries as a river vessel. However, a conclusive origin point for the hulk is not known. References to hulks in Aethelred II's legal code from England date from 1000 C.E. Hulks had fewer taxes levied on them than keels and cogs, with the tax tied to the amount of goods. By the fourteenth century, English regulations imposed greater taxes on hulks than other vessels, meaning that they were carrying more cargo than other vessels. This points to an increase in the hull size of hulks. It was by the fourteenth century that the Hanseatic League had adopted the hulk as their main vessel, capable of rivaling the cog's carrying capacity. Whether this was a consequence of a perception of the cog's shortcomings or a result of a shift in the economic geography of Northern Europe towards the Dutch Low Countries is not easy to discern. By the 15th century, the hulk was replaced by the caravel.

== Design and function ==
Hulks were depicted with a single mast at the amidship that was commonly depicted with a square sail. The hull was constructed using reverse-clinker planking which involves starting clinker planking at the sheer strake and planking down to the keel. A hulk had two castles, one at the bow and one at the stern. Hulks went through two forms of rudder design. Earlier depictions showed hulks with a starboard quarter-rudder, while later depictions had median rudders. The overall design of the hulk appears to borrow or build on earlier shipbuilding traditions. The single mast with a square sail and the use of a quarter rudder appear to be borrowed from Viking vessels while the shape of the keel is similar to that of cogs. The weakest part of an enlarged hulk would be its stem and stern. Since it has no substantial stem or stern posts those parts of the boat would have to be reinforced by the introduction of substantial aprons and breasthooks, perhaps augmented by sacrificial stem and stern posts between which the unsupported hull planking could be sandwiched. Using these techniques, perhaps better understood as a result of technological transfers from architectural woodworking, shipwrights were able to extend the hulk in size until it rivaled and surpassed the cog.

Because of their widespread use by the Hanseatic League and English documents regarding trade, it is accepted by scholars that the hulk was predominantly a cargo vessel. It is also possible that hulks served as warships. The use of the median rudder as well as oars as depicted in some illuminated manuscripts would make the hulk more maneuverable than the cog, and the larger vessel could provide a better platform for fighting.

== Depictions of hulks from medieval Europe ==
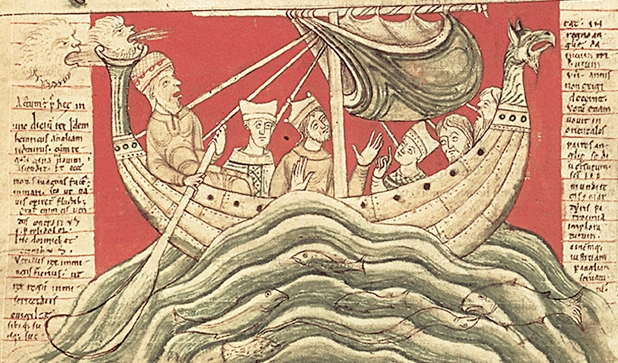
A page from John of Worcester's Chronicle that depicts Henry I in a hulk ship. This chronicle is meant to show the dreams of Henry I.

- Town seal of New Shoreham (1295) – a seal that depicts a ship resembling a hulk with a single centered mast, two castles on either end, and reverse-clinker planking.
- John of Worcester's Chronicle (completed prior to his death in 1140)
- Life of St. Thomas of Canterbury (1240)
- Holkhan Bible Picture Book (c. 1327–1335)
- John Lydgate's Life of Saints Edmund and Fremund (c. 1443–1444)
- Seal of the Admiralty Court of Bristol (1446)

== Tallinn shipwreck ==
In 2022 two large medieval shipwrecks were discovered beneath Lootsi Street in Tallinn, Estonia. This street was built on land reclaimed from the sea. Initially believed to be cogs, one of the ships has been identified as a hulk due to the presence of a second mast mounting, a flat-bottomed hull and plank structures previously believed to have been introduced over a century later. It was built in Scandinavia around 1360 and measured 24.5 metres in length, 9 metres in beam and 4 metres in height. This would make the ship a contemporary of the armed Hanseatic League hulk Hanneke Vrome, wrecked in 1368 off the coast of Finland. Artefacts retrieved from the Tallinn ship include shoes, spoons, tools, weapons, a compass, and the remains of two rats. Archaeologists have theorised that the ship sank after running aground on a sandbar. The ship is currently undergoing conservation in the Estonian maritime museum.
