= Bremen cog =

Wreck of a cog in the German Maritime Museum in Bremerhaven

Coordinates: 53.5399°N 8.5771°E

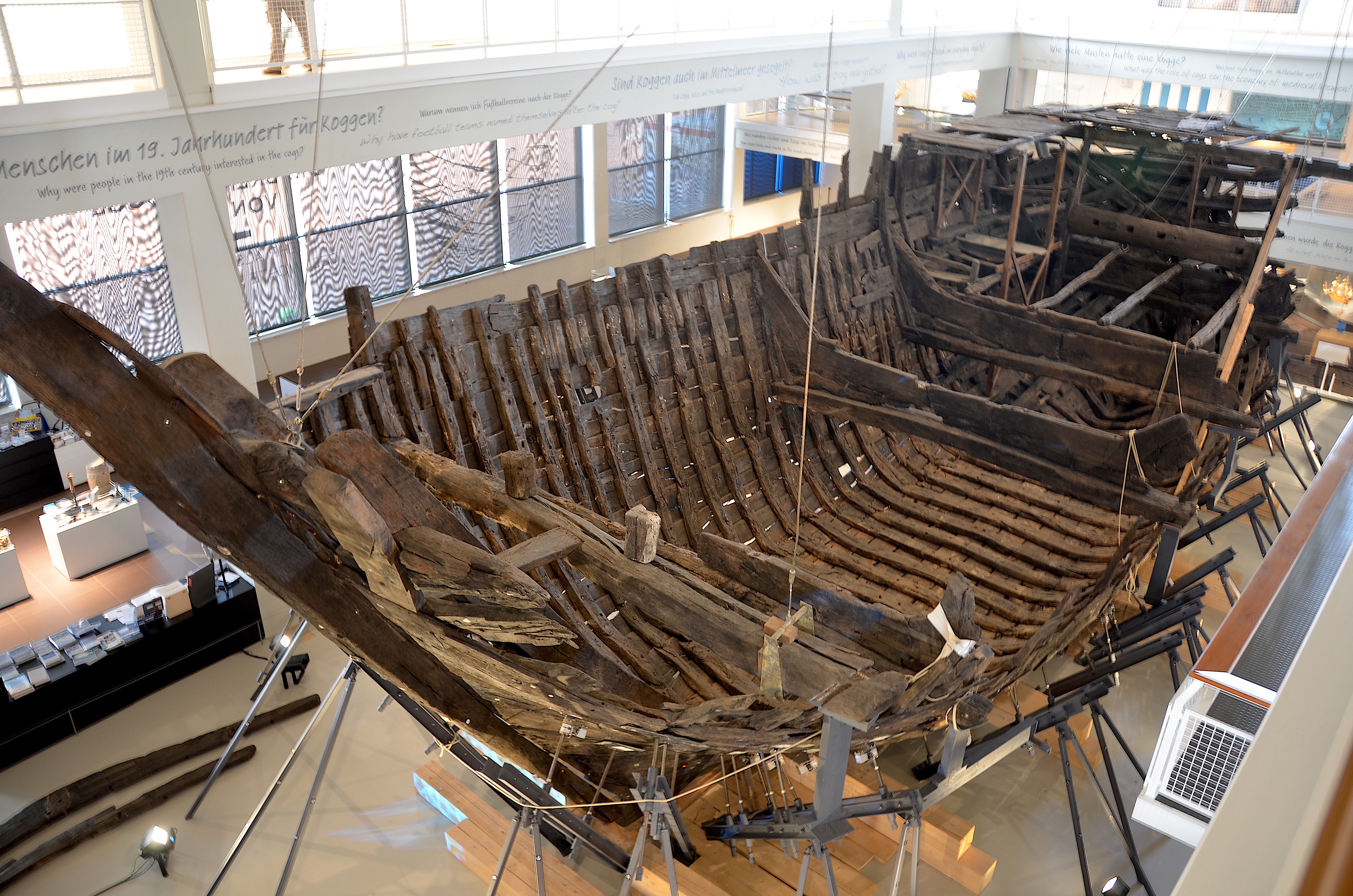
- The Bremen Cog at German Maritime Museum, 2021

History
- Laid down: 1380s
- Fate: Sank while under construction, salvaged between 1962 and 1965
- Status: Currently a museum ship

General characteristics
- Class & type: Cog
- Tonnage: 90 to 130 tons
- Length: 23.27 m (76.35 ft)
- Beam: 7.62 m (25.0 ft)
- Sail plan: Square-rigged
- Notes: Dimensions taken from exhibition notes at the Hanseatic Museum in Bergen

The Bremen cog is a well-preserved wreck of a cog dated to 1380, found in 1962 in Bremen. Today, it is displayed at the German Maritime Museum in Bremerhaven as one of the main features. Three nearly identical replicas of this cog have been built: Ubena von Bremen, Hansekogge, and Roland von Bremen.

== The discovery ==
On 8 October 1962, wooden fragments of a ship were found in the Weser River during dredging operations. They turned out to be remnants of a cog that seems to have sunk during a storm flood after drifting away from a shipyard before completion. Until then, cogs had mostly been known from medieval documents and seals; there was only one earlier find in the Noordoostpolder (the Netherlands). Based on the dendrochronological analysis of the oak timber from which the cog was built, the ship was dated to about 1380 AD.

== Salvage and reconstruction ==
The large parts were measured, registered, and stored in water basins in a pier shed in Bremen to prevent the wood from drying and shrinking. A further search with the aid of a diving bell ship in 1965 retrieved more than 2,000 additional parts, which also were stored. It was decided to exhibit it in the planned German Maritime Museum in Bremerhaven. In 1972, the Koggehalle had been completed and the parts were reassembled under constant sprinkling. Almost the complete starboard side and a third of the port side could be reconstructed. The construction then was encased in a tank to be impregnated in polyethylene glycol for 18 years. Finally, it was cleared from the remnants and has been on display since 2000, 25 years after the opening of the museum.

The Bremen cog had one mast and was square-rigged, with a carvel-built bottom and clinker sides. The rib timber was built in after the hull had been made. The cog was 24 m long, 8 m in the beam, and just over 4 m high on the sides. These measurements would have produced an estimated load capacity of 130 tons. Other estimates put the cargo capacity at only 90 tons.

Replicas of the Bremen Cog

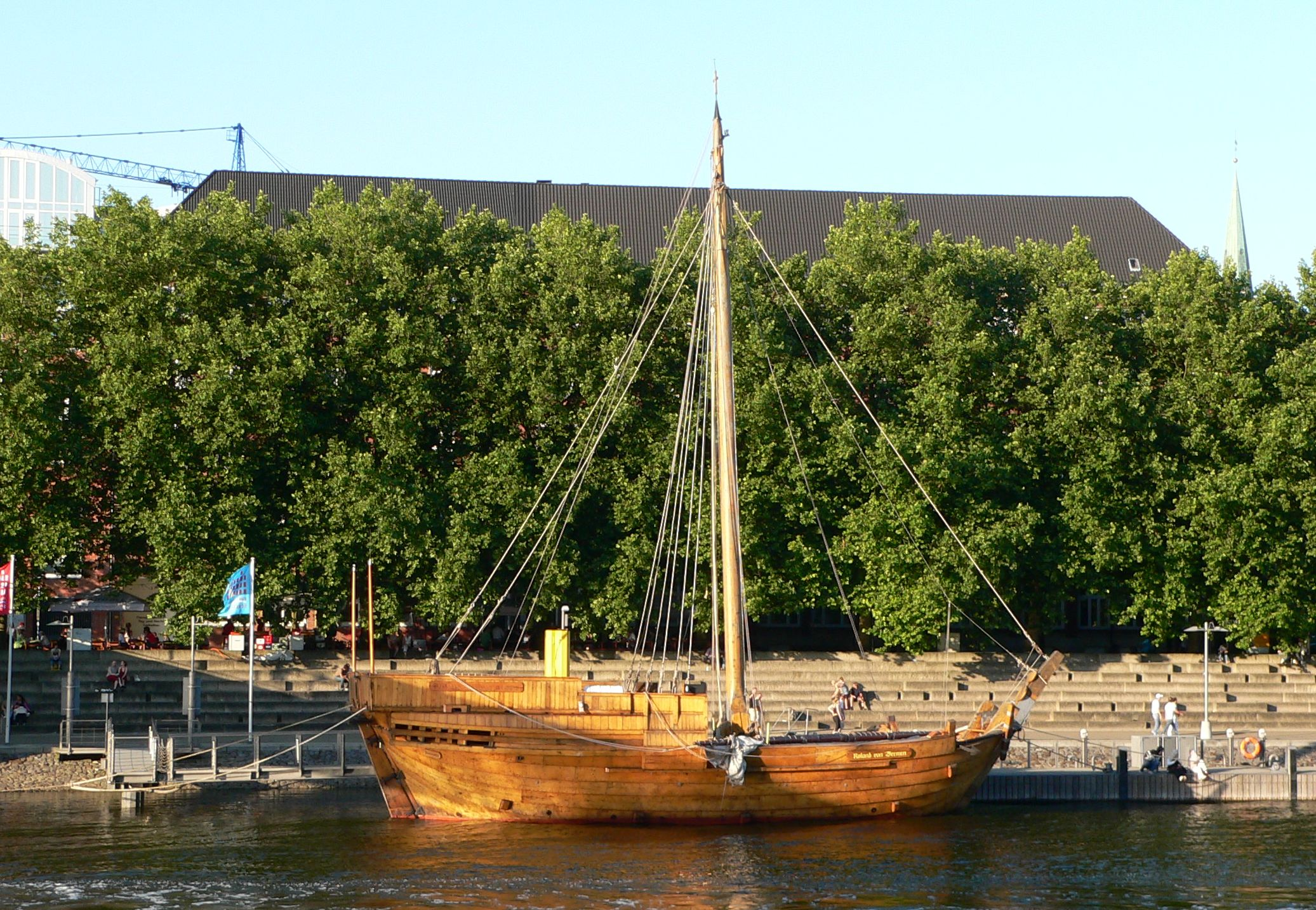
Roland von Bremen

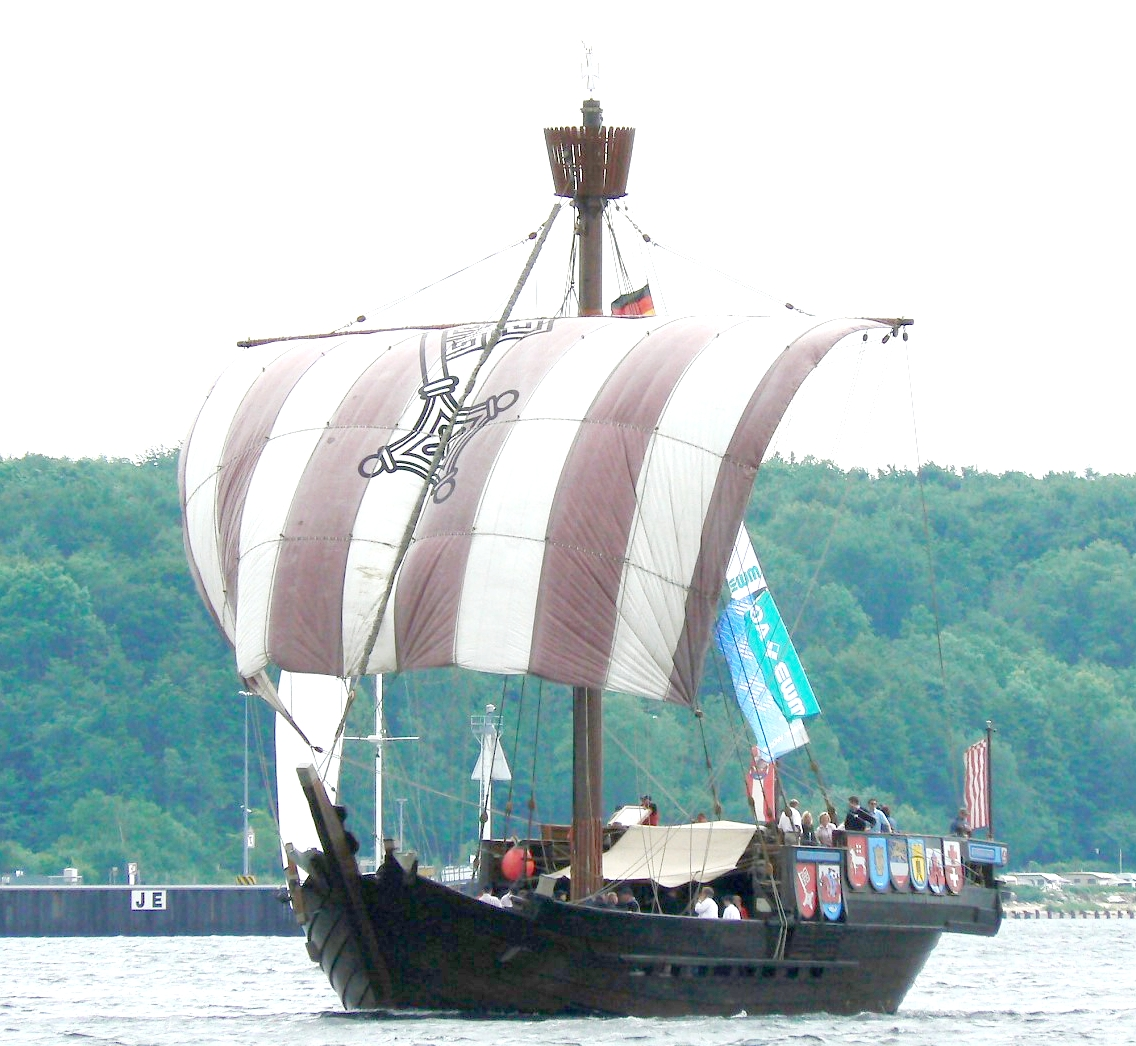
Ubena von Bremen

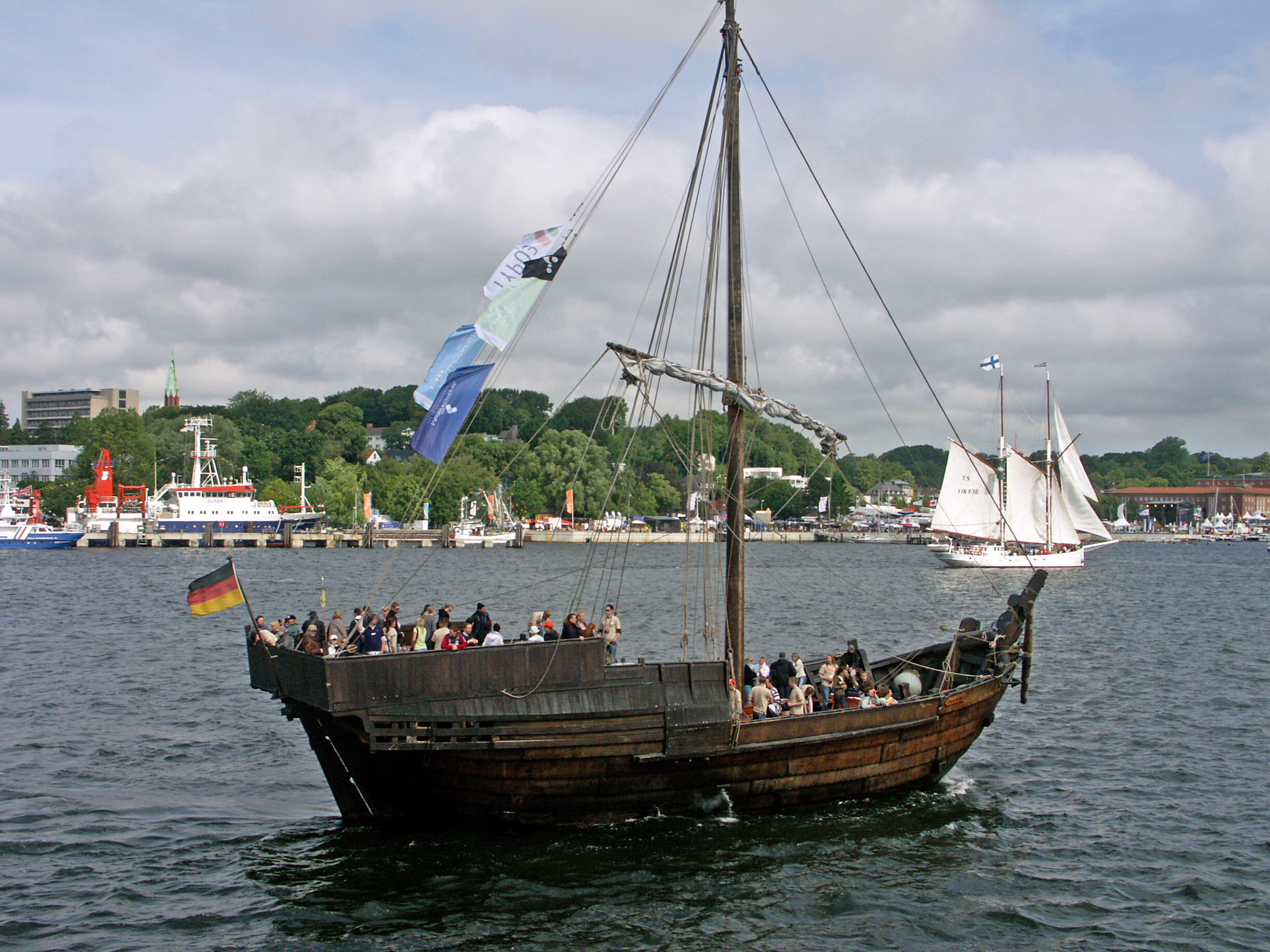
Hansekogge

== See also ==
- Kolding cog
