= Length between perpendiculars =

Form of ship length measurement

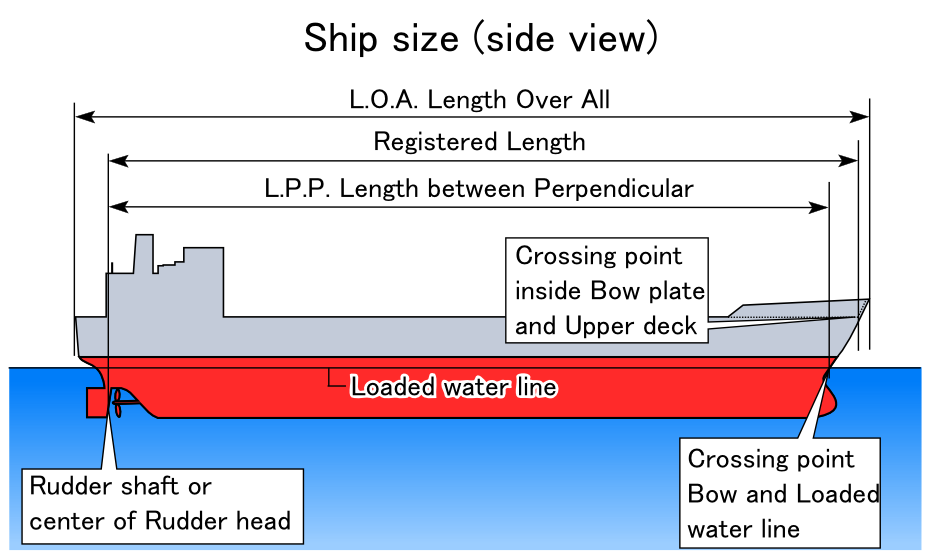
Graphical representation of the dimensions used to describe a ship.

Length between perpendiculars (often abbreviated as p/p, p.p., pp, LPP, LBP or Length BPP) is the length of a ship along the summer load line from the forward surface of the stem, or main bow perpendicular member, to the after surface of the sternpost, or main stern perpendicular member. When there is no sternpost, the centerline axis of the rudder stock is used as the aft end of the length between perpendiculars.

Measuring to the stern post or rudder stock was believed to give a reasonable idea of the ship's carrying capacity, as it excluded the small, often unusable volume contained in its overhanging ends. On some types of vessels this is, for all practical purposes, a waterline measurement. In a ship with raked stems, naturally that length changes as the draught of the ship changes, therefore it is measured from a defined loaded condition.

== See also ==
- Length overall
