= Svaelget 2 =

Shipwhreck in Denmark

Svaelget 2 is a medieval merchant cog. Its shipwreck discovered off the coast of Copenhagen. It dates to around 1410.
