= Kolding (surname) =

Kolding is a surname. Notable people with the surname include:

- Eivind Kolding (born 1959), Danish businessman
- Jens Kolding (born 1952), Danish football player
- Lisbet Kolding (born 1965), Danish football player
- Mads Pieler Kolding (born 1988), Danish badminton player

== See also ==
- Kolding (disambiguation)
