= Kolding cog =

Shipwreck that was found in Kolding Fjord in 1943

The Kolding cog is a shipwreck that was found in Kolding Fjord in 1943. The ship was a ca. 18 m long cog built of oak around the year 1190. The wreck was examined by the National Museum of Denmark in 2001. The study discovered that the Kolding cog had a stern rudder, thus making it the oldest known ship to have one.

== See also ==
- Bremen cog
