= European Hansemuseum =

Museum in Lübeck, Germany

Europäisches Hansemuseum
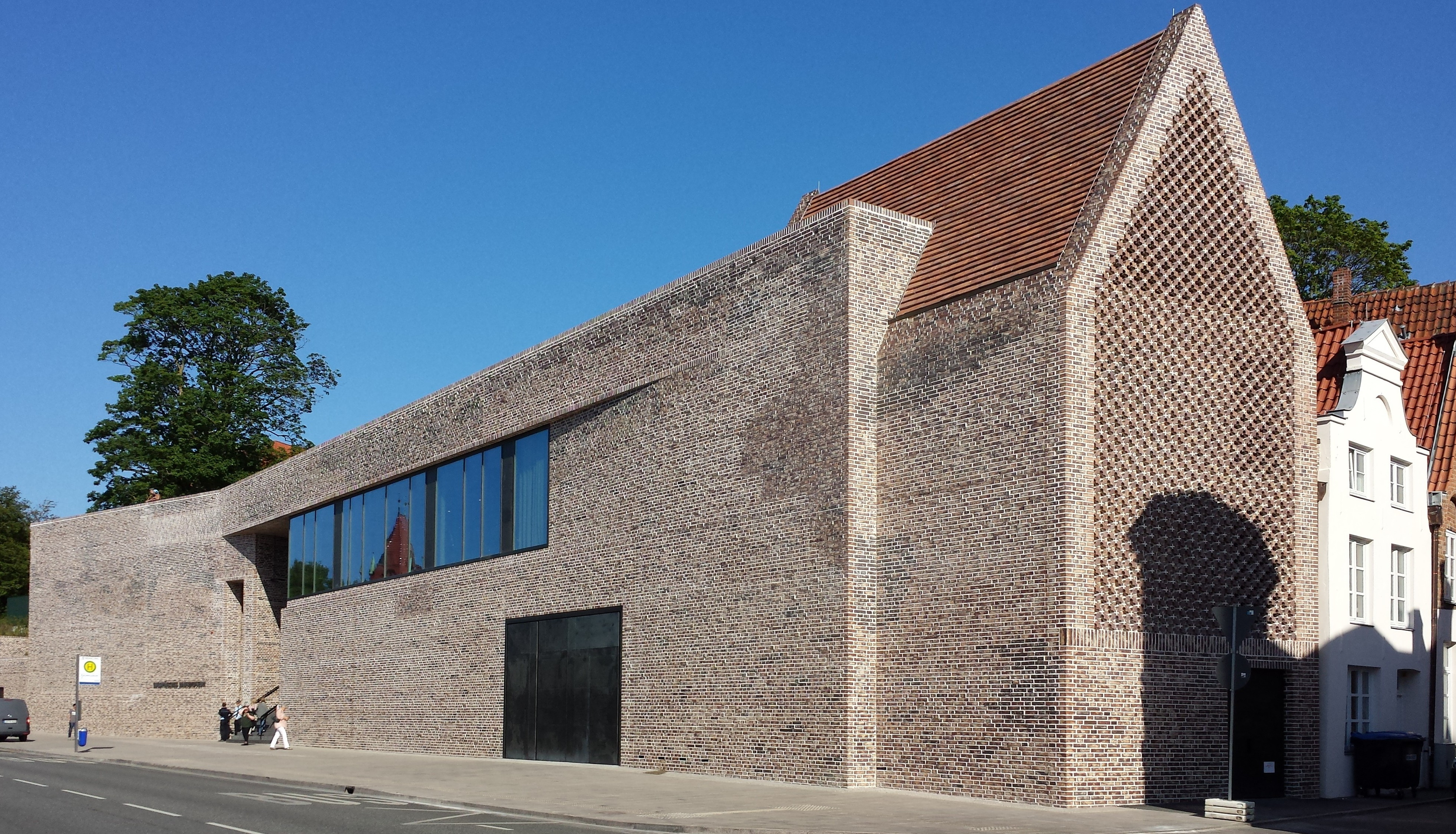
- The European Hansemuseum in 2015
- Established: 27 May 2015
- Location: Lübeck, Germany
- Coordinates: 53°52′26.8″N 10°41′22.6″E
- Type: History museum
- Website: www.hansemuseum.eu/en/

The European Hansemuseum (German: Europäisches Hansemuseum) is a museum in Lübeck, Germany dedicated to the history of the Hanseatic League. Covering an area of in total 7,405 square metres (79,710 sq ft), is the largest museum in the world specifically dedicated to this subject. The museum was opened in May 2015.

== History ==
Planning for a museum in Lübeck dedicated to the history of the Hanseatic League began in 2004. The opening of the museum was delayed several times because archaeological excavations on the site proved more time-consuming than initially imagined. The museum was officially opened by the Chancellor of Germany Angela Merkel on 27 May 2015, and received its first visitors on 30 May 2015.

== Collections and exhibitions ==
The museum consists of a permanent exhibition with exhibits of original historical objects, interactive elements and staged historical scenes from the former trading ports of the Hansa Novgorod, Bruges, Bergen and London, as well as Lübeck. The original historical items displayed include documents, paintings and gold and silver coins from the so-called Lübeck Hoard. The exhibition is aimed at informing visitors about the overall history of the Hanseatic League from its formation to its dissolution, but also about the economics and trade networks of the League as well as of everyday life in the historical time span during which the Hansa existed. It is the largest museum in the world dedicated to the history of the Hanseatic League.

== Description ==
=== Location ===
The museum is located in the northern part of the old town of the city and lies in the part of the city that is considered a World Heritage Site (Hanseatic City of Lübeck). The museum is part of the Burgkloster or Castle Friary site, a former Dominican monastery from the 13th century, and it's also to a degree integrated with the "Castle Hill" nearby. The location has been described as "one of the most important medieval monuments in northern Germany". Visitors to the museum can also access the Burgkloster and the archaeological site on which the museum was built, thus providing an insight into the development of the urban and social structure of Lübeck in parallel to the museum's exhibition chronicling the history of the Hansa.

=== Architecture ===
The museum was designed by the architectural firm Andreas Heller Architects & Designers, based in Hamburg. The building is constructed of hand-crafted bricks, and though modernist in its expression, also displays references to its historical context. Its compact wall can thus be interpreted as a reference to the old medieval city wall, part of which once was located on the site of the museum; similarly, the roof of the building can be seen as a referral to the crow-stepped gables of the old city of Lübeck, and its decoration as a contemporary interpretation of the Gothic taste for intricate quatrefoil. Inside, the layout of the museum mixes open and closed spaces and it contains, apart from the exhibition areas, also a playground and a restaurant. The museum covers an area of in total 7,405 square metres (79,710 sq ft).

== Criticism ==
After its opening, the museum has been criticised for being too dark, and the exhibits too reliant on text and not being properly contextualised.

== See also ==
- Hanseatic Museum and Schøtstuene, in Bergen, Norway
