= Hanneke Vrome =

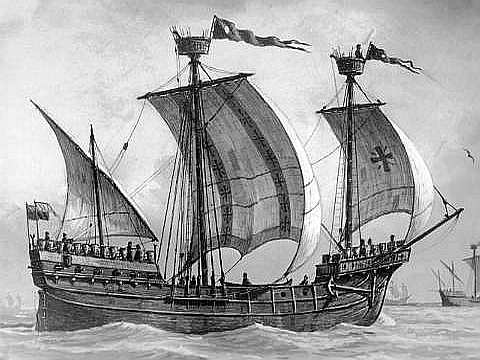
- A Hanseatic cog, a close relative of the hulk

History

Lübeck
- Name: Hanneke Vrome
- Namesake: Her captain and owner Hanne Vrome
- Out of service: 20 November 1468
- Fate: Lost at sea off the coast of Finland

General characteristics
- Type: Hulk
- Length: ca. 40 metres (130 feet)

Hanneke Vrome (or Hanneke Wrome) was a 15th-century Hanseatic hulk which sank off Raseborg, Finland on 20 November 1468. At the time she was laden with a valuable cargo which included honey, cloth and 10,000 guldens. The exact location of her wreck remains unknown.

== Final voyage and sinking ==
Hanneke Vrome was part of a four ship convoy which sailed in the winter of 1468 from Lübeck to Stockholm, with two of the ships continuing on to Hanseatic city of Tallinn, then known as Reval. The ship had 180 passengers, including members of the Zirkelgesellschaft, a fraternity of long-distance merchants. The ship also carried the wife and son of Laurens Axelsson (Tott), fiefholder of the Raseborg Castle. The vessel was heavily armed due to an ongoing war between Sweden and Denmark and had ca. 40 sailors and soldiers manning her.

When the ships had almost reached their destination, a strong gale rose which forced them to turn north towards the Finnish coast. On the evening of 20 November the Hanneke Vrome capsized taking all of her passengers and crew with her. The sinking was witnessed by people on the smaller escort ship sailing by her side, but nothing could be done due to darkness and rough weather. According to eyewitnesses the ship sank in the blink of an eye. The escorting vessel later made it to Reval with the news of the sinking.

== Aftermath ==
After the sinking significant amounts of flotsam were collected by locals on the shores of Raseborg. This led to a lengthy diplomatic correspondence between Lübeck, Stockholm, Reval and Laurens Axelsson (Tott), who considered the salvaged cargo as his property. Thanks to this correspondence it is for an example known that local peasants sold some of the cargo in Hitis and were subsequently apprehended. This dispute also prompted Hanseatic merchants to send the ship's manifest to Reval in hopes of reacquiring some of the lost cargo. It survives to this day in Tallinn city archives.

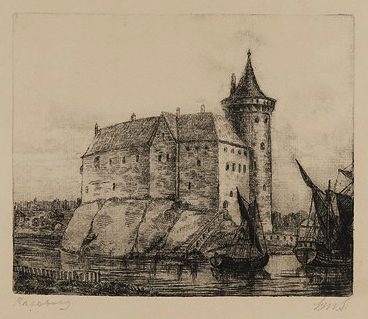
Raseborg castle in the 16th century

In Lübeck a large stone cross was erected at the harbor of Trave to commemorate the sinking, though it has since been destroyed. The story of the Hanneke Vrome was also inscribed on four pillars of the Marienkirche in the late 17th or early 18th century. In Finland Laurens Axelsson (Tott) dedicated a stone church in Karis to St. Catherine in memory of his late wife who died in the sinking.

== Location of the wreck ==
In May 2015 an archaeological diving team led by Rauno Koivusaari announced that they had found the wreck of the Hanneke Vrome. Koivusaari had previously discovered the wreck of Vrouw Maria, an 18th-century Dutch merchantman which sank carrying precious artifacts including works of art belonging to Catherine the Great of Russia. The debris field consisted of oak planks, keel, mast, anchor and smaller items which lay in the depth of 9–23 meters (30–75 ft). In the fall of that same year The Finnish Heritage Agency conducted field studies at the site, including dendrochronological sampling. This later proved that the wreck is not the Hanneke Vrome, but a ship built after 1715.

It is believed that the wreck lies somewhere on the coastline east of Hanko and west of Porkkala peninsulas.
