= Apron (disambiguation) =

An apron is a functional accessory that has been worn for thousands of years as a protective, fashionable, and/or ceremonial top layer.

Apron may also refer to:

== Architecture and construction ==
- Apron (architecture), a raised section of ornamental stonework below a window ledge, stone tablet, or monument
- Apron, an area of pavement on a motorsport circuit that separates the racing surface from the infield
- Truck apron, a paved area inside a Roundabout for the rear wheels of large trucks to use when turning.
- Apron, the flexible lower container of the air cushion of a hovercraft, also known as its skirt
- Apron, a ramp used to connect shoreside facilities with a barge or ferry, also known as a linkspan
- Airport apron, an area where aircraft are parked and serviced
- Apron stage, a part of a stage that extends past the proscenium arch and into the audience or seating area
- Apron, a large plastic panel at the bottom of a pinball table that directs the ball towards the drain.
- Apron, the lateral skirting positioned beneath a tabletop, countertop or seat

== Biology ==
- Apron, elongated labia minora
- Zingel asper, a species of fish sometimes known as an apron

== Garments ==
- Cobbler apron, a type of tabard
- Dudou, a Chinese undergarment and blouse sometimes known as an apron

== See also ==
- Blue Apron, an ingredient-and-recipe meal kit service
- Luxury tax apron, a feature of the NBA salary cap
