= Otto Hahn (ship) =

German nuclear-powered cargo vessel

NS Otto Hahn
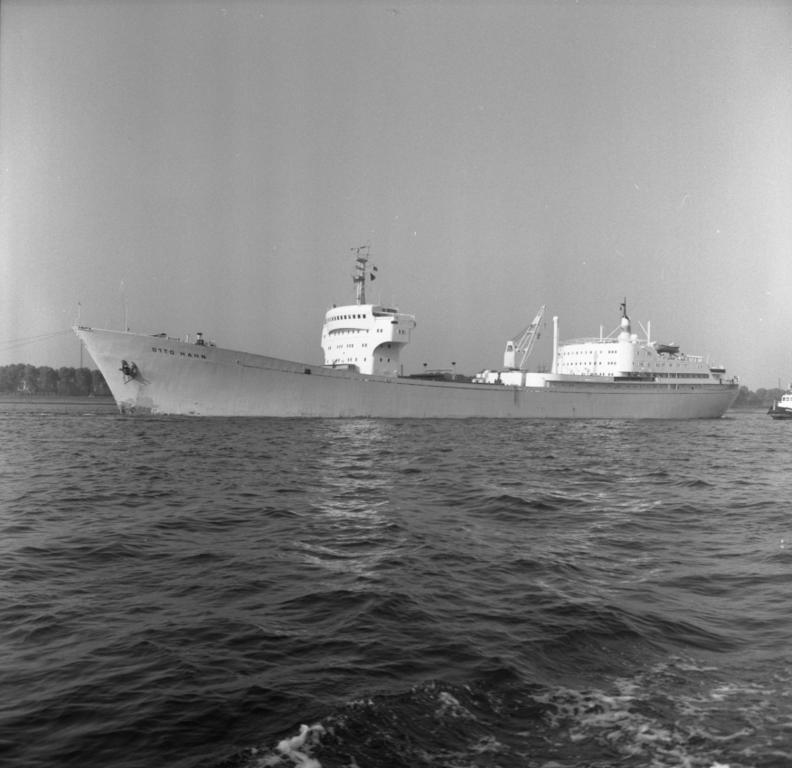
- Otto Hahn in Hamburg Harbour in June 1970

History
- Name: Otto Hahn
- Namesake: Otto Hahn
- Ordered: 27 November 1962
- Builder: Howaldtswerke, Kiel
- Cost: 56,000,000 German marks
- Yard number: 1103
- Laid down: 31 August 1963
- Launched: 13 June 1964
- Completed: 1 October 1968
- In service: 11 October 1968
- Identification: IMO number: 6416770; Callsign: DAOH
- Fate: Sold for scrap, 2009

General characteristics
- Type: Nuclear-powered cargo vessel
- Tonnage: 16,870 GRT; 14,079 DWT
- Length: 172.05 m (564 ft 6 in)
- Beam: 23.40 m (76 ft 9 in)
- Draught: 9.22 m (30 ft 3 in)
- Installed power: 11,000 metric horsepower (8.09 MW)
- Propulsion: 1 shaft; 1 four-bladed propeller
- Speed: 17 knots (31 km/h; 20 mph)
- Crew: 63

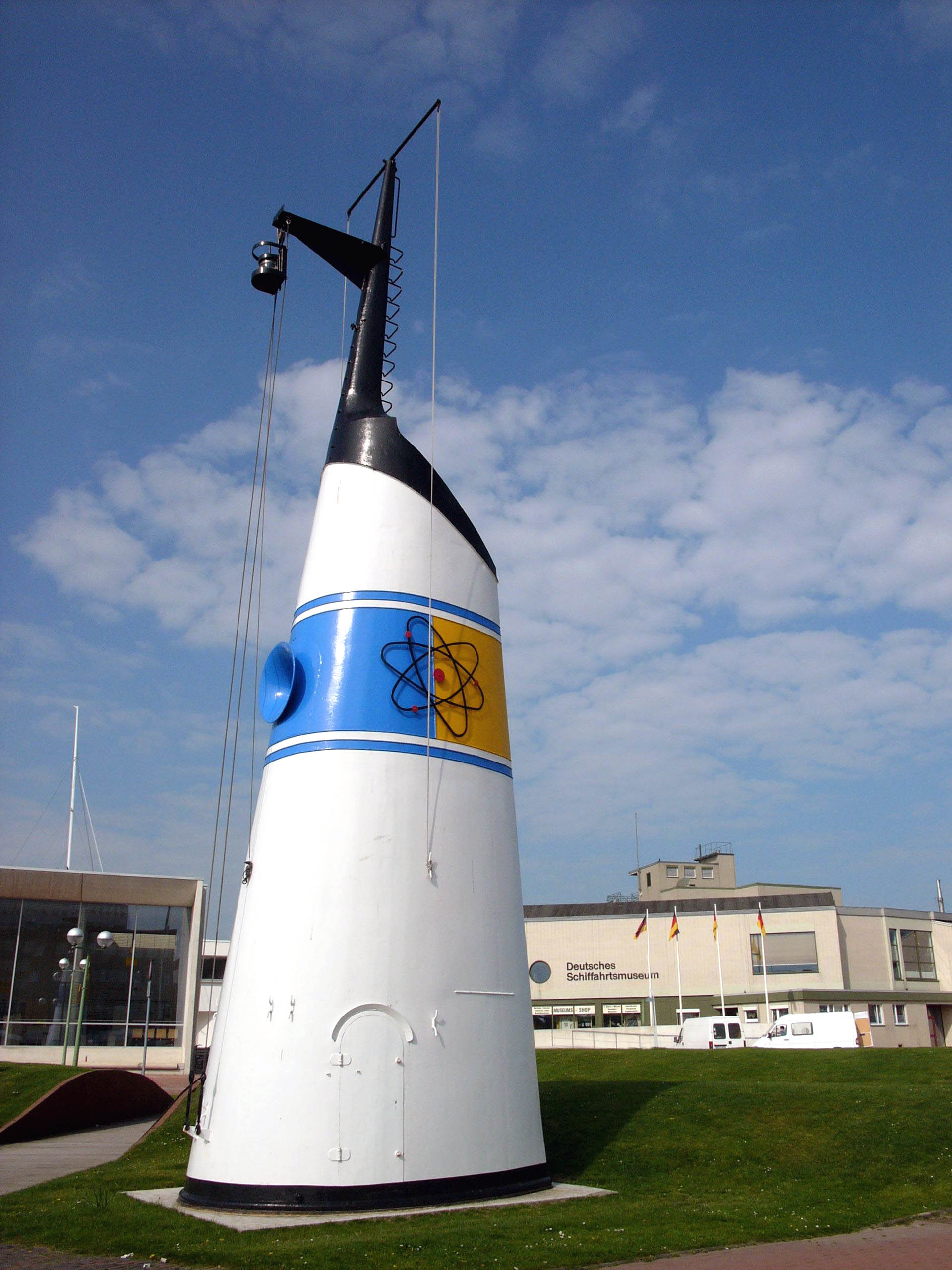
Funnel of Otto Hahn preserved at the German Maritime Museum in Bremerhaven

Otto Hahn was one of only four nuclear-powered cargo vessels built to date. Planning of a German-built trade and research vessel to test the feasibility of nuclear power in civil service began in 1960 under the supervision of German physicist Erich Bagge. Launched in 1964, her nuclear reactor was deactivated 15 years later in 1979 and replaced by a conventional diesel engine room. The ship was scrapped in 2009.

== History ==
Otto Hahn's keel was laid down in 1963 by Howaldtswerke Deutsche Werft of Kiel. She was launched in 1964 and named in honour of Professor Otto Hahn, the German chemist and Nobel Prize-winner, who discovered the nuclear fission of uranium in 1938. The first captain of the Otto Hahn was Heinrich Lehmann-Willenbrock, a German U-boat ace of World War II.

In 1968, the ship's 38-megawatt nuclear reactor was taken critical and sea trials began. In October of that year, NS Otto Hahn was certified for commercial freight transport and research.

Configured to carry passengers and ore, Otto Hahn made her first port call in Safi, Morocco, loading a cargo of phosphate ores, in 1970. In 1972, after four years of operation, her reactor was refuelled. She had covered 250,000 nautical miles (463,000 km) on 1.7 metric tons of low enriched uranium at 3.5 percent ^{235}U, similar to the fuel used in land-based nuclear power plants.

In 1979 Otto Hahn was deactivated. Her nuclear reactor and propulsion plant were removed and replaced by a conventional diesel engine room. In nine years, she had travelled 650,000 nautical miles (1,200,000 km) on nuclear power, visiting 33 ports in 22 countries, most of them only once with special permissions. She had never been allowed to use the Panama or Suez canals. The containment vessel of the nuclear reactor is stored at the Helmholtz-Zentrum Geesthacht and the nuclear fuel in the United States.

In 1983, Otto Hahn was recommissioned as the container ship Trophy and leased into commercial service. On 19 November, she was renamed Norasia Susan. She became the Norasia Helga in 1985, Hua Kang He in 1989, Anais in 1998, Tal in 1999, and finally Madre later that year. Her last owner, from 2006, was Liberian-based Domine Maritime Corporation, under the management of Alon Maritime Corporation of Athens, Greece. It was scrapped in Bangladesh in 2009.

Her original funnel is preserved at the German Maritime Museum in Bremerhaven.

== General characteristics ==
- Displacement 25,790 tons (26,200 t) full, 16,871 tons (17,141 t) standard
- Length: 164.3 m waterline, 172.0 m overall
- Beam: 23.4 m
- Freeboard: 5.3 m
- Capacity: 14,040 gross register tons (GRT) (39,760 m³)
- Propulsion: Nuclear drive
- Speed: 15.75 knots (29 km/h)
- Waterproof compartments: 14
- Loading spaces: 6
- Complement 63 crew, 35 research personnel maximum
- Reactor
  - Power: 38 MW
  - Volume: 35 m³
  - Pressure: 85 kp/cm² (8.3 MPa)
  - Temperature: 300 °C
  - Fuel: 1.7 metric tons of 3.5-6.6% low enriched uranium
  - Endurance under full load: 900 days
  - Average fuel burn-up: 23,000 MW·d/t
  - Average thermal neutron flux: 1.1×10^{13}/(cm²·s)
  - Number of elements/fuel rods: 12/2810
  - Equivalent minor diameter: 1050 mm
  - Active core height: 830 mm
  - Fuel rod diameter: 10.89 mm
  - Fuel cladding: 0.8 mm of Zircaloy-4
  - Manufacturer: Deutsche Babcock & Wilcox-Dampfkesselwerke und Internationale Atomreaktorbau GmbH

== Operation and research ==
The Otto Hahn was commissioned on 11 October 1969, and she was a research ship as its primary purpose. She contained cabins for the group of about 36 scientists. She also contained a conference room, a meeting room, and two laboratories. Her main purpose was to gain experience of future nuclear ships, which could be used for transport. As the Otto Hahn did not receive enough permissions from harbours, the experiments ended in 1979, 10 years after commissioning.

Until her decommissioning, the Otto Hahn visited 33 ports in 22 countries, most of them in South America and Africa. She did not receive permission to pass through the Suez Canal and her last journey was to Durban.

Her last captain was Ralf Matheisel.

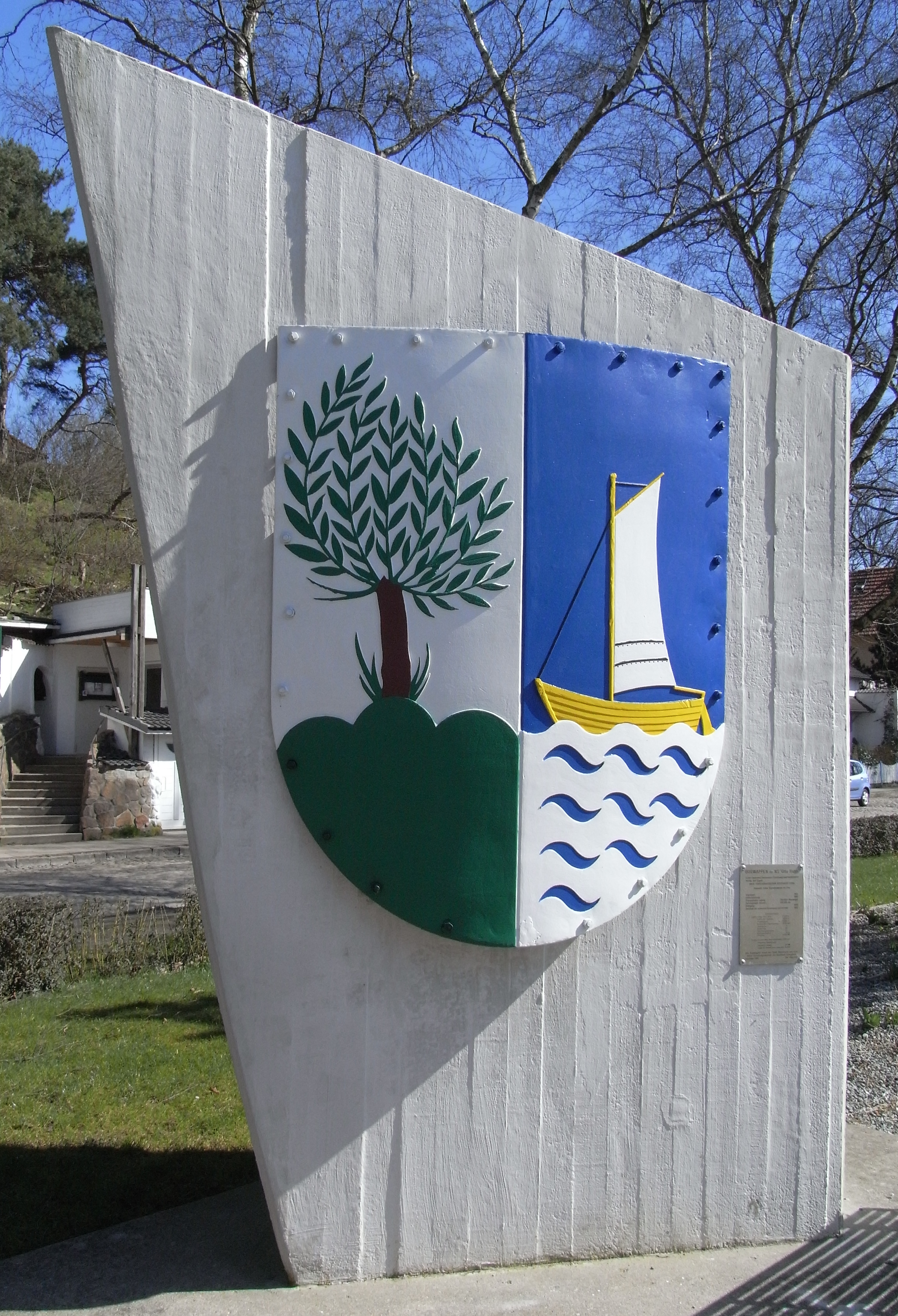
Shield of the Otto Hahn

== See also ==
- List of civilian nuclear ships
- Nuclear marine propulsion
- Der Abschied
