= Truck apron =

Region of a roundabout or slip lane which allows long vehicles to turn

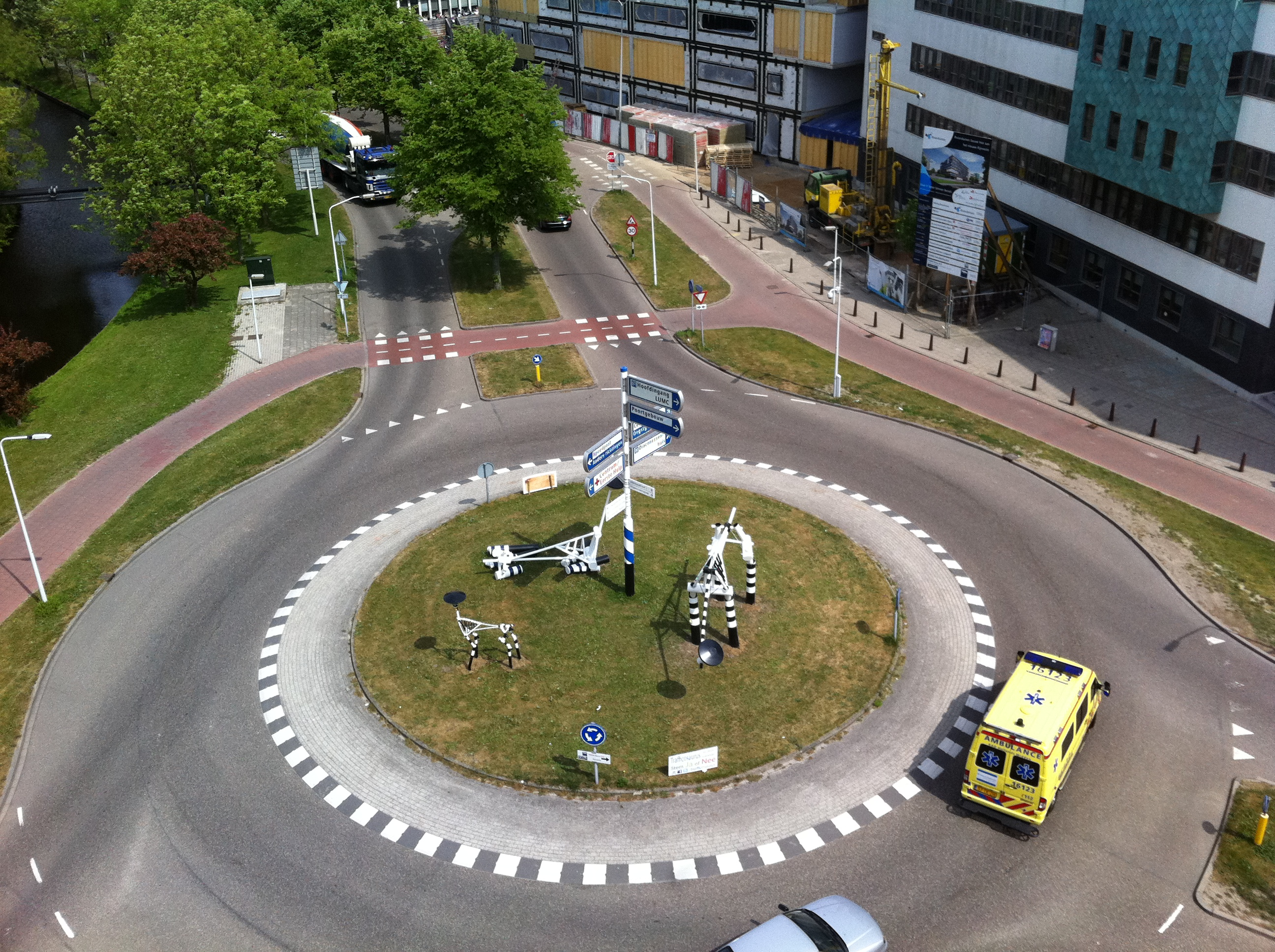
A roundabout with a truck apron in Leiden, the Netherlands.

Truck aprons are found at roundabouts and slip lanes. These allow large vehicles—trucks, buses, and recreational vehicles—to navigate the roundabout or turn without striking fixed objects or other road users.

== Truck apron construction ==
According to Alberta Transportation, "truck aprons are designed to support the weight of large trucks and help long vehicles turn safely through roundabouts. Truck aprons are between the road portion of the roundabout and the inner circle of the roundabout. On slip lanes, the truck apron is located between the road surface (bitumen) and the sidewalk. Both in roundabouts and slip lanes the truck apron is raised slightly, in an attempt to keep light vehicles on the main road surface. The truck apron is constructed of reinforced concrete. In many parts of North America planners, designers, and builders attempted to make truck aprons and roundabouts more attractive by stamping and colouring the concrete. From a distance the concrete looks like red paving stones.

== Roundabouts ==
Truck aprons are used on roundabouts and slip lanes to compensate for the off-tracking of larger vehicles. Off-tracking is the shorter path that the rear wheels follow as a vehicle moves around a corner. The longer the vehicle and the sharper the turn, the greater the deviation between the path of the front wheels and the rear wheels, or off-tracking. On some smaller roundabouts, the larger vehicle may have to proceed straight across the truck apron to safely navigate the roundabout.

== Slip lanes (turning lanes) ==
Truck aprons are used on slip lanes to compensate for a larger vehicle's off-tracking and reduce the points of conflict in an intersection. On smaller intersections or roundabouts, the truck apron allows for bigger right-turning vehicles to navigate the corner without the rear of the vehicle travelling over the sidewalk. By essentially widening the corner, the truck apron reduces the possibility of the rear portion of the vehicle driving over the sidewalk and striking a pedestrian or a fixed object. On larger multi-lane intersections, the truck apron reduces points of intersection between large right-turning vehicles and lanes of opposing traffic. By widening the slip lane via the truck apron, large right turning vehicles are able to turn directly into the right-hand lane of the road onto which the vehicle is turning. The trailer or rear of the vehicle will safely off-track into the truck apron.

== Design limitations ==
Owing to their decorative appearance of truck aprons many drivers of large vehicles are reluctant to use these for their intended purpose. In many cases, the stamped, coloured concrete looks like paving- or cobblestone. Pedestrians may mistake the truck apron for part of the sidewalk. Owing to this error of misinterpreting the truck apron as part of the sidewalk, there is a risk of pedestrians being struck by off-tracking trailers. Despite the conjecture, there is reduced chance of pedestrians using the truck apron as a sidewalk if there is a large vehicle approaching. Even when a truck apron is not present, most pedestrians will step back from the edge of the road when there is a large vehicle or semi-truck approaching for two reasons: to avoid the blast of air that accompanies large vehicles traveling at speed; because most people feel uncomfortable in close proximity to a large vehicle and will attempt to create distance by backing from the roadway as the vehicle approaches.
