= German Maritime Museum =

- Deutsches Schifffahrtsmuseum

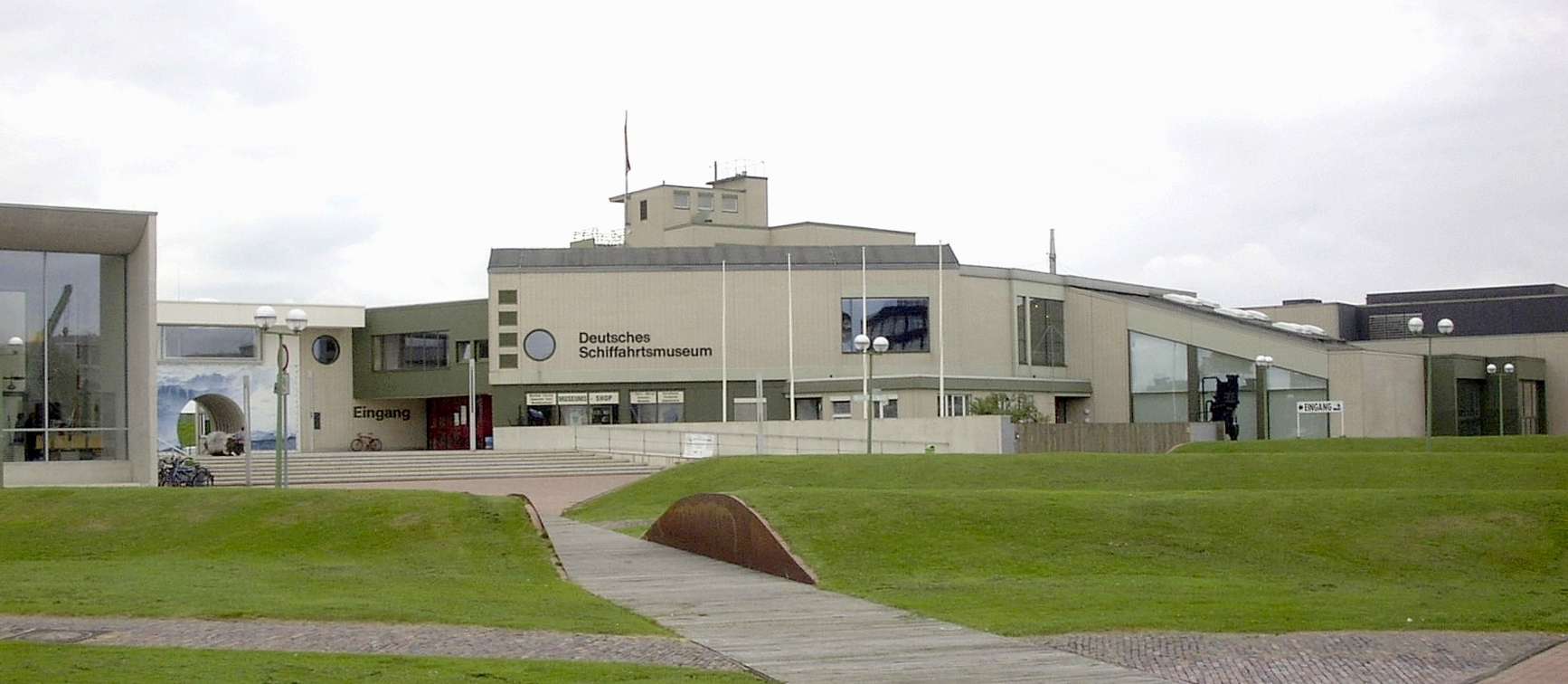
- The main museum building
- Established: September 1975
- Location: Bremerhaven, Germany
- Coordinates: 53°32′24″N 8°34′37″E
- Type: Maritime museum
- Owner: Bremerhaven
- Website: dsm.museum

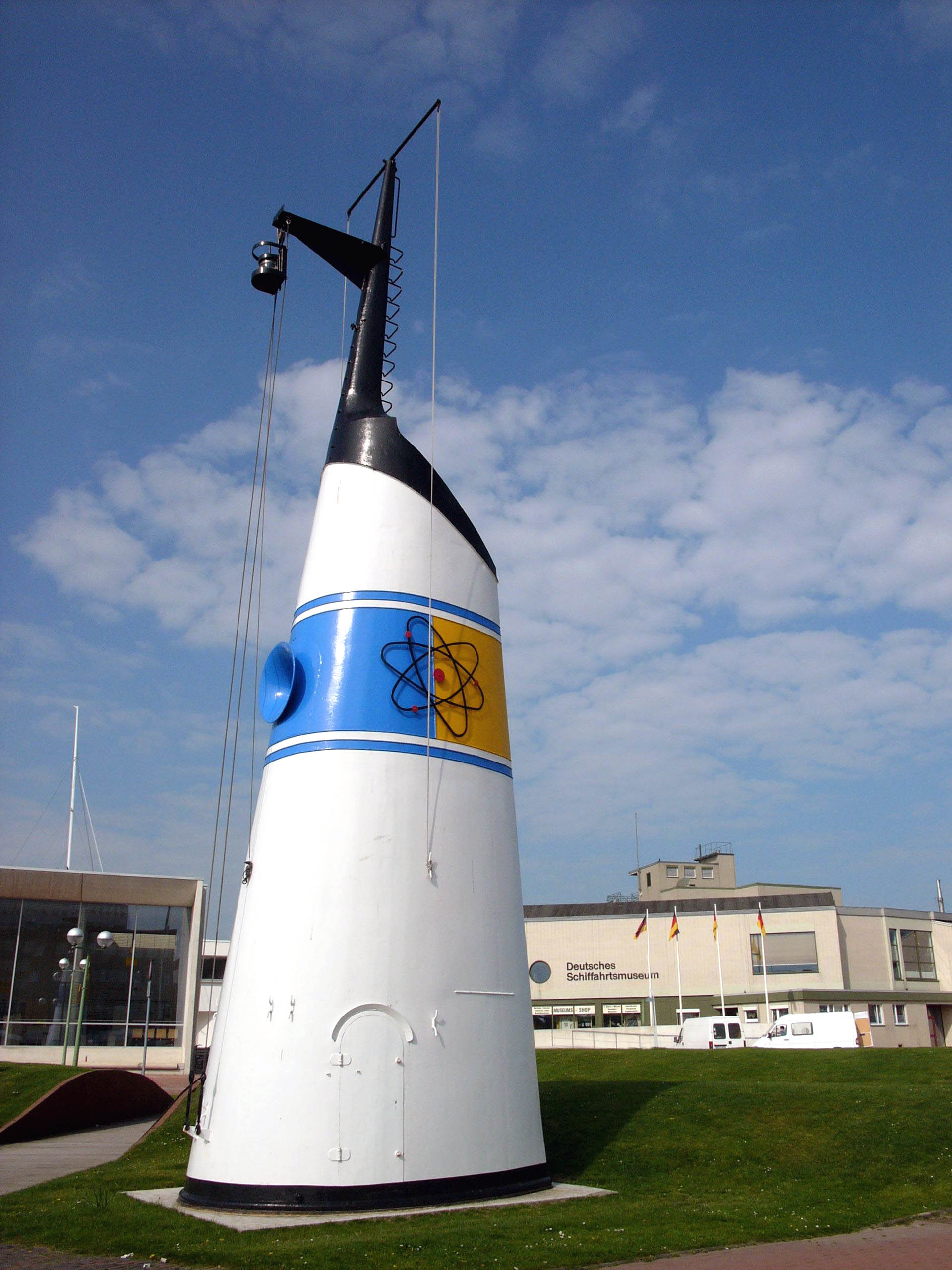
Funnel of Otto Hahn

The German Maritime Museum (German: Deutsches Schifffahrtsmuseum (DSM)) is a museum in Bremerhaven, Germany. It is part of the Gottfried Wilhelm Leibniz Scientific Community since 1980. The main museum building was opened on 5 September 1975 by then-president of Germany Walter Scheel, though scientific work had already started in 1971.

The museum consists of the building planned by Hans Scharoun as well as several museum ships in the Old Harbour of Bremerhaven, including the Seute Deern windjammer. The building and the 8 ships of the museum fleet, located between the Old Harbor and the Weser dike, as an ensemble, were placed under Bremen Cultural heritage management in 2005.

In 2000, at the 25th anniversary of the museum, the Hansekogge, a ship constructed around 1380 that was found in the Weser river in 1962, was presented to the public after having undergone a lengthy process of conservation in a large preservative-filled basin.

== History ==
The German Maritime Museum (DSM) was founded in Bremerhaven in 1971 to replace the Museum of Marine Science in Berlin, which had been destroyed during World War II. Its task is to collect, record, research, and present documents and artefacts about German maritime history. For this purpose, the DSM is equipped with laboratories and technical facilities for the examination, conservation and restoration of different types of water craft as well as other objects. It also houses a wide range of artefact collections and a dedicated archive and specialist library with an adjacent reading room. The DSM is the publisher of two periodicals as well as four scientific monograph series.

In 2024, the museums' buildings were restored. The federal government and the state governments of Bremen have spent € 42 million. The museums management said, this is too little to keep the museum and fleet running in the future.

== Research ==
DSM research is focused on the following fields:

- pre-industrial shipping in Central Europe
- German shipping in early modern times
- The impact of industrialisation on German commercial shipping
- the history of marine research
- man's use of the sea's resources through the ages

== Exhibitions ==
Permanent exhibitions at the DSM include:

- Central European shipping in the prehistoric, Roman, and medieval periods (with the Bremen cog of 1380 as the main exhibit).
- German shipping in early modern times (1500 to 1800).
- German shipping in the post-1800 industrial age (with the paddle-steamer "Meißen" of 1881 as main exhibit), military shipping (with the "Seehund" class submarine of 1945 as main exhibit), industrial ships' engines (with engines and reactor control panel of the nuclear-powered vessel Otto Hahn of 1968 as main exhibit).
- Shipping Channels (navigation, marine cartography, navigation marks, navigable waters).
- Outdoor museum port with coastal, inland, and sea vessels from 1867 to 1985, as well as cargo handling equipment, buoys, etc. Flagship is the world's largest preserved cargo sailing ship made of wood – the bark Seute Deern of 1919; it was announced in October 2019 that, in light of a survey which found that the ship is beyond repair, Seute Deern is to be broken up in situ.
- An extension opened in 2000 is home to the other sections – polar and marine research, whaling, deep-sea fishery, sea-rescue, as well as sailing as a sport and rowing.
- The Wilhelm Bauer, a sample of the Type XXI submarines operated by the Kriegsmarine for a short time near the end of WW II; this is the last fully intact, floating example of this class of craft.
