= Hanseatic Museum and Schøtstuene =

Coordinates: 60.3961°N 5.3262°E

- Det Hanseatiske Museum og Schøtstuene
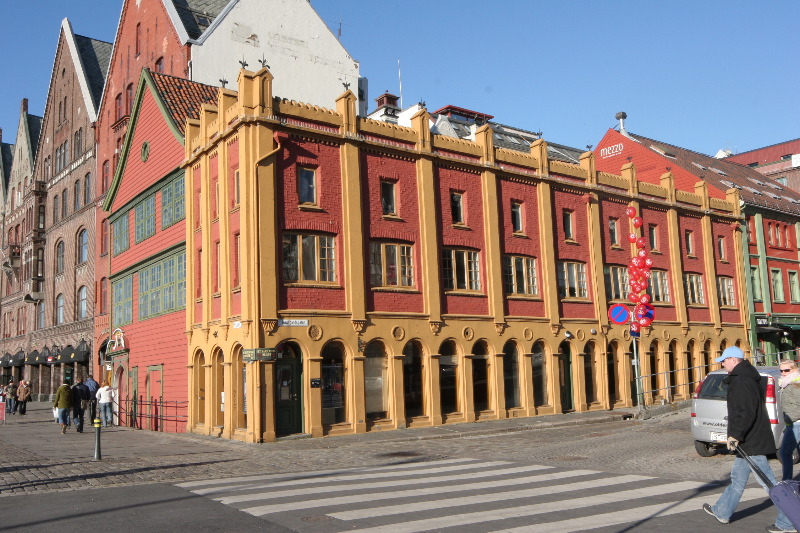
- Hanseatic Museum
- Established: 1872
- Location: Bergen, Norway
- Type: Museum
- Founder: J.W. Olsen

UNESCO World Heritage Site
- Criteria: Cultural: (iii)
- Designated: 1979 (3rd session)
- Part of: Bryggen
- Reference no.: 59-002

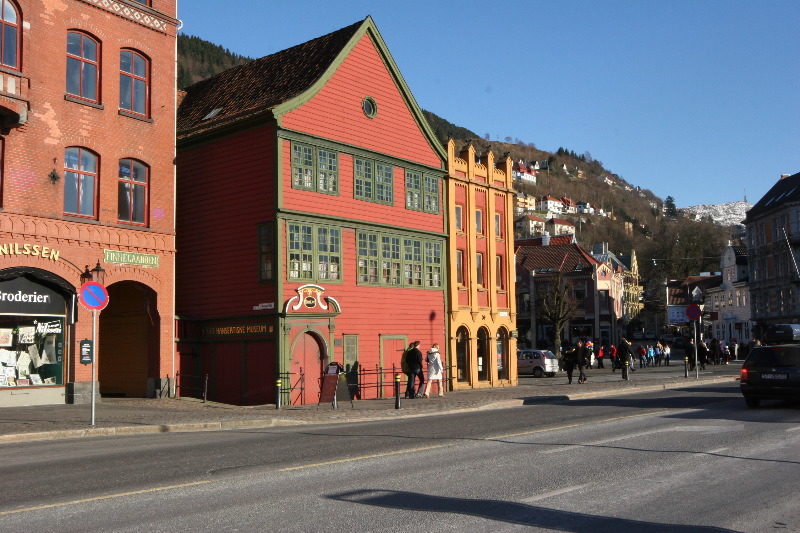
Hanseatic Museum in Finnegården

Hanseatic Museum and Schøtstuene (Det Hanseatiske Museum og Schøtstuene) is a museum in the city of Bergen, Norway.

== History ==
The main part of the museum is located in Finnegården, one of the conserved wooden buildings on Bryggen in Bergen, Norway. The museum covers the Hanseatic League period of time in Bergen. The German guild of merchants had created an overseas office at Bryggen by 1360. During the following four centuries, the site consisted of assembly halls for the Hanseatic merchants. It was forbidden to use fire in the other buildings on Bryggen, hence all cooking of food took place at Schøtstuene, for which the museum is also responsible

The present building was put up after a fire in 1702 when most of the city centre of Bergen burned down. The museum was started in a building owned by the merchant Johan Wilhelm Olsen in 1872. As the collection increased, another building, Murtasken, was constructed from a drawing by the architect Conrad Fredrik von der Lippe (1833–1901) . There is an authentic trading room in the museum including a merchant's office, sleeping places for the boys and a guestroom.

All the items in the museum are original and were initially collected from Bryggen or from various surrounding farms by Johan Wilhelm Wiberg (1829–98). His son, Christian Koren Wiberg (1870–1945) later built up the museum which became the responsibility of Bergen municipality in 1916.

== See also ==
- European Hansemuseum, in Lübeck

== Other sources ==
- Nedkvinte, Arnved (2013) The German Hansa and Bergen 1100-1600 (Cologne: Böhlau Verlag) ISBN 9783412216825
- Schulte Beerbühl, Margrit (2012) Networks of the Hanseatic League (University in Mainz: Leibniz Institute of European History)
- Trebbi, Marco (1996) Det Hanseatiske museum og Schøtstuene (Bergen: Schøtstuene) ISBN 8299079454
- Welle-Strand, Erling (1974) Museums in Norway (Oslo: Royal Ministry of Foreign Affairs) ISBN 8271770039
