= Cog (ship) =

Cargo ship of the Middle Ages

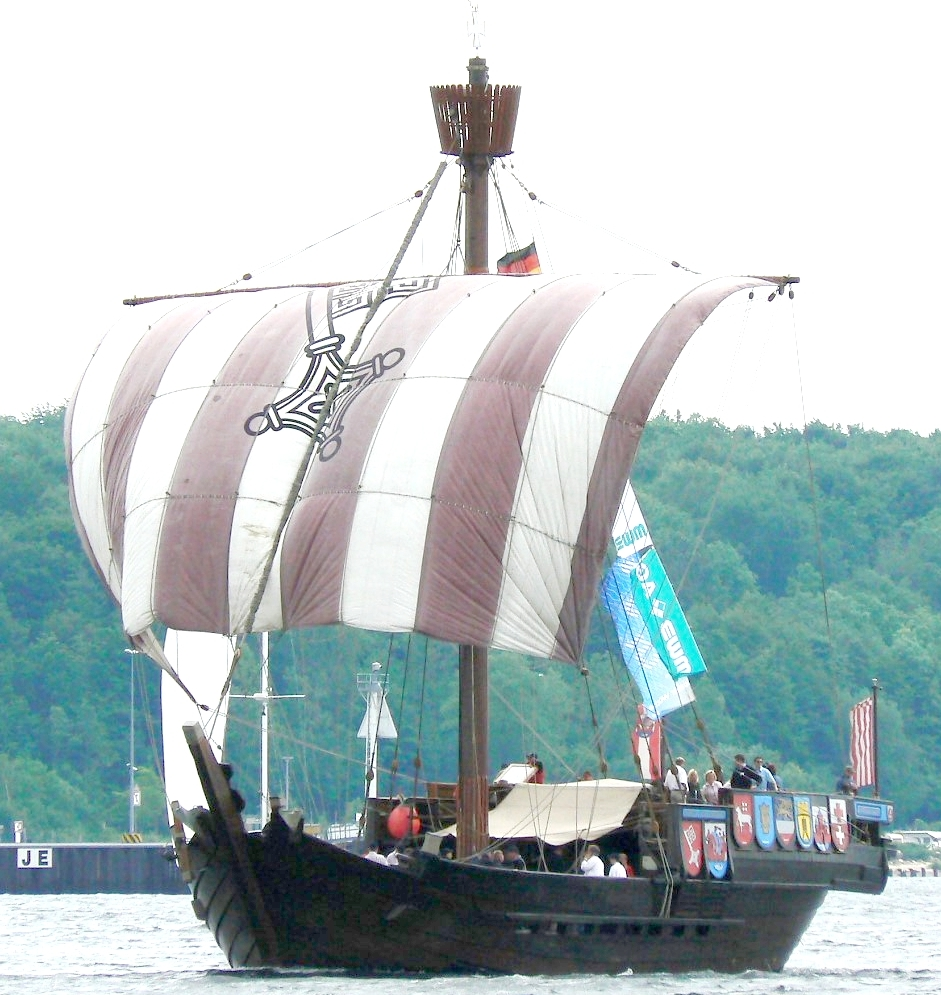
A replica of the Bremen cog

A cog is a type of ship used during the Middle Ages, mostly for trade and transport but also in war. It first appeared in the 10th century, and was widely used from around the 12th century onward. Cogs had clinker-built sides but a flush-planked bottom which was built shell-first. The timber used was, generally, oak. Cogs were fitted with a single mast and a single square sail. They were used primarily for trade in north-west medieval Europe, especially by the Hanseatic League. Typical seagoing cogs were from 15 to 25 metres (49 to 82 ft) long, 5 to 8 metres (16 to 26 ft) wide, and were of 30–200 tons burthen. Cogs were rarely as large as 300 tons, with a few considerably larger at over 1,000 tons.

Although the name cog is recorded as early as the 9th century, the seagoing vessel of that name seems to have evolved on the Frisian coast during the 12th century. Cogs progressively replaced Viking-type vessels such as knarrs in northern waters during the 13th century. Cogs could carry more cargo than knarrs of a similar size. Their flat bottoms allowed them to settle level in harbour, making them easier to load and unload. Their high sides made them more difficult to board in a sea fight, which made them safer from pirates.

== Description and construction ==
A comparison of clinker and carvel construction. Carvel frames are much heavier than clinker ribs.

Cogs were characterised by a flush-laid flat bottom at midships which gradually shifted to overlapped strakes near the posts. They were propelled by a single, large, rectangular sail. Typical seagoing cogs ranged from about 15 to 25 metres (49 to 82 ft) in length with a beam of 5 to 8 metres (16 to 26 ft) and were 40–200 tons burthen. Cogs were rarely as large as 300 tons, although a very small number were considerably larger, over 1,000 tons. A rule of thumb for crew size was that one sailor, exclusive of any dedicated fighting men, was required for every 10 tons burthen of the cog, although this may generate a suggested crew size on the low side of Medieval practice. Crews of up to 45 for civilian cogs are recorded, and 60 for a 240-ton cog being used for military transportation.

Stern-mounted rudder

Cogs were typically constructed largely of oak, and had full lapstrake, or clinker, planking covering their sides, generally starting from the bilge strakes, with double-clenched iron nails for plank fastenings. At the stem, chases are formed; that is, in each case, the land of the lower strake is tapered to a feather edge at the end of the strake where it meets the stem or stern-post. This allows the end of the strake to be fastened to the apron with the outside of the planking mutually flush at that point and flush with the stem. This means that the boat's passage through the water will not tend to lift the ends of the planking away from the stem. Before the next plank is fitted, the face of the land on the lower strake is bevelled to suit the angle at which the next strake will lie in relation with it. This varies all along the land. The new strake is held in position on the preceding one before the fastening is done.

The keel, or keel-plank, was only slightly thicker than the adjacent garboards and had no rabbet. Both stem and stern-posts were straight and rather long, and connected to the keel-plank through intermediate pieces called hooks. The lower plank hoods terminated in rabbets in the hooks and posts, but upper hoods were nailed to the exterior faces of the posts. Caulking was generally tarred moss that was inserted into curved grooves, covered with wooden laths, and secured by metal staples called sintels. The cog-built structure would be completed with a stern-mounted, hanging, central rudder on a heavy stern-post, which was a uniquely northern development. The single, thick, mast was set forward of amidships, stepped into the keel-plank and equipped with a single large, rectangular, square-rigged sail. The masts of larger vessels would be of composite construction. Complicated systems of rigging were developed to support the mast and to operate the sail. Cordage was usually hemp or flax (Note: Other materials were also used, for example walrus hide or human hair.) and the sail hemp-based canvas. From the 13th century cogs would be decked and larger vessels would be fitted with a stern castle, to afford more cargo space by keeping the crew and tiller up, out of the way; and to give the helmsman a better view.

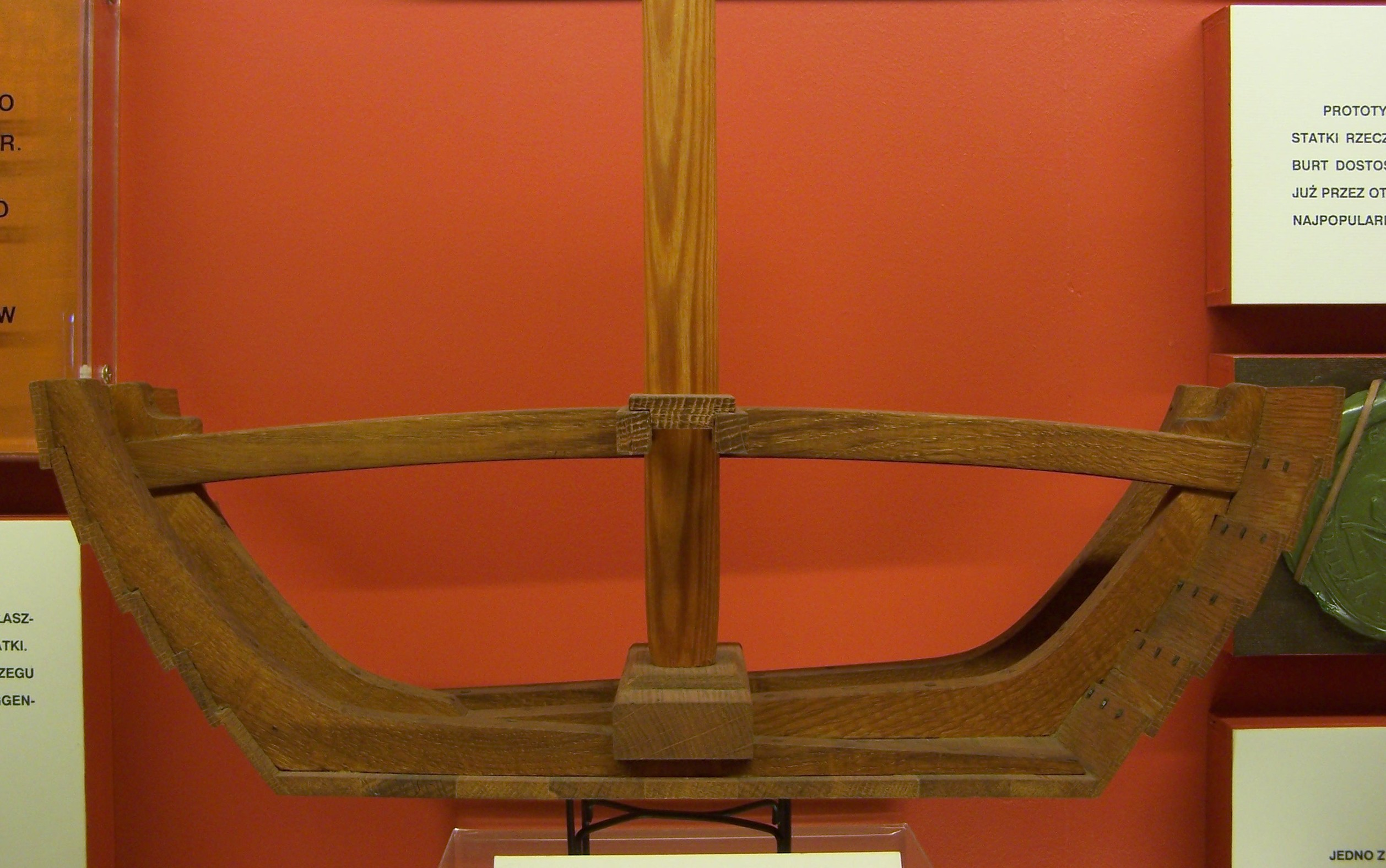
Cross-section of hull; note the lower mast stepped and braced

A cog, compared with the carvel-built vessels more traditional in the Mediterranean, was expensive and required specialist shipwrights. However, their simpler sail setup meant that cogs only required half the crew of similar-sized vessels equipped with lateen sails, as were common in the Mediterranean. A structural benefit of clinker construction is that it produces a vessel that can safely twist and flex around its long axis (running from bow to stern), which is an advantage in North Atlantic rollers, provided the vessel has a small overall displacement. A limitation of cogs is that they lack points to mount additional masts: at least some fore-and-aft sails are desirable for maneuverability but clinker-built cogs were effectively limited to a single sail. This made them unhandy, limiting their ability to tack in the harbour and making them very reliant on wind direction at the start of voyages. The flat bottom permitted cogs to be readily beached and unloaded at low tide when quays were not available; a useful trait when purpose-built jetties were not common. Cogs were expected to have a working life of approximately 40 years. (Note: In contrast, Mediterranean-type ships built contemporaneously in the French royal shipyard of Rouen had an anticipated life of three years in north European waters.)

== History ==
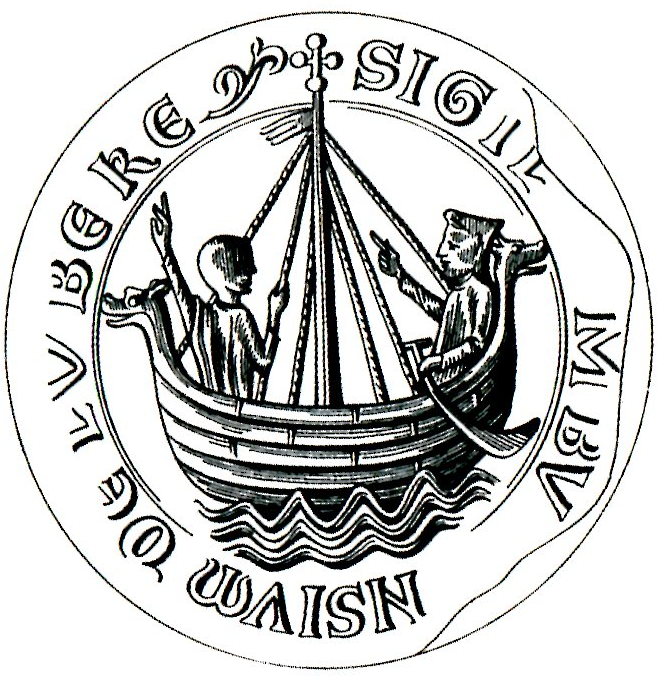
The 1223 seal of Lübeck, one of the leading cities of the Hanseatic League. It depicts an earlier form of cog with side rudder and curved stem and stern posts.

The earliest origins of the cog are believed to be logboats from around northern Germany. These developed into larger craft built in the same basic shape, but with planking instead of hollowed-out logs. Another development was into Kahnen, flat-bottomed boats, with pointed ends fore and aft that were constructed by splitting a hollowed-out log and widening the bottom with planks that were nailed to knee-shaped ribs attached to the sides. The pointed ends (called Block locally) of the log would be cut off and attached separately to the widened hull which resulted in so-called Blockkahnen, variants of which are still in use. The earliest evidence of a cog-like craft is a clay model found in Leese on the middle Weser from the grave of an adult male who died around 200 BC. Fragments of similar clay models have been found in nearby regions.

Trade from Germania in Roman times was mostly carried on Mediterranean-style sailing vessels and controlled by Roman merchants. After Roman power collapsed in the middle of the first millennium AD, transports on the large river estuaries and the sheltered waters of the Wadden Sea was taken over by Frisians who used vessels based on indigenous, flat-bottomed designs that were precursors of later medieval cogs. These had much lower sides than later cogs and would have been very similar to contemporary Scandinavian craft, such as knarrs. The oldest depiction of a vessel identified by contemporary sources as a cog is the Lübeck city seal from 1223. The early cogs were fitted with a side-mounted rudder oar that also functioned as a leeboard and was rigged with a single broad square sail that functioned similar to a lug sail.

Around 1200, the side rudder began to be replaced with a centerline rudder attached to a sternpost and developed in the typical medieval cog. Cogs could carry more cargo than knarrs; the rudder made steering easier than did the steering oar of the knarr, especially for larger vessels; and cogs were cheaper to build. The latter was due to the cog's use of sawn rather than split planks which was less wasteful. Fore and stern castles would later be added for defense against pirates, or to enable the use of these vessels as warships. The stern castle also afforded more cargo space below by keeping the crew and tiller up, out of the way.

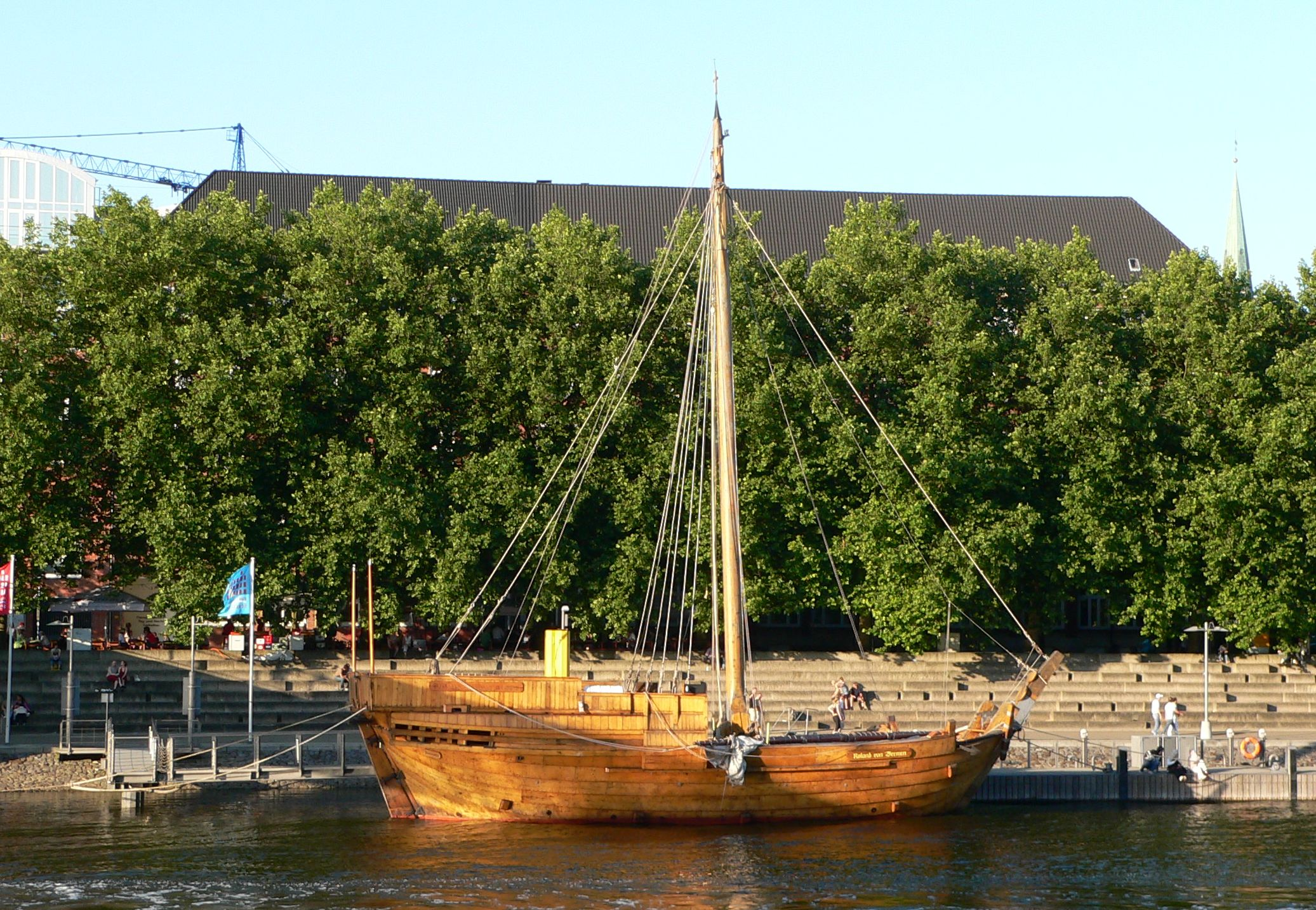
The reconstructed Roland von Bremen based on the wreck of a cog from around 1380

Current archaeological evidence points to the Frisian coast or Western Jutland as the possible birthplace of this type of vessel. The transformation of the cog into a true seagoing trader came not only during the time of the intense trade between West and East but also as a direct answer to the closure of the western entrance to the Limfjord. For centuries, the Limfjord in northern Jutland offered a fairly protected passage between the North Sea and the Baltic. Due to its unusual geographical conditions and strong currents, the passage was constantly filling with sand and was completely blocked by the early 12th century. This change produced new challenges. The larger ships, which could not be pulled across the sand bars, had to sail around the Jutland peninsula and circumnavigate the dangerous Cape Skagen to get to the Baltic. This resulted in major modifications to old ship structures, which can be observed by analyzing the evolution of the earliest cog finds of Kollerup, Skagen, and Kolding. This caused a boom in the number of small cogs, and the need for spacious and seaworthy ships led to the development of the cog as the workhorse of the Hanseatic League. It soon became the main cargo carrier in Atlantic and Baltic waters.

Eventually, around the 14th century, the cog reached its structural limits, and larger or more seaworthy vessels needed to be of a different type. This was the hulk, which already existed but was much less common than the cog. There is no evidence that hulks descended from cogs, but it is clear that a lot of technological ideas were adapted between the two types. The transition from cogs to hulks was not linear, according to some interpretations, both vessels coexisted for many centuries but followed diverse lines of evolution.

=== Archaeology ===
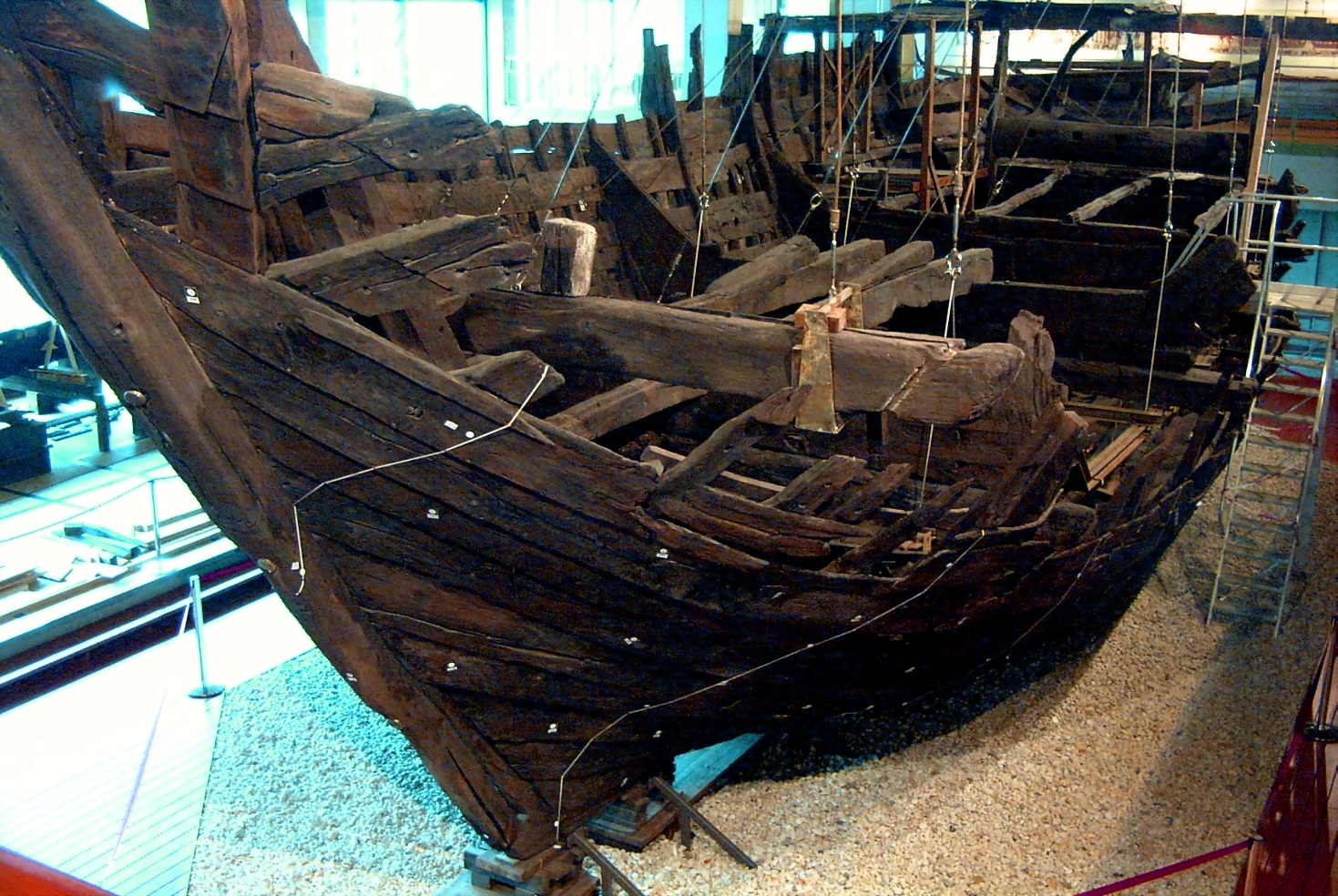
Reconstructed excavated cog from 1380 at Deutsches Schiffahrtsmuseum

The first archaeological find that was identified as a cog, was a ship wreck discovered in 1944 by P. J. R. Modderman in the Noordoostpolder near Emmeloord (plot NM 107). The wreck was reburied in situ and a 2008 re-excavation confirmed the interpretation as a cog. It was around 16 em long and its wood dated from 1339. The discovery by Modderman was however not well known in the literature.

The most famous cog in existence today is the Bremen cog. The artifact originates from the 1380s and was discovered in 1962. Prior to this discovery, the existence of cogs was primarily documented in medieval texts and seals. In 1990 the well-preserved remains of a Hanseatic cog were discovered in the estuary sediment of the Pärnu River in Estonia; the wreck has been dated to 1300. In 2012, a cog dating from the early 15th century was discovered preserved from the keel up to the decks in the silt of the River IJssel in the city of Kampen, Netherlands. During its excavation and recovery an intact brick dome oven and glazed tiles were found in the galley as well as a number of other artifacts.

In April 2022, the remains of a cog was found in Tallinn, Estonia during highway construction. It is believed to be better preserved than the Bremen cog. Initial dendrochronology tests dated the wood to 1298 but it was later found to have been felled in 1360. The ship is 24 metres long and nine metres wide. The boards are intact up to three metres from the bottom of the ship.

A major late medieval cog discovery was made in the Øresund off the coast of Copenhagen in late 2025. The wreck was located in a former shipping channel between Amager and Saltholm at a depth of approximately 13 m during underwater investigations related to maritime construction. Dendrochronological analysis dates the vessel to the early 15th century, around 1405–1415, and indicates that the timber used in its construction originated from both Pomerania and The Netherlands.

The ship measures approximately 28 m in length and about 9 m in beam, making it larger than any previously known cog and the largest example of the type yet identified archaeologically. Extensive sections of the hull were preserved beneath sand and silt, including clinker-built planking, frames, and internal structures. The wreck represents the only archaeological cog find with a preserved gunwale, and evidence for high castles at both bow and stern was identified, features previously known only from contemporary illustrations and seals.

No cargo was recovered from the site, but numerous crew belongings were found, including footwear, combs, rosary beads, cooking vessels, and other domestic items. Together with the remains of a brick-built galley installation with glazed tiles.

== See also ==
- FC Hansa Rostock
- Medieval ships
- Tallinn shipwrecks, a cog and a hulk from the 14th century discovered in 2022.

== Citations ==
=== Sources ===
- Bachrach, Bernard S.; Bachrach, David S. (2017). Warfare in Medieval Europe c.400 – c.1453. Abingdon, Oxon: Routledge. ISBN 978-1138887664.
- Bass, George F. (1972). A History of Seafaring: Based on Underwater Archaeology. Thames and Hudson. ISBN 0-500-01077-3.
- Crumlin-Pedersen, Ole (2000). "To be or not to be a Cog: the Bremen Cog in Perspective". International Journal of Nautical Archaeology. 29 (2): 230–246. Bibcode:2000IJNAr..29..230C. doi:10.1111/j.1095-9270.2000.tb01454.x. S2CID 162832227.
- Cushway, Graham (2011). Edward III and the War at Sea: The English Navy, 1327-1377. Woodbridge, Suffolk: Boydell Press. ISBN 978-1843836216.
- Friel, Ian (1994). "Winds of Change? Ships and the Hundred Years War". In Curry, Anne (ed.). Arms, Armies, and Fortifications in the Hundred Years War. Woodbridge, Suffolk: Boydell Press. pp. 183–194. ISBN 0-85115-365-8.
- Gardiner, Robert; Unger, Richard W., eds. (1994). Cogs, Caravels and Galleons: The Sailing Ship, 1000-1650. Conway's History of the Ship. London: Conway Maritime Press. ISBN 978-0851775609.
- Hutchinson, Gillian (1994). Medieval Ships and Shipping. Cranbury, NJ: Associated University Presses. ISBN 9780718501174.
- van Holk, Andre F. L. (2010). "Maritieme archeologie van de kogge" [Maritime archaeology of the cog]. In Brand, Hanno; Egge, Knol (eds.). Koggen, kooplieden en kantoren: de Hanze, een praktisch netwerk [Cogs, merchants and offices: the Hanse, a practical network] (hardcover) (in Dutch) (1st ed.). Hilversum & Groningen: Uitgeverij Verloren & Groninger Museum. ISBN 978-90-8704-165-6.
- Lambert, Craig (2011). Shipping the Medieval Military: English Maritime Logistics in the Fourteenth Century. Warfare in History. Vol. 34. Woodbridge, Suffolk: Boydell Press. ISBN 978-1843836544.
- McGrail, Sean (1981). Rafts, Boats and Ships. London: National Maritime Museum. ISBN 0-11-290312-6.
- Prestwich, Michael (2007) [2005]. Plantagenet England 1225–1360. Oxford: Oxford University Press. ISBN 978-0199226870.
- Rodger, Nicholas A. M. (2004). The Safeguard of the Sea. London: Penguin. ISBN 978-0140297249.
- Rose, Susan (1997). "Battle of Sluys". In Grove, E. (ed.). Great Battles of the Royal Navy: As Commemorated in the Gunroom, Britannia Royal Naval College, Dartmouth (illustrated [some in colour] ed.). London: Arms and Armour Press. ISBN 978-1854094179.
- Rose, Susan (2001). Medieval Naval Warfare 1000-1500. New York: Routledge. ISBN 978-1134553105.
- Runyan, Timothy (1994). "Cog as Warship". In Gardiner, Robert; Unger, Richard W (eds.). Cogs, Caravels and Galleons: the Sailing Ship from 1000–1650. Conway's History of the Ship. London: Conway Maritime Press. pp. 47–58. ISBN 978-0851775609. OCLC 932458210.
- Runyan, Timothy (2003). Hattendorf, John B.; Unger, Richard W. (eds.). War at Sea in the Middle Ages and the Renaissance. Warfare in History. Vol. 14. Woodbridge, Suffolk; Rochester, New York: Boydell Press. pp. 53–68. ISBN 978-0851159034.
- Sumption, Jonathan (1990). Trial by Battle. The Hundred Years' War. Vol. I. London: Faber and Faber. ISBN 978-0571200955.
