= Battle of Kolding =

The Battle of Kolding can refer to:

- Battle of Kolding (1644), a battle between Sweden and Denmark during the Torstenson War
- Battle of Kolding (1658), a battle between Sweden vs. Poland and Denmark during the Northern Wars
- Battle of Kolding (1849), a battle between Denmark and the German Confederation during the First Schleswig War
