= Sternpost =

Vertical structure at the aft of a boat

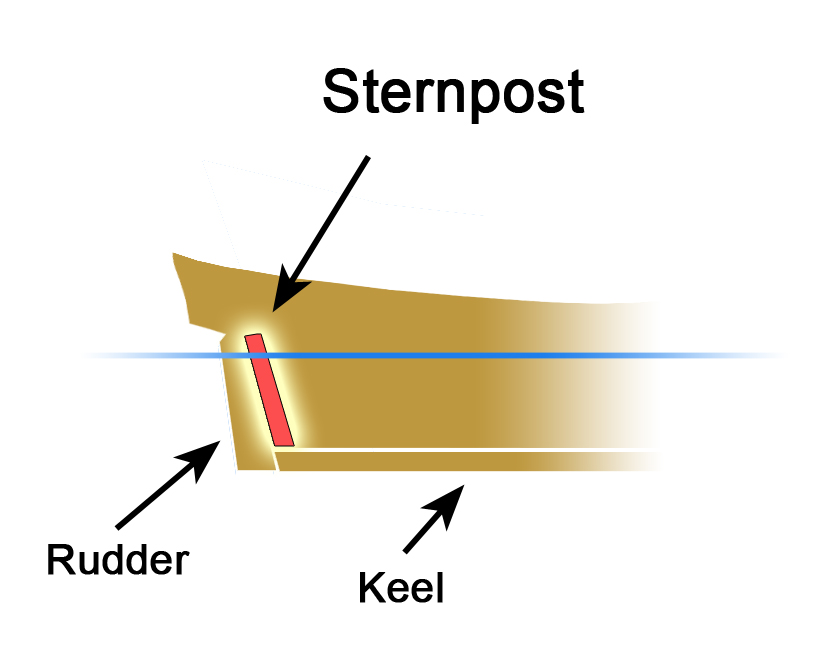
Side elevation of a sailing ship with the sternpost highlighted

A sternpost is the upright structural member or post at the aft end of a ship or a boat, to which are attached the transoms and the rearmost part of the stern.

The sternpost may either be completely vertical or may be tilted or "raked" slightly aft. It rests on or "fays to" the ship's keel.

Traditionally, the rudder was suspended from the sternpost, and the propellers descended from it. With changes in how these are positioned, in modern shipbuilding vessels are often not considered to have a sternpost.

== See also ==
- Boat building
- Shipbuilding
