= William Reynbald =

16th-century English politician

William Reynbald (by 1488 – 1556), of Ipswich, Suffolk, was an English merchant and politician. He was a Member of Parliament (MP) for Ipswich in 1545.

Reynbald settled in Ipswich after leaving Norwich, where his brother was a grocer. He was active in Ipswich Corporation as a portman from 1537, and later as a bailiff or justice of the peace.

Parliament of the United Kingdom
Preceded by Ralph Goodwin and John Sparrow	Member of Parliament for Ipswich; 1545–1547; With: Richard Smart	Succeeded by John Gosnold and John Smith alias Dyer
