= William Sabine =

16th-century English politician

Member of Parliament for Ipswich
- In office 1539-1542 Serving with Robert Daundy

Personal details
- Born: By 1491
- Died: 11 April 1543
- Military career
- Allegiance: United Kingdom
- Branch: Navy
- Rank: Serjeant-at-arms
- Units: The Sabyne; The Less Bark
- Conflicts: Battle of Flodden Field

William Sabine, also Sabyn or Sabyan (by 1491 – 11 April 1543), of Ipswich, Suffolk, was an English merchant, ship-owner, naval sea-captain and municipal figure. He was a Member of Parliament (MP) for Ipswich in 1539, with Edmund Daundy.

== Naval career ==
William was the son of John Sabyn, or Sabyan, Esq., who in 1516 received a life pension of a shilling a day for being in arms in the king's service. He had an only sister and coheir to his father, named Elizabeth Sabyn.

During his father's lifetime William came to hold a position of importance as a captain in the Royal Navy. At the onset of King Henry's war with France, in April to July 1512 Sabyn commanded a ship of 120 tonnes bearing his own name, The Sabyne, carrying 60 soldiers, 34 mariners, and 4 gunners with 2 servitors.

In April 1513 he was sent with despatches to the King from Admiral Howard and returned to the fleet at Brest just too late to prevent or join the celebrated engagement in which the Admiral was killed. These events he described in a letter to Thomas Wolsey while under sail on 30 April. Sabyn related that the attack was not conducted as he would have advised, and that "now we be bodys withowte a hed". With "the king's army royal now on the sea", he was captain, and John Jermy the master, of The Less Bark (of 240 tons, carrying 193 men). In August of 1513 he is again listed as captain on The Sabyn, with 101 men, among the hired ships. In September 1513 he was present at the Battle of Flodden Field.

During the winter of 1513-1514 he was appointed to cruise between Dover and Calais: payments show that he had 40 soldiers, 55 mariners and 5 gunners. In January 1515 he was in command of the King's ships ordered to the Firth, in support of Margaret Tudor, King Henry's sister. He is described as "Vice-admiral" when a list was drawn up of the men mustered in four of the king's ships under him in Grimsby Roads in 1516. In November 1517, while upon the French coast, he became involved in a dispute with the French commanders on the subject of piracy, but eventually, on the production of the king's warrant, obtained restitution of a royal vessel called The Black Barke. On Oct 20 1518 he was appointed one of the king's Serjeants-at-arms, with a salary of 12d a day.

In 1522 he was again in northern seas, whence, writing to the Earl of Surrey, Lord Admiral, on coming into Skate Road, 10 May 1522, he says that he had fired into Leith and Kinghorn, and after attacking a ship at anchor, which was rescued by the country people, had captured a ship of Copenhagen, laden with rye, which his servant was to repair and bring to Ipswich. He added that if he had had two good ships to land 500 men, he would have burnt half-a-dozen villages. A few days after, on his homeward voyage, he chased a Spaniard, and next two French vessels off Orford Ness, finally putting into Orwell Haven, where he had left his boat. In the succeeding month he accompanied the admiral to Dartmouth, and assisted him in the selection of a harbour in which to lay the great ships for the winter.

== Ipswich townsman ==
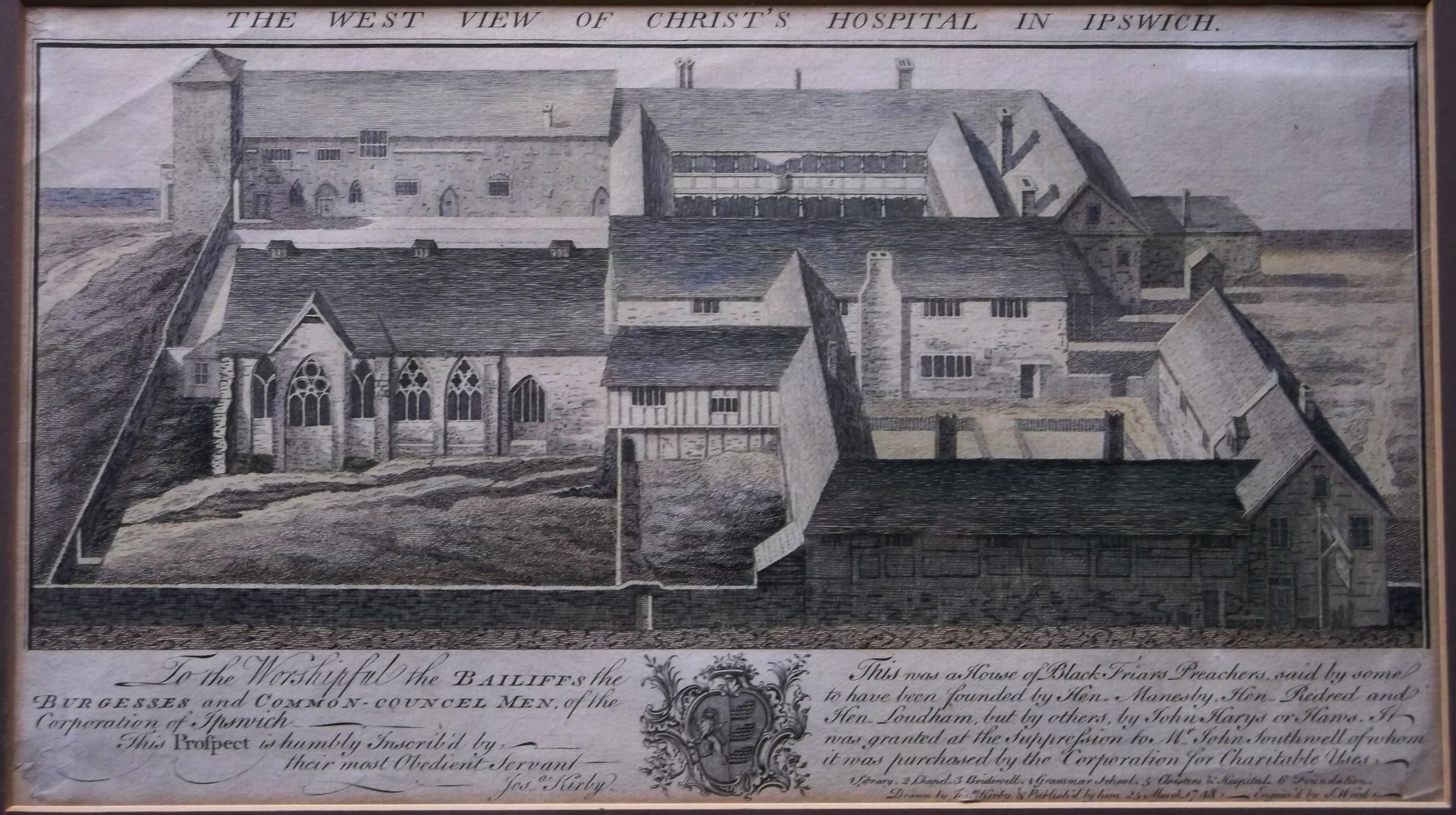
Conventual buildings of Ipswich Blackfriars (sold to Sabyn in 1541) as they appeared to Joshua Kirby in 1748.

Sabyn was admitted a freeman of Ipswich in 1519, and in August 1527 acted swiftly to win the appointment as successor to Sir Edward Echyngham in the controllership of the Ipswich customs. He served as one of the two Bailiffs elected annually to the Assembly of Ipswich in 1536-1537 and in 1539-1540, in conjunction with which he held justiciary powers: in 1537 he was elected an Ipswich Portman, under proviso that he obtain the king's license to occupy the office, which he held until his death. As a municipal leader in the town he was also its representative in Parliament in 1539, perhaps assisted by his association with Sir Ralph Sadler, whom he named supervisor of his probate.

During this period he cooperated with various other merchants, of whom the most prominent was Henry Tooley, founder of the town's almshouses in Foundation Street. Upon the suppression of the Ipswich Blackfriars monastery in 1538, the site and conventual buildings were at first leased to Sabyn (who had premises adjacent), and were finally sold to him in November 1541, to hold in chief for the twentieth part of a Knight's fee. In his will written in 1542 he refers to them as "my house and mansion place late called the blak ffreres in Ippiswiche"; the will also shows that he owned various premises and tenantries in the town, and in Mendlesham and Stowmarket, and also two tenements in the University of Cambridge opening against the Cambridge market, one occupied by Master Hacher and one by Mistress Cheeke. His ship, the James of Ipswich, was to be kept working after his death until it was sold. His tenures of various quays in the neighbourhood of St Mary Key are listed in a Rental of 1542.

== Legacy ==
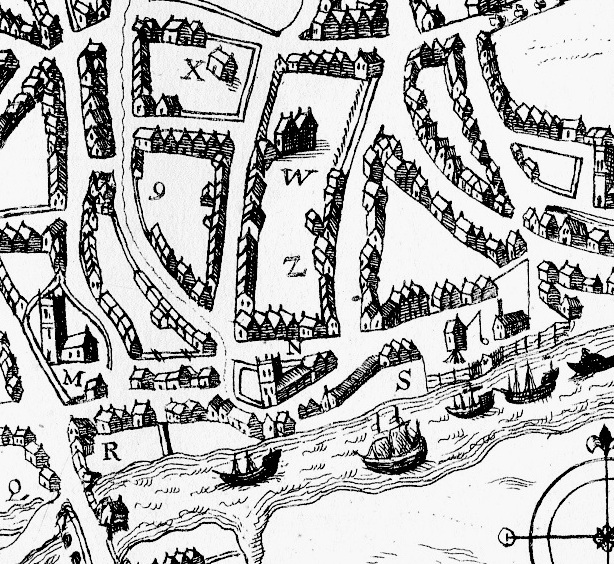
Site of Ipswich Blackfriars (W) in relation to St Mary-at-Key (N) and St Peter's (M), after John Speed (1610).

William Sabyn bore arms, Sable three bees [or flies] or, two and one, which appeared carved in stone, and in glass, in the church of St Mary Key, or at the Quay, Ipswich. In his will Sabyn requested burial in this church in the chapel where his first wife was buried. St Mary Key stands between the former curtilage of the Blackfriars and the historic quay of Ipswich: Henry Tooley's grave and monument were in the same church.

Sabyn had two wives, first Alice ("Alse"), who was living in 1518, and secondly Margaret (the widow of John Cole), who survived to have a third marriage to Thomas Maria Wingfield, son of Sir Richard Wingfield. Sabyn's principal heir male was William Attwood of Aspall, Suffolk, son of Reynolde Attwood of London, son of William Attwood of Staughton (Bedfordshire) and Elizabeth Sabyan (William's sister). Thomas Attwood alias Smythe (brother of Reynolde), and his son Sabyn Attwood, were also beneficiaries of his will.

The principal executor was William West "otherwise Sabyn", whom Sabyn called his godson, probably the same man who became a bailiff of Ipswich in 1550 and 1556. West may also have been working for Henry Tooley in the early 1520s. Within weeks of Sabyn's death William Atwood brought a plea against William West claiming that his own grandmother Elizabeth (now Danvers) was in league with his uncle Thomas Smythe to disinherit him.

Parliament of England
Preceded by ? ?	Member of Parliament for Ipswich; 1539-1542; With: Robert Daundy	Succeeded by Ralph Goodwin; John Sparrow
