= Thomas Hall (MP for Ipswich) =

English politician

Thomas Hall (by 1475 – 1511 or 1519), of Ipswich, Suffolk, was an English politician.

== Family ==
Hall is thought to have been a younger son of Thomas Hall of Coggeshall, Essex. He was outlived by his wife, Elizabeth, née Fairfax, and son Thomas. He is not mentioned after 1511, and was definitely dead by 1519.

== Career ==
He was a member of parliament (MP) for Ipswich in 1510.

In January 1511, Hall was sent to the Fleet for stating that Catherine of Aragon, then queen, the first wife of Henry VIII, had been 'delivered of a knave child'. This may explain why he seems to have not been involved in public life after this point.

Parliament of England
Unknown	Member of Parliament for Ipswich; 1510; With: William Spencer	Succeeded by Thomas Baldry with Edmund Daundy
