= John Gosnold =

16th-century English politician

John Gosnold (by 1507 – 1554), of Otley, Suffolk and London, was an English lawyer and politician. He was a Member of Parliament (MP) for Ipswich in 1547 and in October 1553.

== Early life ==
John was the son of Robert Gosnold and Agnes daughter of Agnes, of John Hill.

== Legal career ==
He trained as a lawyer being admitted to Gray's Inn in 1526 and was called to the bar in 1528. In 1532 his legal services were engaged by Thomas Wentworth, 1st Baron Wentworth.

== Family life ==
He married Katherine, the daughter of Sir Thomas Blennerhasset.

Parliament of the United Kingdom
Preceded by William Reynball and Richard Smart	Member of Parliament for Ipswich; 1547–1553 (Mar); With: John Smith alias Dyer	Succeeded by John Smith alias Dyer and Richard Bryde
