= Daundy =

Daundy is a surname. Notable people with the surname include:

- Robert Daundy (by 1500–1558), English businessman and politician
- Edmund Daundy (by 1468–1515), English politician and merchant
- Joan Daundy, mother of Thomas Wolsey

== See also ==
- Dandy (surname)
