= Felbrigg (disambiguation) =

Felbrigg is a village in England.

Felbrigg may also refer to:

- Thomas Wyndham of Felbrigg, a see captain
- John Felbrigg, MP for Ipswich (UK Parliament constituency)
