= William Debenham (disambiguation) =

William Debenham (1794–1863) was the founder of Debenhams the retailer.

William Debenham may also refer to:

- William Debenham the elder, MP for Ipswich in 1397
- William Debenham the younger, MP for Ipswich in 1414–1437
