= Richard Church =

Richard Church may refer to:

- Richard Church (general) (1784–1873), Irish military officer in the British and Greek army
- Richard William Church (1815–1890), nephew of the general, Dean of St Paul's
- Richard Church (poet) (1893–1972), English poet and man of letters
- Richard Church (MP), Member of Parliament (MP) for Ipswich in 1402
