= William Cage (MP for Ipswich) =

English politician

William Cage (died 4 November 1645) was an English politician who sat in the House of Commons variously between 1614 and 1645. He supported the Parliamentary side in the English Civil War.

Cage was the eldest son of Edward Cage of Ipswich (d. 1607) and his wife Beatrix (d. 1631), previously the wife of Thomas Wood. He was a portman of Ipswich and seven times bailiff of the Ipswich Corporation.

Cage was elected Member of Parliament for Ipswich in 1614, 1621, 1624, 1625 and 1626.

Elected again in 1628, he held the seat until 1629 when King Charles decided to rule for eleven years without parliament. He was then re-elected for the Short Parliament in April 1640 and the Long Parliament in November 1640, holding the seat until his death.

Cage had a country house at Burstall, Suffolk with an estate considered at about £300 per annum. He was "reputed a wise man". He died in 1645 and was buried in the church at Burstall.

Cage's daughter Elizabeth married Thomas Blosse and their son Thomas inherited the estate at Burstall.

Parliament of England
Preceded by Sir Henry Glenham; Sir Francis Bacon	Member of Parliament for Ipswich; 1614–1629; With: Sir Robert Snelling 1614–1627; Edmund Day 1628–1629	Parliament suspended until 1640
Parliament suspended since 1629	Member of Parliament for Ipswich; 1640–1645; With: John Gurdon	Succeeded by John Gurdon; Francis Bacon
