= Sir John Barker, 4th Baronet =

17th-century English politician

Sir John Barker, 4th Baronet (1655 – 14 August 1696) was an English baronet and Tory politician.

He was the second son of Sir John Barker, 2nd Baronet and Winifred Parker, daughter of Sir Philip Parker. In 1665, he succeeded his older brother Jeremy as baronet. Barker was educated at Merton College, Oxford.

In 1680, he entered the British House of Commons and sat as Member of Parliament (MP) for Ipswich until his death in 1696.

Barker married Bridget Bacon, daughter of Sir Nicholas Bacon. They had a daughter and a son. Barker was succeeded in the baronetcy by his only son William, who sat in the House of Commons between 1708 and 1731.

Parliament of England
Preceded by John Wright; Gilbert Lindfield	Member of Parliament for Ipswich; 1680–1696; With: John Wright 1680–1685; Sir Nicholas Bacon 1685–1689; Peyton Ventris 1689; Sir Charles Blois 1689–1695; Charles Whitaker 1695–1696	Succeeded by Charles Whitaker; Richard Phillips
Baronetage of England
Preceded by Jeremy Barker	Baronet (of Grimston Hall); 1665–1696	Succeeded by William Barker
