= Joseph Martin (MP for Ipswich) =

Joseph Martin (c. 1649 – 16 August 1729) was a London merchant and politician who sat in the English House of Commons in 1701 and British House of Commons from 1710 to 1715.

Martin was born about 1649 and became a merchant trading primarily with the Baltic, although he was also a member of the Levant Company and of the New East India Company.

In 1701 Martin was briefly MP for Ipswich before acting as a consul in Moscow from 1702 to 1705. He was returned as MP for Hastings in 1710 but was defeated in 1715 and did not stand for parliament again. From 1710 to 1715, he was a director of the South Sea Company. He was knighted on 22 July 1712 and was Commissary for commercial negotiations with France from 1713 to 1715.

Martin died on 16 August 1729, aged 80. He had married and had 3 sons and 3 daughters.

Parliament of Great Britain
Preceded by John Pulteney; John Ashburnham	Member of Parliament for Hastings; 1710–1715; With: Sir William Ashburnham	Succeeded by Archibald Hutcheson; Henry Pelham
Parliament of England
Preceded by Sir Samuel Barnardiston; Richard Phillips	Member of Parliament for Ipswich; 1701–1701; With: Sir Charles Duncombe	Succeeded by Charles Whitaker; Richard Phillips
