= John Starling =

John Starling may refer to:

- John Starling (MP), MP for Ipswich, 1402–1413, son of Geoffrey Starling
- John Henry Starling (1883–1966), Australian public servant
- John Starling (musician), American bluegrass musician
