= Charles Whitaker =

Charles Whitaker (c. 1642–1715) was twice M.P. for Ipswich, firstly between October 1695 and November 1696, and later between 1701 and 1702. He sat as a Whig

Parliament of England
| Preceded by Sir Charles Blois and Sir John Barker | Member of Parliament for Ipswich; 1695–1696; With: Sir John Barker; Richard Phillips | Succeeded by Sir Samuel Barnardiston with Richard Phillips |
| Preceded by Joseph Martin and Sir Charles Duncombe | Member of Parliament for Ipswich; 1701–1702; With: Richard Phillips; John Bence | Succeeded by Henry Poley and John Bence |
