= Edmund Day =

Edmund Day may refer to:

- Edmund Day (politician), member of parliament for Ipswich in the English parliament of 1628
- Edmund Ezra Day (1883–1951), American educator
