= Geoffrey Starling =

English politician

Geoffrey Starling (fl. 1377–1395) was an English Member of Parliament.

== Life ==
Starling was the son of Geoffrey Starling of Ipswich. Geoffrey married, before June 1384, Margaret, and they had a son, John Starling, MP for Ipswich.

== Career ==
Starling was a Member of Parliament for Ipswich in January 1377, 1381, May 1382, October 1382, February 1383, October 1383, 1386, February 1388, January 1390, 1391, 1393 and 1395.
