= Richard Smart =

Richard Smart may refer to:

- Richard Smart (viticulturalist) (1945–2025), Australian viticulturalist and consultant on viticulture methods
- Richard Smart (actor) (1913–1992), Broadway actor and rancher
- Richard Smart (gentleman) (died 1560), English landowner, twice a Member of Parliament for Ipswich
