= Nicholas Bacon (Ipswich MP) =

17th-century English politician

Sir Nicholas Bacon (c. 1622–1687) was a Tory M.P. for Ipswich, between 16 March 1685 and his death in 1687. He served with Sir John Barker.

He was the son of Nicholas Bacon of Shrubland Hall, Suffolk, and his wife Martha Bingham. He was educated at Emmanuel College, Cambridge before being admitted to Gray's Inn.

== Sources ==
- The House of Commons Constituency

Parliament of England
Preceded by John Wright and Gilbert Lindfield	Member of Parliament for Ipswich; 1685–1687; With: Sir John Barker	Succeeded by Sir Peyton Ventris and Sir John Barker
