= John Bence =

John Bence may refer to:

- John Bence (1622–1688), English merchant and politician,
- John Bence (1670–1718), English politician, MP for Ipswich, and for Dunwich
- John Bence (1581–1635), MP for Aldeburgh
