= Sir Samuel Barnardiston, 2nd Baronet =

English MP and Barrister

Sir Samuel Barnardiston, 2nd Baronet (28 January 1659 – 3 January 1709) was an English MP and Barrister. He lived at Brightwell, Suffolk.

Barnardiston was admitted to Gray's Inn on 10 February 1679. He was M.P. for Ipswich between 1698 and 1700.

He succeeded to the title of 2nd Baronet Barnardiston, of Brightwell Hall, Suffolk on 8 November 1707, on the death of his uncle, Sir Samuel Barnardiston, 1st Baronet. He married Martha Richmond, daughter of Richard Richmond, on 13 August 1709, with a portion of £6,000.

He died on 3 January 1709 at age 49 at Charter House yard, Middlesex, without issue. He was buried on 11 January 1709 at Ketton, Suffolk. His will (dated 20 January 1709) was probated in December 1711.

== Sources ==
- leighrayment.com
- https://www.thepeerage.com/i117.htm#s1679

== Notes ==
Parliament of England
Preceded by Charles Whitaker; Richard Phillips	Member of Parliament for Ipswich; 1698–1699; With: Richard Phillips	Succeeded by Joseph Martin; Sir Charles Duncombe
Baronetage of England
Preceded by Samuel Barnardiston	Baronet (of Ketton); 1707–1711	Succeeded by Peletiah Barnardiston
