= Sir William Barker, 5th Baronet =

British Tory politician

Sir William Barker, 5th Baronet (1685 – 23 July 1731) of Grimston Hall, Suffolk was a British Tory politician who sat in the House of Commons between 1708 and 1731.

== Early life ==
Barker was the son of Sir John Barker, 4th Baronet and his wife Bridget Bacon, daughter of Sir Nicholas Bacon of Shrubland Hall, Suffolk. In 1696, he succeeded his father in the baronetcy. He attended Ipswich school and was admitted at Pembroke College, Cambridge on 7 April 1702, aged 16. He married Mary Bence, only daughter of John Bence, MP, of Heveningham, Suffolk.

== Career ==
After having narrowly failed to get elected in a by-election a year earlier, Barker was returned as Tory Member of Parliament for Ipswich in a contest at the 1708 British general election where his father in law was retiring as an MP. He voted against the impeachment of Henry Sacheverell in 1710. At the 1710 British general election, he was returned again in a contest for Ipswich. He was listed among the 'Tory patriots' who voted against the continuation of the war and among the 'worthy patriots' who laid open the mismanagements of the previous ministry. He was also a member of the October Club. At the 1713 British general election, he was returned unopposed as MP for Thetford.

Barker did not stand at the 1715 general election and was out of parliament for a few years in the course of which his wife Mary died on 1 January 1716. He was returned unopposed as MP for Suffolk at a by-election on 31 October 1722. He spoke against the Government on 23 November 1724 on the army estimates, and on 12 April 1727 on the vote of credit. At the 1727 British general election he was returned for Suffolk in a contest. He spoke against the Government on 7 May 1728 on a vote of credit, and twice in April 1729 on the civil list arrears.

== Death and legacy ==
Barker married as his second wife Anne Spencer, widow of Edward Spencer, of Rendlesham, Suffolk, at St Marylebone Church, London, on 9 February 1731. A few months later, he died on 23 July 1731 at his house in East Street, near Red Lion Square. He was succeeded in the baronetcy by his son Sir John Barker, 6th Baronet, his only child by his first wife. He also left £500 in his will to provide for the upbringing and apprenticeship of Charles King, offspring of Mary King, who may have been his illegitimate son.

Parliament of Great Britain
Preceded by William Churchill; John Bence	Member of Parliament for Ipswich; 1708–1713; With: William Churchill	Succeeded by William Churchill; William Thompson
Preceded by Sir Edmund Bacon; Dudley North	Member of Parliament for Thetford; 1713–1715; With: Dudley North	Succeeded by Dudley North; John Ward
Preceded by Sir Thomas Hanmer; Sir Robert Davers	Member of Parliament for Suffolk; 1722 –1731; With: Sir Thomas Hanmer 1722–1727; Sir Jermyn Davers, Bt 1727–1731	Succeeded by Sir Jermyn Davers, Bt; Sir Robert Kemp
Baronetage of England
Preceded by John Barker	Baronet (of Grimston Hall); 1696–1731	Succeeded by John Barker
