= Robert Lucas =

Robert, Rob, or Bob Lucas, may refer to:

== Law and politics ==
- Robert Lucas (MP), English politician, MP for Ipswich in 1406
- Robert Lucas (governor) (1781–1853), American governor of Ohio, 1832–36, first governor of the Iowa Territory 1838–41
- Rob Lucas (born 1953), Liberal member of the South Australian Legislative Council

== Sports ==
- Robert Slade Lucas (1867–1942), English cricketer
- Robert Lucas (field hockey) (1922–2019), French field hockey player
- Bob Lucas (footballer) (1925–2010), English association football goalkeeper
- Robert Lucas (sailor) (born 1932), Indonesian Olympic sailor

== Others ==
- Robert Lucas, 3rd Baron Lucas of Shenfield (c. 1649–1705), English nobleman and army officer
- Robert Lucas (writer) (1904–1984), Austrian-born writer
- Robert Lyall Lucas (1927–2009), English mycologist, botanist, and phytopathologist
- Robert S. Lucas (1930–2016), U.S. Coast Guard admiral
- Robert Lucas Jr. (1937–2023), American economist
- Robert Lucas (musician) (1962–2008), American musician in the band Canned Heat

== See also ==
- Robert Lucas de Pearsall (1795–1856), English composer
