= William Churchill (Ipswich MP) =

British politician (1661–1737)

William Churchill (11 August 1661 – 1737) of Dallinghoo, Suffolk, was a British politician who sat in the House of Commons between 1707 and 1717.

Churchill was the second son of William Churchill of Dorchester. He was brother of the MPs Awnsham Churchill and Joshua Churchill. He married Rose Sayer, daughter of John Sayer of Woodbridge.

In the 1680s, Churchill was a radical Whig publisher. In 1685, he was accused of printing James Scott, 1st Duke of Monmouth's Declaration, and fled to the Netherlands. He became useful to William of Orange and printed many of his declarations at the time of the Revolution. As a reward, he was appointed bookbinder, stationer to the king in 1689 and held the post for the rest of his life. He was appointed cashier to the ordinance office in 1699 and held the post until 1702.

Churchill was returned as Member of Parliament for Ipswich at a by-election on 21 November 1707.He was re-elected MP for Ipswich in 1708 and 1710. At the 1713 general election, he was initially elected in the poll, but was unseated on petition on 1 April 1714. He was returned again as MP for Ipswich at the 1715 general election, but was granted a patent for supplying stationery to the crown, and resigned his seat on 8 December 1717, in favour of his son-in-law Francis Negus. He built a hall at Dallinghoo, which later burnt down.

Churchill died in February 1737. He and his wife had one daughter Elizabeth, who married Francis Negus. His estate passed to William Castle.

Parliament of Great Britain
Preceded by Henry Poley; John Bence	Member of Parliament for Ipswich; 1707–1714; With: John Bence; Sir William Barker; William Thompson	Succeeded by Richard Richardson; Orlando Bridgeman
Preceded by Richard Richardson; Orlando Bridgeman	Member of Parliament for Ipswich; 1715–1717; With: William Thompson; Francis Negus	Succeeded by Philip Broke; Francis Negus
