= Henry Wall =

Henry Wall may refer to:

- Henry Arthur Wall, on List of mayors of Bristol, England for 1942
- Henry Wall (cricketer) (1852–1914), English cricketer
- Henry Wall (MP) (fl. 1390s), MP for Ipswich
- Henry Wall (rugby union) (1935–2016), Irish rugby union player

== See also ==
- Henry Wahl (1915–1984), Norwegian speed skater
- Harry Wall (disambiguation)
