= John Liew =

John Liew may refer to:

- John Liew (MP)
- John Liew, co-founder of AQR Capital
