= Robert Daundy =

16th-century English politician

Member of Parliament for Ipswich
- In office 1539–1542

Personal details
- Born: By 1500
- Died: 1558 (aged 57–58)
- Parent: Edmund Daundy (father)

Robert Daundy (by 1500–1558), of Ipswich, Suffolk, was an English businessman and politician. He was closely associated with another Ipswich businessman, Henry Tooley.

== Biography ==
Robert was the second son of Edmund Daundy (1468 – 1515) and his wife Joan nee Rede of Beccles. Joan was a niece of Henry Tooley and daughter of Margaret Tooley who had married William Rede.

He was a wealthy merchant of Ipswich, who was elected as chamberlain for the town against his will in 1521. Among the actions he took under this post, he was associated with the building of a new college for Ipswich, and for importing miscellaneous goods, including salt and tallow. In late 1537, Daundy became involved in a dispute with the abbot of Furness over the seizure by the abbot's men of wines belonging, rightfully, to him. Thomas Cromwell intervened to the end that the cargo was restored to its "virtuous and rightful owner", Daundy. He was elected as a Member of Parliament (MP) for Ipswich in 1539.

Parliament of England
Preceded by ? ?	Member of Parliament for Ipswich; 1539-1542; With: William Sabine	Succeeded by Ralph Goodwin; John Sparrow
