= Sir Charles Blois, 1st Baronet =

English Tory politician

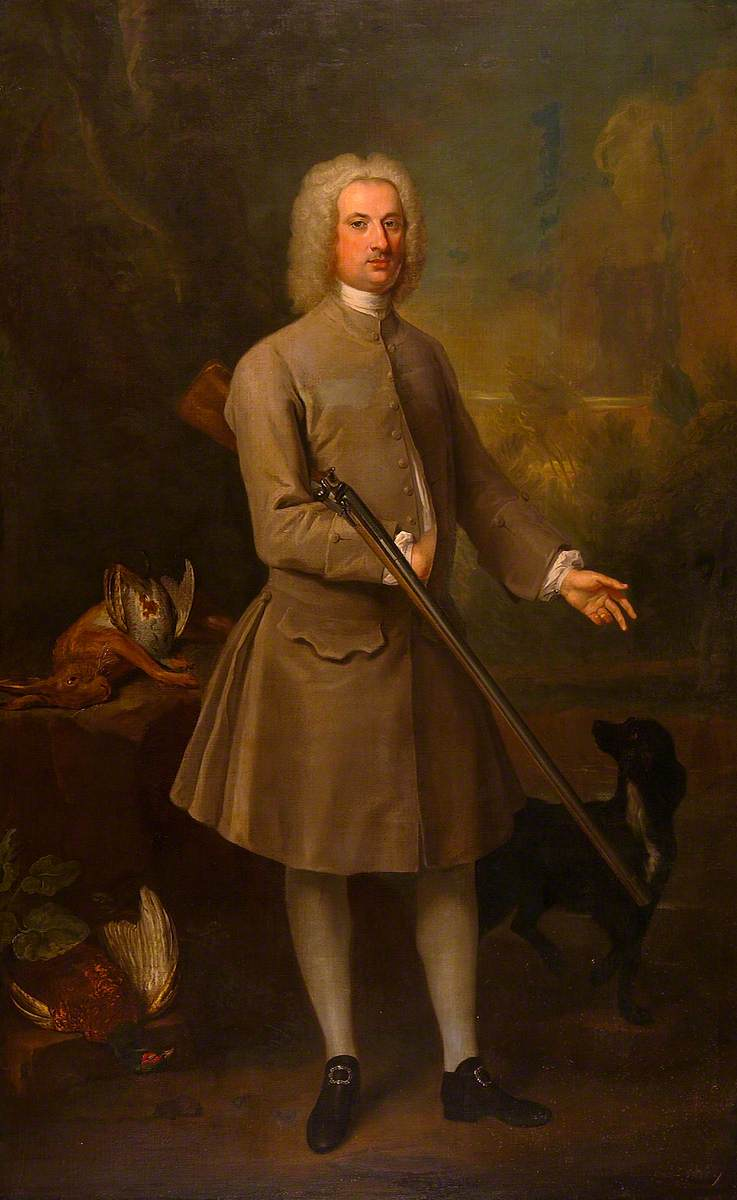
- Portrait of Sir Charles Blois by William Aikman
- Born: 14 September 1657
- Died: 9 April 1738 (aged 80)
- Occupation: Tory politician

Sir Charles Blois, 1st Baronet (14 September 1657 – 9 April 1738), of Grundisburgh Hall and Cockfield Hall, Yoxford, Suffolk, was a British Tory politician who sat in the English House of Commons and the House of Commons of Great Britain between 1695 and 1709.

== Early life ==
Charles was the son of Sir William Blois, of Grundisburgh Hall and his first wife Martha Brooke (died 1657), daughter of Sir Robert Brooke (1572–1646) of Cockfield Hall and his wife Elizabeth. However as his mother died very soon after his birth, Charles's father remarried to Jane Barnardiston (daughter of Sir Nathaniel Barnardiston (1588–1653) of Kedington, Suffolk), who had previous been married to Charles's uncle John Brooke, brother of Martha. Jane was therefore the only mother that he knew.

The principal heir to Cockfield Hall, his uncle Robert Brooke, died in 1669 in a bathing accident in the river Rhone in France. Charles's father Sir William Blois dying in 1676 (when Abigail Hodges, Sir William's sister, disputed the estate with Jane Blois, the relict), Charles married Mary Kemp, daughter of Sir Robert Kemp, 2nd Baronet, of Gissing Hall, Norfolk, on 11 May 1680. His grandmother, Elizabeth Brooke (having a life interest in Cockfield Hall), died there in 1683, and his aunt Mary Brooke (like Charles, a co-heir to the younger Robert Brooke) lived down to 1693. Having been created baronet in 1686, Charles succeeded to Cockfield Hall in 1693 and made his principal home there.

His sister Mary was the third wife of Sir Nevill Catlin and then wife of Sir Charles Turner, 1st Baronet.

== Career ==
Blois was an Alderman of Dunwich from 1685 and was appointed to the commission of the peace for Suffolk in 1685. On 15 April 1686 he was created Baronet Blois, of Grundisburgh and Cockfield Hall.

In March 1688, he was appointed a Commissioner for inquiry into recusancy fines for Cambridgeshire, Norfolk and Suffolk. He was removed from the Dunwich corporation in June 1688 but was restored in November 1688 and was Commissioner of assessment for Suffolk from 1689–90, and for Dunwich and Ipswich in 1689. He was returned as a Tory Member of Parliament for Ipswich in a by-election on 28 May 1689. A very active Member of the Convention Parliament, he was appointed to 36 committees.

He was returned in a contest as MP for Ipswich at the 1690 English general election and as a Court Tory continued a high level of activity in Parliament.

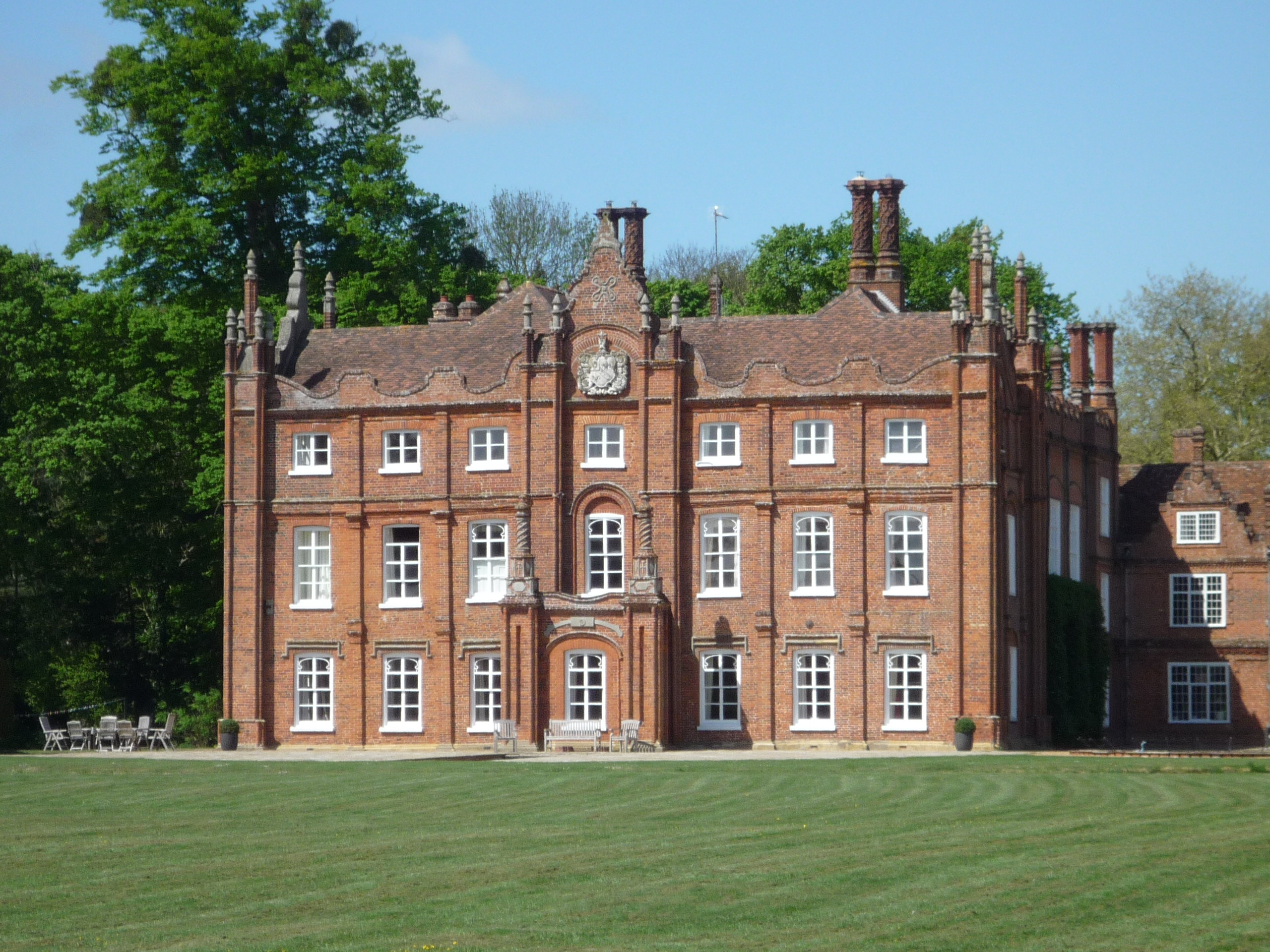
Cockfield Hall, the seat of the Blois family

In 1693 Blois succeeded his aunt Mary Brooke to the Yoxford estate, which gave him an electoral interest at Dunwich. His wife Mary died in 1693 and he married as his second wife, by licence dated 18 April 1694, Anne Hawtrey, daughter of Ralph Hawtrey, MP of Eastcote House, Ruislip, Middlesex. He was defeated at Ipswich at the 1695 English general election and did not stand in 1698.

Blois was returned as MP for Dunwich at a by-election on 29 January 1700 and followed up with a return unopposed at the first general election of 1701. He was blacklisted for opposing the preparations for war with France. On his return unopposed at the second general election of 1701, he was classed with the Tories and voted on 26 February 1702 for the vindication of the impeachment proceedings against William III's ministers.

He was returned unopposed at the 1702 election and was active in Parliament with local matters. He voted for the Tack on 28 November 1704. At the 1705 English general election he was again unopposed at Dunwich and voted against the Court candidate for Speaker on 25 October 1705.

There was a contest at Dunwich at the 1708 British general election and he was elected in the poll but was unseated on petition on 5 February 1709. He did not stand for Parliament again. He was bailiff of Dunwich in 1708 and from 1711 to 1712, and probably a portman in 1709.

== Death and legacy ==
Blois died on 9 April 1738 and was buried at Grundisburgh. By his first wife Mary, he had three sons, of whom two predeceased him, and a daughter. He was succeeded in the baronetcy by his surviving son, Charles, later 3rd Baronet. By his second wife Anne, he had two sons (one of whom predeceased him) and a daughter Anne. The surviving son, Ralph, became the 4th Baronet.

== Sources ==
Parliament of England
| Preceded by Sir Peyton Ventris; Sir John Barker, Bt | Member of Parliament for Ipswich; 1689–1695; With: Sir John Barker, Bt | Succeeded by Charles Whitaker; Sir John Barker, Bt |
| Preceded by Sir Robert Rich with John Bence and Henry Heveningham | Member of Parliament for Dunwich; 1700–1709; With: Henry Heveningham; Sir Robert Kemp; John Rous | Succeeded by Daniel Harvey and Sir Richard Allin |
Baronetage of England
| New creation | Baronet (of Grundisburgh and Cockfield Hall); 1686–1738 | Succeeded by Charles Blois |
