= Robert Waleys =

English politician

Robert Waleys (fl. 1373 – 1388) of Ipswich, Suffolk, was an English attorney and Member of Parliament (MP). He was the son and heir of Richard Waleys, who was from Kersey, Suffolk. Waleys married a woman named Alice at some point before April 1365.

He was a Member of the Parliament of England for Ipswich in 1373, January 1377, October 1377, January 1380, 1381, November 1384, 1385, 1386, February 1388 and September 1388.

He was confined to Fleet Prison over a debt.
