= William Thompson (Ipswich MP) =

English judge and Whig politician

Sir William Thompson (1678 – 27 October 1739), of Middle Temple, was an English judge and Whig politician who sat in the House of Commons between 1709 and 1729.

== Early life ==
Thompson was second son of Sir William Thompson (died 1695), serjeant-at-law, and his wife, Mary Stephens of Bermondsey. He was educated at Brentwood Grammar School (Essex) and admitted at Trinity College, Cambridge on 25 April 1691, aged 14. He was awarded BA in 1695.

In 1688, he was admitted a student at the Middle Temple, where he was called to the bar in 1698. He married by licence dated 16 July 1701, Mrs Joyce Brent, a widow of St Clement Danes, Middlesex. He married, as his second wife, on 7 November 1710, Julia Blackett, widow of Sir William Blacket, Bt, of Newcastle-upon-Tyne and the daughter of Sir Christopher Conyers, Bt, of Horden, Durham.

== Career ==
Thompson stood for Orford, Suffolk at the 1708 British general election on the recommendation of Sir Thomas Felton, 4th Baronet and though defeated in the poll with only three votes, was seated on petition as Member of Parliament for Orford on 29 January 1709. He voted for the naturalization of the Palatines, and was probably a teller on 7 March 1709 against a Tory amendment to the bill to prevent naturalized persons from standing or voting at parliamentary elections. He was put forward to sit on the committee to draw up the articles of impeachment against Dr Sacheverell on 14 December 1709, spoke on 11 January 1710 against the recommittal of the articles, and voted for the impeachment. He was involved in the prosecution of Sacheverell's riotous supporters, Daniel Dammaree, Francis Willis, and George Purchase over the period March to April 1710. At the 1710 British general election he stood at Ipswich but was unsuccessful. At the 1713 general election, he was returned as MP for Ipswich but was unseated by petition on 1 April 1714.

Thompson regained the seat in the 1715 general election, and retained it until his elevation to the exchequer bench in November 1729. On 3 March 1715 Thompson was elected Recorder of London, and was knighted on 18 July 1715. He took part in the impeachment of the Jacobite George Seton, 5th Earl of Wintoun, 15–19 March 1716, Appointed for the solicitor-generalship, 24 January 1717, he was dismissed from that office, 17 March 1720, for bringing an unfounded charge of corrupt practices against attorney-general Nicholas Lechmere. Retaining the recordership, he was accorded in 1724 precedence in all courts after the solicitor-general. On 23 May 1726 he was appointed cursitor baron, and on 27 November 1729 he succeeded Sir Bernard Hale as puisne Baron of the Exchequer, having first been called to the degree of serjeant-at-law (17 November) This office with the recordership he retained until his death at Bath, 27 October 1739.

He bought the manor of Hensington from the executors of Thomas Napier in 1726. His devisees sold it in 1753 to Charles Spencer, 3rd Duke of Marlborough.

In 1717 William Thompson introduced an act into the House of Commons that eventually became law in 1718 (4 Geo. 1. c. 11). Known as the Transportation Act 1717 (or the Piracy Act 1717), the Transportation Act formalized the process for transporting British criminals (except Scottish) to the American colonies. Seen as a way to reduce crime in Britain felons who committed clergyable offenses could be transported for 7 years and receivers of stolen goods could be transported for 14 years. This act of Thompson's resulted in tens of thousands of convicts being transported to the American colonies (including Canada and the West Indies) and later to Australia between 1718 and the end of transportation in 1867.

== Family ==
Thompson died on 27 October 1739. He had no children by either wife.

== Sources ==
Attribution

This article incorporates text from a publication now in the public domain: "Thompson, William (1678-1739)". Dictionary of National Biography. London: Smith, Elder & Co. 1885–1900.

Parliament of Great Britain
Preceded by Richard Richardson; Orlando Bridgeman	Member of Parliament for Ipswich; 1715–1730; With: William Churchill to 1717; Francis Negus from 1717	Succeeded by Philip Broke; Francis Negus
Legal offices
Preceded by John Fortescue Aland, 1st Baron Fortescue of Credan	Solicitor General for England and Wales; 1717–1720	Succeeded by Philip Yorke, 1st Earl of Hardwicke
