= 1883 Ipswich by-election =

UK Parliamentary by-election

The 1883 by-election for Ipswich was held when the sitting Conservative MP Thomas Clement Cobbold died. It was won by the previous Liberal MP for Ipswich, Henry Wyndham West. The unsuccessful Conservative candidate was William Thomas Charley.

1883 Ipswich by-election
Party	Candidate	Votes	%	±%
Liberal	Henry Wyndham West	3,266	53.7	+3.7
Conservative	William Thomas Charley	2,816	46.3	−3.8
Majority		450	7.4	N/A
Turnout		6,082	76.9	−5.6 (est)
Registered electors		7,914		
Liberal gain from Conservative		Swing	+3.8	
