= Henry Wyndham West =

Henry Wyndham West (7 November 1823 – 25 November 1893) was an English barrister and Liberal politician.

== Life ==
West was the son of Martin John West and his wife Lady Maria Walpole, daughter of the 2nd Earl of Orford. His father was Recorder of Lynn, and Commissioner of Bankrupts for the Leeds District. He was educated at Eton and Christ Church, Oxford. He was called to the bar at Inner Temple in 1848 and served on the Northern Circuit, becoming Recorder of Scarborough in 1858 and then Recorder of Manchester in 1865 (until 1893). He was appointed Attorney General of the Duchy of Lancaster in 1861 and Queen's Counsel in 1868.

West stood unsuccessfully as Member of Parliament for Ipswich in 1865, but was elected for the seat in 1868. He lost the seat in 1874, but was re-elected in 1883. He was unseated in 1886 after the election was declared void on account of corrupt practices by the party's agents. He didn't stand in the subsequent by-election where the Liberals lost both seats.

== Family ==
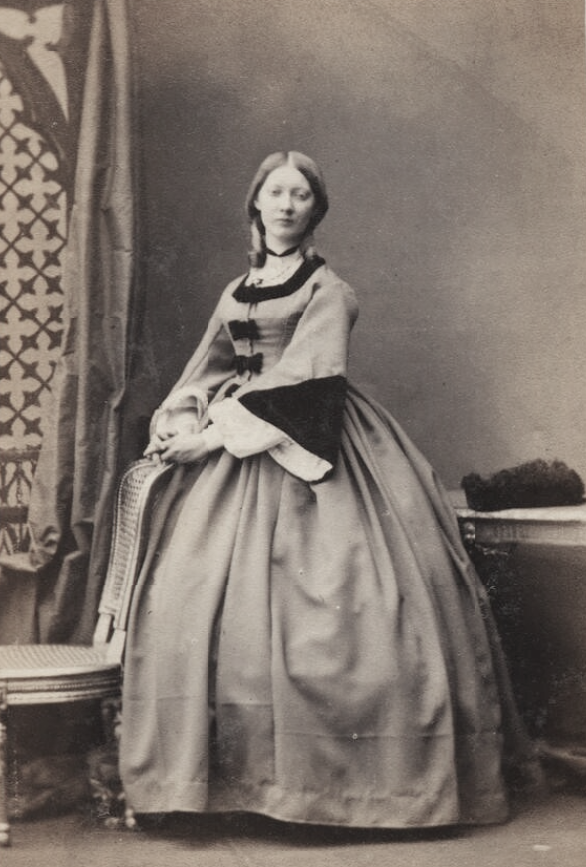
Violet Katherine Campbell, 1861 photograph

West married Violet Katherine Campbell, daughter of Walter Frederick Campbell, in 1870. West's nickname in early life was "Zephyr,". The winter nuptials were celebrated by an epigram written by George Webbe Dasent.

"Quaerebat Zephyrus brumali tempore florem:
En! Campis Bellis incidit in Violam."

"Zephyr was looking for a flower in the deepest winter. Lo! On the battlefield, he fell upon Violet".

Parliament of the United Kingdom
Preceded by John Cobbold; Hugh Adair	Member of Parliament for Ipswich; 1868–1874; With: Hugh Adair	Succeeded by John Patteson Cobbold; James Redfoord Bulwer
Preceded by Thomas Cobbold; Jesse Collings	Member of Parliament for Ipswich; 1883–1886; With: Jesse Collings	Succeeded by Sir Charles Dalrymple; Lord Elcho
