= Richard Felaw =

English businessman and politician (c.1420–1483)

Richard Felaw (c.1420–1483) was an English businessman, philanthropist and politician based in Ipswich. He was twice a Member of Parliament for Ipswich, in 1449 and 1460–2.

Richard was the son of John and Agnes Felaw, the daughter of Thomas Denys. John Felaw was a burgess of Ipswich Corporation, servings as a bailiff from 1439 to 1440.

Richard was closely associated with John Howard, of Tendring Hall, Stoke-by-Nayland. Howard was a prominent Yorkist who was knighted by Edward IV after the Battle of Towton, which victory had secured the installation of Edward as King of England. Howard gained a number of significant offices from the crown in East Anglia.
