= Francis Bacon (Ipswich MP) =

17th-century English politician

Convention Parliament Member
- In office April 1660 – ?

Protectorate Parliament Member for Ipswich
- In office 1654–1660

Long Parliament Member for Ipswich
- In office 1645–1653

Personal details
- Born: 30 September 1600
- Died: c. September 1663 (aged 62–63)
- Parent: Sir Edward Bacon (father)
- Relatives: Nathaniel Bacon (brother); Sir Nicholas Bacon (grandfather)
- Education: Queens' College, Cambridge

Francis Bacon (30 September 1600 – c. September 1663) was an English politician who sat in the House of Commons at various times between 1645 and 1660. He supported the Parliamentary cause in the English Civil War.

== Life ==
Bacon was the son of Sir Edward Bacon of Shrubland Hall, Barham, Suffolk, son of Queen Elizabeth's Keeper of the Great Seal Sir Nicholas Bacon by his first wife, Jane Ferneley (d. 1552). He was educated at Queens' College, Cambridge. His brother was Nathaniel Bacon, and his uncle was the more famous philosopher and statesman Francis Bacon.

In 1645 Bacon was elected Member of Parliament (MP) for Ipswich in the Long Parliament. In 1654 he was re-elected MP for Ipswich in the First Protectorate Parliament and was returned in 1656 and 1659 for the Second and Third Protectorate Parliaments.

In April 1660, Bacon was elected for the Convention Parliament which proclaimed the Restoration of Charles II in which he served with his brother Nathaniel and later with Sir Frederick Cornwallis Bt.

He had married Katherine, daughter of Sir Thomas Wingfield of Letheringham, Suffolk; they had six sons (of whom four died before him) and two daughters.

Parliament of England
Preceded by John Gurdon; William Cage	Member of Parliament for Ipswich; 1645–1653; With: John Gurdon	Succeeded by Not represented in the Barebones Parliament
Preceded by Not represented in the Barebones Parliament	Member of Parliament for Ipswich; 1654–1660; With: Nathaniel Bacon 1654–1659	Succeeded by John Sicklemore; William Blois
