= Nathaniel Bacon (English politician) =

English politician

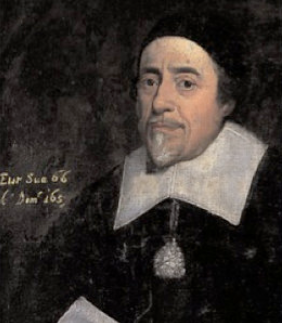
Nathaniel Bacon, 1657. This painting was on display in Ipswich Town Hall in 1884

Nathaniel Bacon (12 December 1593 – 1660) was an English Puritan lawyer, writer and politician who sat in the House of Commons at various times between 1645 and 1660. He was Judge of the High Court of Admiralty 1653 to 1654.

== Life ==
Bacon was the son of Sir Edward Bacon of Shrubland Hall, Barham, son of Queen Elizabeth's Lord Keeper of the Great Seal, Sir Nicholas Bacon, by his first wife, Jane Ferneley (d.1552). He was educated at Christ's College, Cambridge. In 1617 he was called to the bar.

Bacon was a Parliamentarian, active in support of the New Model Army from 1644, Bacon became Member of Parliament for Cambridge University in 1645, as a recruiter to the Long Parliament until he was excluded after Pride's Purge.

Bacon was elected MP for Ipswich for the First Protectorate Parliament in 1654, along with his brother Francis Bacon and the two represented Ipswich together until his death. He also served as an Admiralty Judge and Master of Requests (1657).

== Works ==
=== The Fearefull Estate of Francis Spira (1638) ===
The remark

Man knows the beginning of sin, but who bounds the issues thereof?

appears in The Fearefull Estate of Francis Spira

It is cited by John Bunyan in Grace Abounding, as being by Francesco Spiera, but is misattributed, and is really Bacon's, from this work on Speira.

=== Historical Discourse (1647–51) ===
Bacon's An Historical Discourse of the Uniformity of the Government of England has been described as the first historical work on Norman England to argue closely from sources, and as "the classical statement of the thesis of Anglo-Saxon liberties". He "presented the ... Saxons as a free people governed by laws made by themselves". Glenn Burgess describes it as "a work of considerable scholarship as well as a piece of political propaganda". It argued continuity of the kingship of William the Conqueror with that of previous kings. It was generally aristocratic and republican in tone, strongly anti-clerical, favouring government by an elected council.

=== The Annals of Ipswich (1654) ===
The Annals of Ipswich constitute a significant contribution to the history of Ipswich, and mark out Bacon's capabilities as a historian. However the first text, "The Perambulation of the Liberty of Ipswich", has been questioned by Keith Briggs as lacking authenticity. He points out that despite Bacon's claim that the document dated from 1352/3, the language used is in early modern English inconsistent with the dating of the text being written in the fourteenth century.

== Family ==
Bacon married twice: firstly Elizabeth, daughter of Robert Maydston of Boxted, Essex, and widow of Edward Glascock of Great Horkesley, Essex (no children) and secondly Susan, daughter of William Holloway, clothier, of East Bergholt, Suffolk, and widow of Matthew Alefounder, clothier, of Dedham, Essex with whom he had four sons and five daughters. His brother was Francis Bacon, the Ipswich MP.

== Notes ==
Parliament of England
Preceded by Thomas Eden; Henry Lucas	Member of Parliament for Cambridge University; 1640–1653; With: Henry Lucas 1640–1648	Succeeded by Not represented in Barebones Parliament
Preceded by Not represented in Barebones Parliament	Member of Parliament for Ipswich; 1654–1659; With: Francis Bacon	Succeeded by Francis Bacon; John Gurdon
Preceded by Francis Bacon; John Gurdon	Member of Parliament for Ipswich; 1660; With: Francis Bacon	Succeeded by Sir Frederick Cornwallis; Francis Bacon
