= Rigby Wason =

Scottish barrister, farmer, and politician

(Peter) Rigby Wason (1797 – 24 July 1875) was a Scottish barrister and farmer, and a Whig politician. He was Member of Parliament (MP) for Ipswich in Suffolk from 1831 until his defeat at the 1835 general election. However, the election was declared void on petition, and he was returned to the House of Commons at the resulting by-election, holding the seat until he was defeated again at the 1837 general election.

He regained the seat at the 1841 general election, but that election was overturned on petition and he did not stand again.

Wason married Euphemia McTier. Their children included Cathcart Wason (1848–1921), a New Zealand settler and MP who returned to Scotland and became MP for Orkney and Shetland, and Eugene Wason (1846–1927), a lawyer and Liberal MP. Peter Cathcart Wason was Eugene's grandchild.

Parliament of the United Kingdom
Preceded by Robert Dundas; Charles Mackinnon	Member of Parliament for Ipswich; 1831–1835; With: James Morrison	Succeeded by Fitzroy Kelly; Robert Dundas
Preceded by Fitzroy Kelly; Robert Dundas	Member of Parliament for Ipswich; 1835–1837; With: James Morrison	Succeeded by Thomas Milner Gibson; Henry Tufnell
