= William Master (MP for Ipswich) =

William Master was one of the two MPs for Ipswich in January 1380, 1385 and possibly 1395.

Master was an attorney and a merchant, trading wool, wine, cloth and other merchandise.

Master was related to Thomas Master, who also represented Ipswich in 1357.

Master's son, John, was arrested after being accused of theft and an adulterous relationship with the wife of the deputy master of the Royal Mint. It is unclear why Master was arrested as well as his son, and the outcome is unknown. Master procured a royal pardon of outlawry in 1398 after he was sued by a draper for a debt of £6 10s.
