= Thomas Hayward (16th-century MP) =

English politician

Thomas Hayward (by 1507–1534), of Ipswich, Suffolk, was an English politician.

He was a Member of Parliament (MP) for Ipswich in 1529.
