= Robert Andrew (MP for Ipswich) =

14th-century British politician

Member of Parliament for Ipswich
- In office 1391 - c. 1395

Personal details
- Relatives: John Andrew (brother); James Andrew (brother)

Robert Andrew was one of the two Members of Parliament for Ipswich in 1391 and possibly 1393.

Andrew is thought to have been a son of William Andrew and a brother of John Andrew and James Andrew. They were a well-established family in the Stoke area, on the edge of Ipswich.

He married a woman named Alice, and they had one son
