= John Knepping =

John Knepping was one of the two MPs for Ipswich in the English parliaments in 1420.
