= Edward Bacon (died 1618) =

English politician

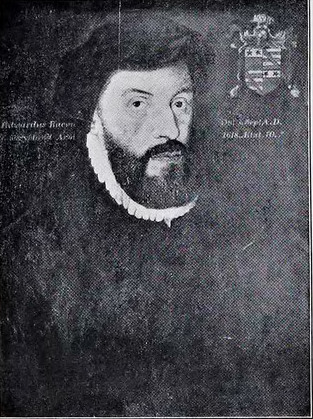
- Born: 1548
- Died: 8 September 1618 (aged 69–70)
- Alma mater: Trinity College
- Occupation: Politician
- Spouse(s): Helen Littel
- Children: at least 8, including Nathaniel Bacon and Francis Bacon
- Parent(s): Nicholas Bacon; Jane Ferneley
- Position held: Member of the 1572-83 Parliament, Member of the 1584-85 Parliament, Member of the 1586-87 Parliament

Sir Edward Bacon (died 8 September 1618), of Shrubland Hall in the parish of Coddenham in Suffolk, England, was a Member of Parliament and an elder half-brother of the philosopher and statesman Sir Francis Bacon.

== Life ==
He was the third son of Sir Nicholas Bacon, Lord Keeper of the Great Seal to Queen Elizabeth I, by his first wife Jane Fernley, a daughter of William Ferneley of Creeting St Peter in Suffolk. Like his two elder brothers he was educated at Trinity College, Cambridge and entered Gray's Inn for legal training. He became a Member of Parliament, representing Great Yarmouth (1576–1581) in Norfolk, Tavistock (1584) in Devon, Weymouth and Melcombe Regis (1586) and the County Seat of Suffolk (1593). He also served as High Sheriff of Suffolk in 1601, and was knighted in 1603.

During the late 1570s Bacon travelled in continental Europe (Paris, Ravenna, Padua, Vienna). He stayed a longer period of time in Geneva, where he visited two leading Protestants Johannes Sturmius and Lambert Danaeus; Bacon lived in Theodore Beza’s house in Geneva while a student of the latter. Bacon had returned to England by 1583.

== Marriage and issue ==
In about 1581 he married Helen Little, daughter and heiress of Thomas Little of Shrubland Hall by his wife Elizabeth Lytton, a daughter and co-heiress of Sir Robert Lytton of Knebworth House in Hertfordshire. With his wife he had two sons who were also Members of Parliament:

- Nathaniel Bacon (1593–1660);
- Francis Bacon (1600–1663).
