= John Wood (MP for Ipswich) =

English MP

John Wood was one of the two MPs for Ipswich in the English parliaments of 1420.
