= John Arnold (MP for Ipswich) =

English politician

Member of Parliament for Ipswich
- In office 1388, 1394, 1397, 1399

Personal details
- Died: c. 1410

John Arnold (died c. 1410), of Blaxhall and Ipswich, Suffolk, was an English Member of Parliament.

== Biography ==
Arnold was a Member (MP) of the Parliament of England for Ipswich in September 1388, 1394, January 1397 and 1399; he was also coroner and bailiff of the town and an alnager in Suffolk.

He married, at some point before 1387, a woman named Christine. She was probably a daughter of Thomas Terry, also of Ipswich.
