= Hugh Adair =

British politician

Sir Hugh Edward Adair, 3rd Baronet (26 December 1815 – 2 March 1902) was a British Liberal Party politician who served from 1847 to 1874 as a Member of Parliament (MP) for Ipswich in Suffolk.

== Biography ==
Adair was the second son of Sir Robert Shafto Adair, 1st Baronet, and his first wife Elizabeth Maria Strode. He was educated at Harrow, and at St John's College, Oxford.

Adair was elected at the 1847 general election as one of the two MPs for Ipswich, and held the seat until he stood down from the House of Commons at the 1874 general election.

He succeeded to the baronetcy in February 1886, on the death of his elder brother Robert.

He died at Tunbridge Wells on 2 March 1902, aged 86.

== Family ==
Adair married Harriet Camilla Adair, daughter of Alexander Adair, on 10 July 1856. They had three sons, the eldest of whom lived for only ten years.

On his death, his second son Frederick succeeded to the baronetcy, and after Frederick's death in 1915 the title was inherited by Hugh's third son, Robert.

Parliament of the United Kingdom
Preceded by John Neilson Gladstone; Sackville Lane-Fox	Member of Parliament for Ipswich; 1847 – 1874; With: John Cobbold 1847–1868; Henry Wyndham West 1868–1874	Succeeded by John Cobbold; James Redfoord Bulwer
Baronetage of the United Kingdom
Preceded by Robert Adair	Baronet (of Flixton Hall, Suffolk); 1886–1902	Succeeded by Frederick Edward Shafto Adair
