= James Andrew (MP) =

British politician

Member of Parliament for Ipswich
- In office 1410 – December 1421

Personal details
- Relatives: John Andrew (brother); Robert Andrew (brother)

James Andrew was one of the two MPs for Ipswich in a variety of English Parliaments from 1410 to December 1421.
