= John Barker (died 1589) =

English politician

John Barker (ca. 1532–1589), of Ipswich, Suffolk, was an English politician.

He was a member of parliament (MP) for Ipswich in 1584, 1586 and 1589.
