= Henry Tufnell (Whig politician) =

British politician (1805–1854)

Henry Tufnell (1805 – 15 June 1854) was a British Whig politician.

He was born the eldest son of William Tufnell of Chichester (MP for Colchester, 1806) and was educated at Eton College and Christ Church, Oxford, where he graduated B.A. in 1829. Whilst at Oxford, he, along with George Cornewall Lewis, translated Karl Otfried Müller's book The History and Antiquities of the Doric Race into English.

He was appointed secretary to Sir Robert Wilmot-Horton when the latter was Governor of Ceylon and from 1835 to 1839 was Private Secretary to Lord Minto when that Earl was First Lord of the Admiralty.

He entered the House of Commons in 1837 as a member for Ipswich, having previously been defeated in the Colchester election in 1835, but lost that seat a year later. He was returned for Devonport in a by-election in 1840 and held that seat until 1854. He held minor posts in the governments of Lord Melbourne and Lord John Russell, and was made a Privy Counsellor when he resigned for health reasons in 1850.

He died at the age of 49. He had married 3 times; firstly in 1830 Anne Augusta, the daughter of the Rt Hon. Sir Robert Wilmot-Horton, secondly in 1844 the Hon. Frances Byng, daughter of the Earl of Strafford and thirdly in 1848 Lady Anne Primrose, daughter of the 4th Earl of Rosebery. He had a son and two daughters.

Parliament of the United Kingdom
Preceded by James Morrison; Rigby Wason	Member of Parliament for Ipswich; 1837–1838; With: Thomas Milner Gibson	Succeeded by Fitzroy Kelly; Thomas Milner Gibson
Preceded by Sir Edward Codrington; Sir George Grey, Bt	Member of Parliament for Devonport; 1840–1854; With: Sir George Grey, Bt to 1847; John Romilly 1847–1852; Sir George Berkeley from 1852	Succeeded by Sir Thomas Erskine Perry; Sir George Berkeley
Political offices
Preceded by Lord Seymour	Junior Lord of the Treasury; 1839–1841	Succeeded by James Milnes Gaskell; Henry Bingham Baring; Alexander Perceval; Alexander Pringle
Preceded by John Young	Parliamentary Secretary to the Treasury; 1846–1850	Succeeded by William Goodenough Hayter
