= Francis Negus =

Francis Negus (1670 – 9 September 1732) of Dallinghoo, Suffolk, was an English Army officer, courtier and Whig politician. He sat in the House of Commons from 1717 to 1732. He is the reputed inventor of the drink negus.

== Early life ==
Negus is a Norfolk family name. Negus was baptized on 3 May 1670. He is the son of Francis Negus of St Paul's, Covent Garden and his wife Elianore Boone. His father was secretary to Henry Howard, 7th Duke of Norfolk, and in that capacity made the acquaintance of Elias Ashmole. Negus joined the army and was ensign in the 3rd Foot in 1687, captain in 1691, and major in 1694. He renewed his commission in 1702 and served in the French wars under John Churchill, 1st Duke of Marlborough, attaining the rank of lieutenant-colonel in the 25th Regiment of Foot in 1703. He married, by licence dated 14 February 1704, Elizabeth Churchill, daughter of William Churchill. In 1712 he succeeded his father to the Dallinghoo estate. He was sometime ranger of Bagshot Rails and Sandhurst Walks, Windsor forest.

In 1719 he was one of the original backers of the Royal Academy of Music, establishing a London opera company which commissioned numerous works from Handel and others.

== Political career ==
In 1715, Negus was appointed joint commissioner for executing the office of master of the horse, becoming on 27 June 1717 sole commissioner, an office he held until 1727. He was returned as Member of Parliament for Ipswich at a by-election on 13 November 1717 in succession to his father in law. He voted regularly with the Government and was returned unopposed at the 1722 British general election and in a contest at the 1727 British general election.

He was appointed avener and clerk marshal to George II on 20 June 1727, and master of his majesty's buckhounds on 19 July in the same year. Negus was also ranger of Swinley Chase, lieutenant and deputy warden of Windsor Forest, and one of the commissioners of the lieutenancy of Middlesex and liberty of Westminster. In 1728 he became an assistant of the Royal African Company for the rest of his life. He was also a governor of Chelsea Waterworks.

== Death and legacy ==
Negus died at Dallinghoo, on 9 September 1732 leaving a son and daughter. The Ipswich Gazette published a poem in his memory which began 'Is Negus gone? ah! Ipswich weep and mourn'.

== The invention of negus ==
It is related that on one occasion, when the bottle was passing rather more rapidly than good fellowship seemed to warrant over a hot political discussion, in which a number of prominent whigs and tories were taking part, Negus recommended the dilution of the wine with hot water and sugar. Attention was diverted from the point at issue to a discussion of the merits of wine and water, which ended in the compound being nicknamed "negus."

— Thomas Seccombe, Dictionary of National Biography

Edmond Malone in his Life of Dryden (1800) states that "the mixture now called Negus ... was invented in Queen Anne's time by Colonel Negus," but does not go into further detail. Additional evidence is cited by Thomas Seccombe in the Dictionary of National Biography.

Parliament of Great Britain
Preceded by William Thompson; William Churchill	Member of Parliament for Ipswich; 1717–1732; With: William Thompson 1717–1730; Philip Broke 1730–1732	Succeeded by Philip Broke; William Wollaston
Political offices
Vacant Title last held by The Earl of Cardigan	Master of the Buckhounds; 1727–1732	Succeeded by The Earl of Tankerville
Court offices
Preceded by Conyers Darcy	Avener and Clerk Marshal; 1727–1732	Vacant Title next held by James Lumley
