= John Cobbold (1797–1882) =

British brewer, railway developer and politician

John Chevallier Cobbold DL JP (24 August 1797 – 6 October 1882) was a British brewer, railway developer and Conservative Party politician.

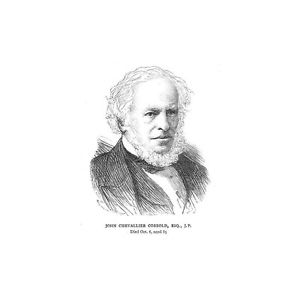
John Chevallier Cobbold - English brewer and railway pioneer

== Background ==
Cobbold was the son of John Wilkinson Cobbold and Harriet, daughter of Temple Chevallier (a priest). Until his father's death in 1860 he lived at Cobbold Lodge in Felixstowe.

== Business career ==
Cobbold was a member of an established brewing family who had been brewing beer in Ipswich since 1746.

He was one of the driving forces behind the establishment of the Eastern Union Railway (EUR) which saw Ipswich connected to Colchester (and thus London) by rail in 1846 and the Ipswich and Bury Railway which saw the railway open to Bury St Edmunds in 1847. The two railways merged and a line to Norwich was opened in 1849. The EUR was taken over by the Eastern Counties Railway (ECR) in 1854 with ECR chairman David Waddington leading the negotiations and driving a hard bargain leading Cobbold to remark "a strong minority of our Board consider that you have done us".

He also had shipping interests and between 1820 and 1865 more than 20 ships of up to 350 tons were acquired for regular trading with India and China.

== Political career ==
Cobbold was Mayor of Ipswich between 1842 and 1843. He entered Parliament as one of two representatives for the Ipswich constituency at the 1847 general election, and held the seat until his defeat at the 1868 general election.

== Family ==
Cobbold married Lucy, daughter of a rural rector, Henry Patteson, in 1827. They had eight sons and five daughters. Their sons included John, Thomas, Felix and Nathaniel, grandfather of Cameron Cobbold, 1st Baron Cobbold. Lucy died in 1879. Cobbold survived her by three years and died in October 1882, aged 85.

== Notes ==
Parliament of the United Kingdom
Preceded by John Neilson Gladstone; Sackville Lane-Fox	Member of Parliament for Ipswich; 1847–1868; With: Hugh Adair	Succeeded by Hugh Adair; Henry Wyndham-West
