= John Bernard (Ipswich MP) =

John Bernard (died 1421), was from Akenham, near Ipswich, Suffolk, England. He was a merchant, and one of the two Members of Parliament for Ipswich in January and September 1397, 1407 and 1411.

He married a woman named Juliana and they had a son, John Bernard, who was also an MP.
