= Peyton Ventris =

English judge and politician

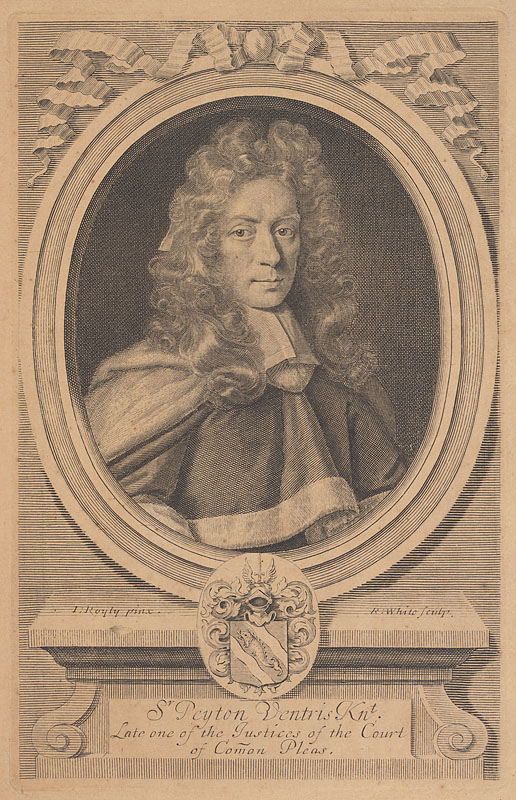
Sir Peyton Ventris.

Sir Peyton Ventris (November 1645 – 6 April 1691) was an English judge and politician, the first surviving son of Edward Ventris (died 1649) of the manor of Granhams (now Granhams Close), Great Shelford, Cambridgeshire, although he was born in Little Wenham, Suffolk.

Ventris entered Jesus College, Cambridge, on 4 July 1660, and like his father then moved to the Middle Temple on 3 February 1664. He was called to the bar on 2 June 1671, his chambers in Fleet Street being above Middle Temple. He was not a success as a pleader and turned to reporting. Ventris produced two volumes of reports which were published in 1696 after his death, they mainly concerned arguments in king's bench and common pleas.

Ventris married Margaret Whiting, daughter of Henry, a shipowner of Coggeshall, Essex, and of Ipswich, Suffolk. Ventris moved to Ipswich, and in 1681 he became the town clerk and one of three counsels to the corporation. When a new town charter was created in July 1684 he was not named and lost these civic offices.

In 1685 Ventris became a justice of the peace for Suffolk in 1685, and in 1687, he inherited extensive properties from his father-in-law.

He was elected as a Whig to one of Ipswich's seats in the Convention Parliament in January 1689 following the 1688 revolution. He took the oath as a serjeant-at-law on 2 May 1689, and a few days later the king made him a justice of common pleas on 4 May 1689. Ventris was knighted on 31 October 1689. He was living in parish of St Nicholas Ipswich in 1689.

After a long illness Ventris died on 6 April 1691 and was buried in the chancel of St Nicholas' Church, Ipswich, survived by his wife, his mother, five sons, and a daughter.

== Notes ==
Parliament of England
Preceded by Nicholas Bacon and Sir John Barker	Member of Parliament for Ipswich; 12 January 1689 – May 1689; With: Sir John Barker	Succeeded by Sir Charles Blois and Sir John Barker
