= 1938 Ipswich by-election =

UK Parliamentary by-election

The 1938 Ipswich by-election was held when the incumbent Conservative MP, Sir John Ganzoni, was elevated to the peerage. The Labour Party gained the seat from the Conservatives.

Ipswich by-election, 1938
Party	Candidate	Votes	%	±%
Labour	Richard Stokes	27,604	53.0	+10.3
Conservative	Henry Willink	24,443	47.0	−10.3
Majority		3,161	6.0	N/A
Turnout		52,047		
Labour gain from Conservative		Swing		
