= John Rous (Ipswich MP) =

English politician

John Rous was one of the two MPs for Ipswich in 1410 and November 1414. He was a merchant in the Staple of Calais and was survived by his widow, Joan.
