= William Weathereld =

William Weathereld was one of the two MPs for Ipswich in the English parliaments of December 1421 and 1429 and possibly the parliament of 1447.
