= William Debenham the elder =

William Debenham was a Member of Parliament and a merchant. His years of birth and death are unrecorded.

He was one of the two MPs for Ipswich in September 1397. His son, William Debenham the younger, was also an MP for Ipswich
