= Richard Wilson (Ipswich MP) =

English politician (1759–1834)

Richard Wilson (5 October 1759 – 7 June 1834) was an English politician who served as Member of Parliament (MP) for Ipswich from 1806 to 1807.

== Sources ==
- "House of Commons constituencies beginning with "I"". Leigh Rayment's House of Commons pages. Archived from the original on 10 August 2009.

Parliament of the United Kingdom
| Preceded by Sir Andrew Snape Hamond, Bt. with William Middleton | Member of Parliament for Ipswich; 1806–1807; With: Robert Stopford | Succeeded by Sir Home Riggs Popham with Robert Alexander Crickitt |
