= Thomas Kempstone =

Thomas Kempstone was one of the two MPs for Ipswich in the English parliament of December 1421.
