= Harry Wall =

Harry Wall may refer to:

- Harry Wall (American football), head football coach for the University of Richmond Spiders, 1904
- Harry Wall (politician) (1894–?), member of the Washington State Senate

== See also ==
- Harry Wahl (1869–1940), Finnish businessman
- Harry Wahl (politician) (1902–1975), Canadian politician
- Henry Wall (disambiguation)
