= Henry Poley =

English politician

Henry Poley (5 January 1654 – 7 August 1707) was an English lawyer and Member of Parliament. He was the son of Sir Edmund Poley (1619–1671) who was MP for Bury St Edmunds, and brother of Edmund Poley the diplomat.

Poley matriculated at Jesus College, Cambridge in 1672, and graduated B.A. in 1673, having been a fellow commoner since 1670. He was then a Fellow of the college to 1675. He entered Gray's Inn in 1669, and the Middle Temple in 1672, being called to the bar in 1678.

He represented Eye between 1689 and 1695, West Looe between 1703 and 1705, and Ipswich from 1705 until his death in 1707.

On 5 March 1707, Poley was reported to be "dangerously ill". He died on 7 August, aged 54, and was buried at Badley.

== Notes ==
Parliament of England
Preceded by Sir Charles Gawdy; Sir John Rous	Member of Parliament for Eye; 1689–1695; With: Thomas Knyvett 1689–1690; Thomas Davenant 1690–1695	Succeeded by Charles Cornwallis; Thomas Davenant
Preceded by The Earl of Ranelagh; Richard Hele	Member of Parliament for West Looe; 1703–1705; With: Charles Seymour	Succeeded by Sir Charles Hedges; John Mountstephen
Preceded by Charles Whitaker; John Bence	Member of Parliament for Ipswich; 1705–1707; With: John Bence	Succeeded by William Churchill; John Bence
