= Charles Mackinnon =

Charles Mackinnon was one of the two MPs for Ipswich in the United Kingdom Parliament from 1827 to 1831. He was a Tory.

Parliament of the United Kingdom
Preceded by William Haldimand; Robert Torrens	Member of Parliament for Ipswich; 1827–1831; With: Robert Dundas	Succeeded by James Morrison; Rigby Wason
