= Robert Nisbet-Hamilton =

British politician

The Right Honourable Robert Nisbet-Hamilton FRS JP

Chancellor of the Duchy of Lancaster
- In office 1 March 1852 – 17 December 1852
- Monarch: Victoria
- Prime Minister: The Earl of Derby
- Preceded by: The Earl of Carlisle
- Succeeded by: Edward Strutt

Personal details
- Born: 1804
- Died: 9 June 1877
- Party: Conservative
- Spouse: Lady Mary Bruce (d. 1883)

Robert Adam Nisbet-Hamilton (1804 – 9 June 1877), known as Robert Dundas until 1835 and as Robert Christopher between 1835 and 1855, was a British Conservative Party politician. He served as Chancellor of the Duchy of Lancaster under the Earl of Derby between March and December 1852.

== Background ==
Born Robert Dundas, he was the eldest son of Philip Dundas (c.1763–1807, the fourth son of Robert Dundas of Arniston, the younger), and Margaret (daughter of John Wedderburn of Ballendean (1729–1803) and sister of Sir David Wedderburn, 7th Baronet (1775–1858)).

He assumed the surname of Christopher in lieu of his patronymic in 1835 when his wife Lady Mary Bruce (see below) inherited the Christopher estates at Bloxholm and Wellvale in Lincolnshire. In 1855 he assumed the surname of Nisbet-Hamilton in lieu of Christopher after his wife succeeded to the Nisbet-Hamilton estates in Scotland, including Dirleton Castle and Archerfield House.

General Robert Manners left Bloxholm to his brother George, High Sheriff of Lincolnshire in 1826, whose death occurred in 1828. Both brothers having died unmarried, George left the estate to their dearest cousin, Mrs Jenney. She was the daughter of John, second Duke of Rutland, and sister of Lord Robert Manners, the father of Robert and George, making her their first cousin, once removed. However, Lady Mary Bruce, who was the brothers’ great niece, and eldest daughter of the 7th Earl of Elgin, contested the will, saying George had changed his will in her favour, and took the matter to court. A relative of the brothers wrote to the Editor of the Stamford Mercury on 26 March 1841 making it very clear that the family knew George wanted Bloxholm to go to Mrs Jenney, writing: for it is the opinion of all who are acquainted with the circumstances, that the testator would never have made an alteration had he been in the full possession of his faculties. The matter was settled in favour of Lady Mary Bruce.

== Political career ==
After a successful electoral petition against the General Election result Nisbet-Hamilton was returned to Parliament for Ipswich in 1827, a seat he held until 1831 and again briefly in 1835. He also represented Edinburgh between 1831 and 1832 and North Lincolnshire between 1837 and 1857. When the Conservatives came to power under the Earl of Derby in 1852, Nisbet-Hamilton was appointed Chancellor of the Duchy of Lancaster and sworn of the Privy Council. He remained as Chancellor of the Duchy of Lancaster until the government fell in December 1852.

In 1833 he was elected a Fellow of the Royal Society.

== Family ==
Nisbet-Hamilton married Lady Mary, daughter of General Thomas Bruce, 7th Earl of Elgin and Mary, daughter and heiress of William Hamilton Nisbet, in 1828. They had one daughter. Nisbet-Hamilton died in June 1877, Lady Mary survived him by six years, dying in December 1883.

== Notes ==
Parliament of the United Kingdom
Preceded by William Haldimand; Robert Torrens	Member of Parliament for Ipswich; 1827–1831; With: Charles Mackinnon	Succeeded by James Morrison; Rigby Wason
Preceded by William Dundas	Member of Parliament for Edinburgh; 1831–1832	Succeeded by Francis Jeffrey; Hon. James Abercromby
Preceded by James Morrison; Rigby Wason	Member of Parliament for Ipswich; 1835; With: Fitzroy Kelly	Succeeded by James Morrison; Rigby Wason
Preceded by Thomas George Corbett; Charles Anderson-Pelham	Member of Parliament for North Lincolnshire; 1837–1857; With: Charles Anderson-Pelham 1837–1847; Sir Montague Cholmeley, Bt 1847–1852; James Stanhope 1852–1857	Succeeded by Sir Montague Cholmeley, Bt; James Stanhope
Political offices
Preceded by The Earl of Carlisle	Chancellor of the Duchy of Lancaster; 1852	Succeeded by Edward Strutt
