= John More (MP for Ipswich) =

16th-century English politician

John More (died ca. 1588), of Ipswich and Little Brisset, Suffolk, was an English politician.

More was a member of parliament (MP) for Ipswich in 1571.

More's daughter, Elizabeth Walter, established the Elizabeth Walter Charity, for the religious education of children, young people and adults.
