= Thomas Rush =

Sir Thomas Rush (or Russhe) (by 1487 – June 1537), born in Sudbourne, Suffolk, England, was an English sergeant-at-arms who served Henry VII and Henry VIII and was knighted by the latter at the coronation of Anne Boleyn in 1533. He was also appointed High Sheriff of Norfolk and Suffolk in 1533.

== Career ==
Thomas Rush was a local politician in Ipswich who had served Henry VII as well as his son Henry VIII. He was a friend of Cardinal Wolsey (Henry VIII's first Lord Chancellor), survived the fallout from Wolsey's downfall, and attached himself to Wolsey's successor Thomas Cromwell. He was one of the King's sergeants-at-arms, the forerunners of the Yeomen of the Guard ("Beefeaters"); Debrett's Knightage says that he was one of those made a "Knight of the Bath" as part of the coronation ceremonies of Anne Boleyn.

== Family ==
Sir Thomas married Anne Rivers, daughter of John Rivers of Ipswich and widow of Thomas Alvard (1460-1504). Together they had six children: Arthur, Thomas, Leonard, Anthony, John, and a daughter named Thomasine. Leonard and John did not survive infancy. Sir Thomas later married a woman named Christian, but produced no more children.

== Legacy ==
Sir Thomas is interred in St. Stephen's Church in Ipswich, which no longer functions as a church.

A popular misconception is that Sir Thomas' most famous name-bearing descendant is Dr. Benjamin Rush, signer of the Declaration of Independence in 1776. Dr. Rush is Sir Thomas' descendant through the latter's eponymous son.
