= John Bence (1670–1718) =

English politician (1670–1718)

John Bence (27 September 1670 – 18 October 1718, Heveningham) was an English politician active in Suffolk, serving as a member of parliament for Dunwich and Ipswich.

Parliament of England
Preceded by Richard Phillips with Charles Whitaker	Member of Parliament for Ipswich; 1702–1708; With: Charles Whitaker; Henry Poley; William Churchill	Succeeded by Sir William Barker with William Churchill
Preceded by Philip Skippon with Sir Robert Rich	Member of Parliament for Dunwich; 1691–1695; With: Sir Robert Rich	Succeeded by Henry Heveningham with Sir Robert Rich
