= Ipswich (constituency) =

Parliamentary constituency in the United Kingdom, 1295 onwards

Coordinates: 52.06°N 1.16°E

- Borough constituency for the House of Commons
- Interactive map of boundaries since 2010
- Location within the East of England
- County: Suffolk
- Electorate: 75,117 (March 2020)
- Major settlements: Ipswich

Current constituency
- Created: 1295
- Member of Parliament: Jack Abbott (Labour Party)
- Seats: One

Ipswich (/ˈɪpswɪtʃ/) is a constituency (Note: A borough constituency (for the purposes of election expenses and type of returning officer).) represented in the House of Commons of the UK Parliament since July 2024 by Jack Abbott of the Labour Party. (Note: As with all constituencies, the constituency elects one Member of Parliament (MP) by the first past the post system of election at least every five years.)

== Constituency profile ==
The Ipswich constituency is located in Suffolk and covers most of the large town of Ipswich, excluding some outer suburbs. Ipswich is a historic town based around the Port of Ipswich, which dates back to the 7th century. Ipswich is an important commercial centre for the largely agricultural county of Suffolk, and is the county's largest town. The constituency contains the main campus of the University of Suffolk, which has around 14,000 students. The constituency has high levels of deprivation, particularly in the centre and west of the town. The north and east of the town have higher levels of wealth; the suburb of California is especially affluent. House prices in the constituency are lower than the national average and considerably lower than the rest of the East of England.

In general, residents of the constituency are young and have low levels of education and homeownership. Household income is below average. Few residents work in professional occupations and a high proportion work in healthcare. White people made up 83% of the population at the 2021 census, an identical figure to the country as a whole. Ipswich is the only place in Suffolk to be represented by Labour Party councillors at the county council. At the borough council, most seats in the constituency are also represented by the Labour Party except the more affluent eastern suburbs, which elected Conservatives. An estimated 57% of voters in Ipswich supported leaving the European Union in the 2016 referendum, higher than the nationwide figure of 52%.

== History ==
The constituency was created as Parliamentary Borough in the fourteenth century, returning two MPs to the House of Commons of England until 1707, then to the House of Commons of Great Britain until 1800, and from 1801 to the House of Commons of the United Kingdom. The constituency's parliamentary representation was reduced to a single seat with one MP under the Representation of the People Act 1918. Prior to the 1983 general election, when north-western areas were transferred to the Central Suffolk constituency, the Parliamentary and Municipal/County Boroughs were the same

Before the Reform Act 1832, the franchise in Ipswich was in the hands of the Ipswich Corporation and the Freemen. Ipswich was seen as a partisan seat with active Blue (Tory inclined) and Yellow (Whig inclined) factions dominating elections for both Parliament and the corporation and comparatively rare split tickets of one Whig and one Tory being returned to Parliament, although the identification of the local parties with national parties could at times be very blurred. In the mid eighteenth century the constituency had an electorate of around 700, which was a middle sized borough by the standards of the time – and a reputation of a borough that was likely to offer stiff opposition to government favoured candidates.

Ipswich is a marginal seat, having changed hands eleven times since its creation as a single-member constituency in 1918. It has generally been favourable to Labour Party candidates, who succeeded at every postwar general election since the end of World War II except 1970, February 1974, 1987, 2010, 2015 and 2019. It was traditionally won by either party by fairly small margins; however, from 1997 until being gained by the Conservative Party in 2010, Labour won the contests with safer margins, and after the Conservatives increased their majority in 2015, Labour regained the seat in 2017 only to lose it again in 2019 when the Conservative candidate got more than half the votes cast when there were more than two candidates for the first time since 1918. This was turned around in 2024 when Labour won the seat once again with a healthy majority of 16.8%

Ipswich was the only seat won by a Labour candidate at the 2017 general election from a total of seven seats in Suffolk, the others being retained by Conservatives and more rural in comparison to Ipswich. Martin's 2017 election victory was one of thirty net gains made by the Labour Party.

== Boundaries ==
=== Historic ===
==== 1918–1983 ====
- The County Borough of Ipswich.

==== 1983–2010 ====
- The Borough of Ipswich wards of Bixley, Bridge, Chantry, Gainsborough, Priory Heath, Rushmere, St Clement's, St John's, St Margaret's, Sprites, Stoke Park, and Town.

=== Current (from 2010) ===
- The Borough of Ipswich wards of Alexandra, Bixley, Bridge, Gainsborough, Gipping, Holywells, Priory Heath, Rushmere, St John's, St Margaret's, Sprites, Stoke Park, and Westgate.

Following a revision of the Borough of Ipswich wards, the constituency gained a small area from Central Suffolk and North Ipswich.

The 2023 review of Westminster constituencies left the boundaries unchanged.

The present-day constituency consists of the Borough of Ipswich, with the exception of the Castle Hill, Whitehouse and Whitton wards, which are included in Central Suffolk and North Ipswich.

== Members of Parliament ==
Freemen belonging to the Ipswich Corporation were entitled to elect two burgesses to the Parliament of England from the fourteenth century which continued uninterrupted after the parliament united with Scotland and Ireland, only becoming a single member constituency in 1918.

=== MPs 1386–1660 ===
Parliament	First member	Second member
1380	William Master	?
1385	William Master	?
1386	Geoffrey Starling	Robert Waleys
1388 (Feb)	Geoffrey Starling	Robert Waleys
1388 (Sep)	John Arnold	Robert Waleys
1390 (Jan)	Geoffrey Starling	Robert Hethe
1390 (Nov)		
1391	Geoffrey Starling	Robert Andrew
1393	?Geoffrey Starling	?Robert Andrew
1394	John Arnold	Henry Wall
1395	Geoffrey Starling	William Master
1397 (Jan)	John Arnold	John Bernard
1397 (Sep)	William Debenham	John Bernard
1399	John Arnold	John Lewe
1401		
1402	Richard Church	John Starling
1404 (Jan)		
1404 (Oct)		
1406	Robert Lucas	John Starling
1407	John Felbrigg	John Bernard
1410	John Rous	James Andrew
1411	John Bernard	John Starling
1413 (Feb)		
1413 (May)	James Andrew	John Starling
1414 (Apr)		
1414 (Nov)	William Debenham I	John Rous
1415		
1416 (Mar)		
1416 (Oct)		
1417	William Debenham II	James Andrew
1419	William Debenham II	James Andrew
1420	John Knepping	John Wood
1421 (May)	William Debenham II	James Andrew
1421 (Dec)	Thomas Kempstone II	William Weatherfeld
1449	Richard Felaw	
1455	Sir Gilbert Debenham	
1460-1462	Richard Felaw	
1510	Thomas Hall	William Spencer
1512	Thomas Baldry	Edmund Daundy
1515	Thomas Baldry	Edmund Daundy
1523	Humphrey Wingfield	Thomas Rush
1529	Thomas Rush	Thomas Hayward, died and replaced Nov 1534 by Thomas Alvard (1493-1535)
1536	?	
1539	Robert Daundy	William Sabine
1542	Ralph Goodwin	John Sparrow
1545	William Reynball	Richard Smart
1547	John Gosnold	John Smith alias Dyer
1553 (Mar)	John Smith alias Dyer	Richard Bryde alias Byrde
1553 (Oct)	John Gosnold	John Sulyard
1554 (Apr)	Clement Heigham	Thomas Poley
1554 (Nov)	Ralph Goodwin	John Smith alias Dyer
1555	John Sulyard	Richard Smart
1558	William Wheatcroft, repl. Nov 1558 by Edmund Withypoll	Philip Williams
1558/9	Thomas Seckford I	Robert Barker
1562/3	Thomas Seckford I	Edward Grimston
1571	Edward Grimston	John More
1572	Thomas Seckford I	Edward Grimston
1584 (Nov)	Sir John Heigham	John Barker
1586 (Oct)	John Barker	John Laney
1588 (Oct)	John Barker	William Smarte
1593	Robert Barker	Zachariah Lok
1597 (Oct)	Michael Stanhope	Francis Bacon
1601 (Oct)	Michael Stanhope	Francis Bacon
1604	Sir Henry Glenham	Sir Francis Bacon
1614	Robert Snelling	William Cage
1621	Robert Snelling	William Cage
1624	Sir Robert Snelling	William Cage
1625	Sir Robert Snelling	William Cage
1628	William Cage	Edmund Day
1629–1640	No Parliaments convened	
1640 (Apr)	John Gurdon	William Cage
1640 (Nov)	John Gurdon	William Cage
1645	John Gurdon	Francis Bacon
1648	John Gurdon	Francis Bacon
1653	Not represented in Barebones Parliament	
1654	Nathaniel Bacon	Francis Bacon
1656	Nathaniel Bacon	Francis Bacon
1659	Nathaniel Bacon	Francis Bacon

=== MPs 1660–1832 ===
Election	First member	First party	Second member	Second party
Apr 1660	Nathaniel Bacon		Francis Bacon	
Oct 1660	Sir Frederick Cornwallis, Bt		Francis Bacon	
Apr 1661	John Sicklemore		William Blois	
Nov 1670	John Wright		William Blois	
Jan 1674	John Wright		Gilbert Lindfield	
Dec 1680	John Wright		Sir John Barker, Bt	Tory
Mar 1685	Sir Nicholas Bacon	Tory	Sir John Barker, Bt	Tory
Jan 1689	Sir Peyton Ventris	Whig	Sir John Barker, Bt	Tory
May 1689	Sir Charles Blois, Bt	Tory	Sir John Barker, Bt	Tory
Oct 1695	Charles Whitaker	Whig	Sir John Barker, Bt	Tory
Nov 1696	Charles Whitaker	Whig	Richard Phillips	Tory
Jul 1698	Sir Samuel Barnardiston, Bt	Whig	Richard Phillips	Tory
Jan 1701	Joseph Martin	Whig	Sir Charles Duncombe	Tory
Dec 1701	Charles Whitaker	Whig	Richard Phillips	Tory
Jul 1702	Charles Whitaker	Whig	John Bence	Tory
May 1705	Henry Poley	Tory	John Bence	Tory
Nov 1707	William Churchill	Whig	John Bence	Tory
May 1708	William Churchill	Whig	Sir William Barker, Bt	Tory
Sep 1713	William Churchill	Whig	William Thompson	Whig
Apr 1714	Richard Richardson	Tory	Orlando Bridgeman	Tory
Jan 1715	William Thompson	Whig	William Churchill	Whig
Dec 1717	William Thompson	Whig	Francis Negus	Whig
Jan 1730	Philip Broke	Tory	Francis Negus	Whig
Jan 1733	Philip Broke	Tory	William Wollaston	Whig
Apr 1734	Samuel Kent	Whig	William Wollaston	Whig
May 1741	Samuel Kent	Whig	Edward Vernon	Tory
Dec 1757	Samuel Kent	Whig	Thomas Staunton	Whig
Nov 1759	George Montgomerie	Whig	Thomas Staunton	Whig
Mar 1761	Francis Vernon	Whig	Thomas Staunton	Whig
Mar 1768	William Wollaston	Whig	Thomas Staunton	Whig
Apr 1784	William Middleton	Tory	John Cator declared void	Whig
Jun 1784	William Middleton	Tory	Charles Crickitt	Tory
Jun 1790	Sir John D'Oyly	Whig	Charles Crickitt	Tory
May 1796	Sir Andrew Hamond	Tory	Charles Crickitt	Tory
Feb 1803	Sir Andrew Hamond	Tory	William Middleton	
Oct 1806	Richard Wilson	Whig	Robert Stopford	Whig
May 1807	Sir Home Riggs Popham	Tory	Robert Alexander Crickitt	Tory
Oct 1812	John Round	Tory	Robert Alexander Crickitt	Tory
Jul 1818	William Newton	Tory	Robert Alexander Crickitt	Tory
Apr 1820	William Haldimand	Whig	Thomas Barrett-Lennard	Whig
Jun 1826	William Haldimand	Whig	Robert Torrens	Whig
Feb 1827	Robert Dundas	Tory	Charles Mackinnon	Tory
May 1831	James Morrison	Whig	Rigby Wason	Whig

=== MPs 1832–1918 ===
Election	First member	First party	Second member	Second party
1832	James Morrison	Whig	Rigby Wason	Whig
1835	Fitzroy Kelly	Conservative	Robert Christopher	Conservative
June 1835	James Morrison	Whig	Rigby Wason	Whig
1837	Thomas Milner Gibson	Conservative	Henry Tufnell	Whig
Feb. 1838	Thomas Milner Gibson	Conservative	Fitzroy Kelly	Conservative
July 1839	Sir Thomas John Cochrane	Conservative	Fitzroy Kelly	Conservative
1841	Rigby Wason	Whig	George Rennie	Whig
June 1842	John Cuffe	Conservative	Thomas Gladstone	Conservative
August 1842	John Neilson Gladstone	Conservative	Sackville Lane-Fox	Conservative
1847	John Cobbold	Conservative	Sir Hugh Adair, Bt	Whig
1859	John Cobbold	Conservative	Sir Hugh Adair, Bt	Liberal
1868	Henry Wyndham West	Liberal	Sir Hugh Adair, Bt	Liberal
1874	John Cobbold	Conservative	James Redfoord Bulwer	Conservative
1876	Thomas Cobbold	Conservative	James Redfoord Bulwer	Conservative
1880	Thomas Cobbold	Conservative	Jesse Collings	Liberal
December 1883	Henry Wyndham West	Liberal	Jesse Collings	Liberal
April 1886	Sir Charles Dalrymple, Bt	Conservative	Hugo Chatteris	Conservative
1895	Sir Charles Dalrymple, Bt	Conservative	Sir Daniel Ford Goddard	Liberal
1906	Felix Cobbold	Liberal	Sir Daniel Ford Goddard	Liberal
January 1910	Silvester Horne	Liberal	Sir Daniel Ford Goddard	Liberal
May 1914	John Ganzoni	Conservative	Sir Daniel Ford Goddard	Liberal

During the period between 1835 and 1842 there were five elections and all were found to have been corrupt. After the 1835 election, Dundas and Kelly were unseated on the charge of bribery. After the 1837 election, Tufnell was unseated on a scrutiny. Gibson, who was elected in 1838, resigned. Cochrane was elected in 1839, after which a petition was presented complaining of gross bribery – it was not progressed because a general election was expected. After the 1841 election, Wason and Rennie were unseated, being declared guilty of bribery by their agents.

=== MPs 1918–present ===
Election	Member	Party
1918	John Ganzoni	Coalition Conservative
1922	John Ganzoni	Conservative
1923	Robert Jackson	Labour
1924	Sir John Ganzoni, Bt	Conservative
1938 by-election	Richard Stokes	Labour
1957 by-election	Dingle Foot	Labour
1970	Ernle Money	Conservative
October 1974	Kenneth Weetch	Labour
1987	Michael Irvine	Conservative
1992	Jamie Cann	Labour
2001 by-election	Chris Mole	Labour
2010	Ben Gummer	Conservative
2017	Sandy Martin	Labour
2019	Tom Hunt	Conservative
2024	Jack Abbott	Labour Co-op

== Elections ==
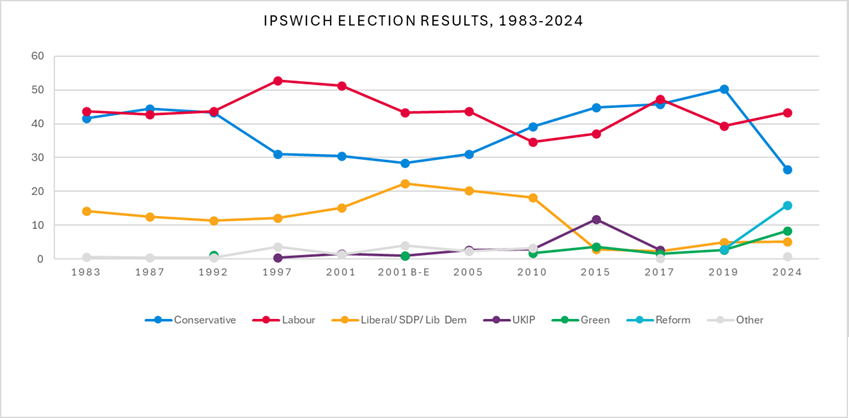
Ipswich election results 1983-2024

=== Elections in the 2020s ===
General election 2024: Ipswich
Party	Candidate	Votes	%	±%
Labour Co-op	Jack Abbott	19,099	43.3	+4.0
Conservative	Tom Hunt	11,696	26.5	–23.8
Reform	Tony Love	7,027	15.9	+13.0
Green	Adria Pittock	3,652	8.3	+5.7
Liberal Democrats	James Sandbach	2,241	5.1	+0.2
Communist	Freddie Sofar	205	0.5	N/A
Heritage	Terence Charles	151	0.3	N/A
Majority		7,403	16.8	N/A
Turnout		44,071	57.8	–7.8
Registered electors		76,319		
Labour gain from Conservative		Swing	▲13.9	

=== Elections in the 2010s ===
General election 2019: Ipswich
Party	Candidate	Votes	%	±%
Conservative	Tom Hunt	24,952	50.3	+4.6
Labour	Sandy Martin	19,473	39.3	–8.1
Liberal Democrats	Adrian Hyyrylainen-Trett	2,439	4.9	+2.6
Brexit Party	Nicola Thomas	1,432	2.9	N/A
Green	Barry Broom	1,283	2.6	+1.0
Majority		5,479	11.0	N/A
Turnout		49,579	65.6	–2.0
Conservative gain from Labour		Swing	+6.3	

General election 2017: Ipswich
Party	Candidate	Votes	%	±%
Labour	Sandy Martin	24,224	47.4	+10.3
Conservative	Ben Gummer	23,393	45.7	+0.9
UKIP	Tony Gould	1,372	2.7	–9.0
Liberal Democrats	Adrian Hyyrylainen-Trett	1,187	2.3	–0.6
Green	Charlotte Armstrong	840	1.6	–2.0
Independent	David Tabane	121	0.2	N/A
Majority		831	1.7	N/A
Turnout		51,137	67.6	+2.2
Labour gain from Conservative		Swing	+4.7	

General election 2015: Ipswich
Party	Candidate	Votes	%	±%
Conservative	Ben Gummer	21,794	44.8	+5.7
Labour	David Ellesmere	18,061	37.1	+2.4
UKIP	Maria Vigneau	5,703	11.7	+8.8
Green	Barry Broom	1,736	3.6	+1.9
Liberal Democrats	Chika Akinwale	1,400	2.9	−15.3
Majority		3,733	7.7	+3.3
Turnout		48,694	65.4	+5.5
Conservative hold		Swing	+1.6	

General election 2010: Ipswich
Party	Candidate	Votes	%	±%
Conservative	Ben Gummer	18,371	39.1	+8.0
Labour	Chris Mole	16,292	34.7	−8.2
Liberal Democrats	Mark Dyson	8,556	18.2	−2.9
UKIP	Chris Streatfield	1,365	2.9	+0.2
BNP	Dennis Boater	1,270	2.7	N/A
Green	Tim Glover	775	1.7	N/A
Christian	Kim Christofi	149	0.3	N/A
Independent	Peter Turtill	93	0.2	N/A
Independent	Sally Wainman	70	0.1	N/A
Majority		2,079	4.4	N/A
Turnout		46,941	59.9	−0.2
Conservative gain from Labour		Swing	+8.1	

=== Elections in the 2000s ===
General election 2005: Ipswich
Party	Candidate	Votes	%	±%
Labour	Chris Mole	18,336	43.8	−7.5
Conservative	Paul West	13,004	31.1	+0.6
Liberal Democrats	Richard Atkins	8,464	20.2	+5.0
UKIP	Alison West	1,134	2.7	+1.1
English Democrat	Jervis Kay	641	1.5	N/A
Independent	Sally Wainman	299	0.7	N/A
Majority		5,332	12.7	−8.1
Turnout		41,878	60.8	+3.8
Labour hold		Swing	−4.0	

Following the death of Jamie Cann on 15 October 2001, a by-election was held on 22 November 2001.

2001 Ipswich by-election
Party	Candidate	Votes	%	±%
Labour	Chris Mole	11,881	43.4	−7.9
Conservative	Paul West	7,794	28.4	−2.1
Liberal Democrats	Tessa Munt	6,146	22.4	+7.2
CPA	David Coope	581	2.1	N/A
UKIP	Jonathan Wright	276	1.0	−0.6
Green	Tony Slade	255	0.9	N/A
Legalise Cannabis	John Ramirez	236	0.9	N/A
Socialist Alliance	Peter Leech	152	0.6	0.0
English Independence Party	Nicolas Winskill	84	0.3	N/A
Majority		4,087	15.0	−5.8
Turnout		27,405	40.2	−16.8
Labour hold		Swing	−5.9	

General election 2001: Ipswich
Party	Candidate	Votes	%	±%
Labour	Jamie Cann	19,952	51.3	−1.4
Conservative	Edward Wild	11,871	30.5	−0.6
Liberal Democrats	Terence Gilbert	5,904	15.2	+3.0
UKIP	William Vinyard	624	1.6	+1.2
Socialist Alliance	Peter Leech	305	0.8	N/A
Socialist Labour	Shaun Gratton	217	0.6	N/A
Majority		8,081	20.8	−0.8
Turnout		38,873	57.0	−15.2
Labour hold		Swing	−0.8	

=== Elections in the 1990s ===
General election 1997: Ipswich
Party	Candidate	Votes	%	±%
Labour	Jamie Cann	25,484	52.7	+8.9
Conservative	Stephen Castle	15,048	31.1	−12.3
Liberal Democrats	Nigel Roberts	5,881	12.2	+0.8
Referendum	Theodore Agnew	1,637	3.4	N/A
UKIP	William Vinyard	208	0.4	N/A
Natural Law	Eric Kaplan	107	0.2	−0.1
Majority		10,436	21.6	+21.2
Turnout		48,365	72.2	−8.1
Labour hold		Swing	+10.5	

General election 1992: Ipswich
Party	Candidate	Votes	%	±%
Labour	Jamie Cann	23,680	43.8	+1.1
Conservative	Michael Irvine	23,415	43.4	−1.0
Liberal Democrats	Joseph White	6159	11.4	−1.1
Green	Jane Scott	591	1.1	N/A
Natural Law	Eric Kaplan	181	0.3	N/A
Majority		265	0.4	N/A
Turnout		54,026	80.3	+3.2
Labour gain from Conservative		Swing	+1.1	

=== Elections in the 1980s ===
General election 1987: Ipswich
Party	Candidate	Votes	%	±%
Conservative	Michael Irvine	23,328	44.4	+2.8
Labour	Ken Weetch	22,454	42.7	−1.0
SDP	Hugh Nicholson	6,596	12.5	−1.7
Workers Revolutionary	David Lettice	174	0.3	N/A
Majority		874	1.7	N/A
Turnout		52,552	77.1	+1.7
Conservative gain from Labour		Swing	+1.9	

General election 1983: Ipswich
Party	Candidate	Votes	%	±%
Labour	Ken Weetch	22,191	43.7	
Conservative	Elizabeth Cottrell	21,114	41.6	
Liberal	Patricia Miernik	7,220	14.2	
BNP	Albert Pearson	235	0.5	N/A
Majority		1,077	2.1	
Turnout		50,760	75.4	
Labour hold		Swing		

=== Elections in the 1970s ===
General election 1979: Ipswich
Party	Candidate	Votes	%	±%
Labour	Ken Weetch	34,444	48.2	+2.9
Conservative	R. Erith	30,703	42.9	+0.1
Liberal	P. Keeling	5,772	8.1	−3.8
National Front	P. Robinson	449	0.6	N/A
Workers Revolutionary	R. Hodge	115	0.2	N/A
Majority		3,741	5.3	+2.8
Turnout		71,483	80.8	+1.3
Labour hold		Swing	+1.3	

General election October 1974: Ipswich
Party	Candidate	Votes	%	±%
Labour	Ken Weetch	31,566	45.3	+4.5
Conservative	Ernle Money	29,833	42.8	+1.6
Liberal	R. B. Salt	8,295	11.9	−4.4
Majority		1,733	2.5	N/A
Turnout		69,694	79.5	−4.1
Labour gain from Conservative		Swing		

General election February 1974: Ipswich
Party	Candidate	Votes	%	±%
Conservative	Ernle Money	29,893	41.2	−2.9
Labour	Ken Weetch	29,634	40.8	−3.3
Liberal	Joan Ruby Knott	11,857	16.3	+8.1
National Democratic	David R. M. Brown	1,161	1.6	−2.1
Majority		259	0.4	+0.4
Turnout		72,545	83.6	+10.9
Conservative hold		Swing		

General election 1970: Ipswich
Party	Candidate	Votes	%	±%
Conservative	Ernle Money	27,704	44.1	+5.5
Labour	Dingle Foot	27,691	44.1	−5.8
Liberal	Neville S. Lewis	5,147	8.2	−2.0
National Democratic	David R. M. Brown	2,322	3.7	+2.4
Majority		13	0.0	N/A
Turnout		62,864	72.7	−4.8
Conservative gain from Labour		Swing		

=== Elections in the 1960s ===
General election 1966: Ipswich
Party	Candidate	Votes	%	±%
Labour	Dingle Foot	30,313	49.9	+10.1
Conservative	Trevor A. Hagger	23,440	38.6	+2.8
Liberal	Stanley Rundle	6,200	10.2	−13.6
National Democratic	David R. M. Brown	769	1.3	+0.7
Majority		6,873	11.3	+9.4
Turnout		60,722	77.5	−1.5
Labour hold		Swing		

General election 1964: Ipswich
Party	Candidate	Votes	%	±%
Labour	Dingle Foot	24,648	39.8	−1.3
Conservative	Trevor A. Hagger	22,216	35.8	−0.2
Liberal	Manuela Sykes	14,755	23.8	+1.0
National Democratic	David R. M. Brown	349	0.6	N/A
Majority		2,432	3.9	−1.2
Turnout		61,968	79.0	−1.9
Labour hold		Swing	−0.5	

=== Elections in the 1950s ===
General election 1959: Ipswich
Party	Candidate	Votes	%	±%
Labour	Dingle Foot	25,858	41.1	−4.7
Conservative	John C. Cobbold	22,623	36.0	+3.4
Liberal	Manuela Sykes	14,359	22.8	+1.4
Majority		3,235	5.1	−8.1
Turnout		62,840	80.9	+0.4
Labour hold		Swing	−4.0	

1957 Ipswich by-election
Party	Candidate	Votes	%	±%
Labour	Dingle Foot	26,898	45.8	−7.1
Conservative	John C. Cobbold	19,161	32.6	−14.5
Liberal	Manuela Sykes	12,587	21.4	N/A
Majority		7,737	13.2	+7.4
Turnout		27,405		
Labour hold		Swing	+3.7	

General election 1955: Ipswich
Party	Candidate	Votes	%	±%
Labour	Richard Stokes	32,306	52.9	−0.5
Conservative	John C. Cobbold	28,724	47.1	+0.5
Majority		3,582	5.8	−1.0
Turnout		61,030	80.5	−4.7
Labour hold		Swing		

General election 1951: Ipswich
Party	Candidate	Votes	%	±%
Labour	Richard Stokes	33,463	53.4	+6.5
Conservative	Albert E. Holdsworth	29,227	46.6	+6.8
Majority		4,236	6.8	−0.3
Turnout		62,690	85.2	−1.6
Labour hold		Swing		

General election 1950: Ipswich
Party	Candidate	Votes	%	±%
Labour	Richard Stokes	29,386	46.9	−2.4
Conservative	S. W. L. Ripley	24,993	39.8	+5.7
Liberal	J. C. Seward	8,340	13.3	−3.2
Majority		4,393	7.1	−8.1
Turnout		62,719	86.8	+6.7
Labour hold		Swing		

=== Election in the 1940s ===
General election 1945: Ipswich
Party	Candidate	Votes	%	±%
Labour	Richard Stokes	26,296	49.3	+6.6
Conservative	Frank Guy Clavering Fison	18,177	34.1	−23.2
Liberal	Duncan Mackay Mowat	8,819	16.5	N/A
Majority		8,119	15.2	N/A
Turnout		53,292	80.1	−2.0
Labour gain from Conservative		Swing		

=== Elections in the 1930s ===
1938 Ipswich by-election
Party	Candidate	Votes	%	±%
Labour	Richard Stokes	27,604	53.0	+10.3
Conservative	Henry Willink	24,443	47.0	−10.3
Majority		3,161	6.0	N/A
Turnout		52,047		
Labour gain from Conservative		Swing		

General election 1935: Ipswich
Party	Candidate	Votes	%	±%
Conservative	John Ganzoni	28,528	57.3	−5.7
Labour	Robert Jackson	21,278	42.7	+5.7
Majority		7,250	14.6	−11.4
Turnout		49,806	82.1	−0.8
Conservative hold		Swing		

General election 1931: Ipswich
Party	Candidate	Votes	%	±%
Conservative	John Ganzoni	29,782	63.0	+23.3
Labour	Robert Jackson	17,490	37.0	−0.7
Majority		12,292	26.0	+24.0
Turnout		47,272	82.9	−2.8
Conservative hold		Swing		

=== Elections in the 1920s ===
General election 1929: Ipswich
Party	Candidate	Votes	%	±%
Unionist	John Ganzoni	18,527	39.7	−15.7
Labour	Robert Jackson	17,592	37.7	−6.9
Liberal	Frank Ongley Darvall	10,559	22.6	N/A
Majority		935	2.0	−8.8
Turnout		46,678	85.7	−2.0
Registered electors		54,474		
Unionist hold		Swing	−4.4	

General election 1924: Ipswich
Party	Candidate	Votes	%	±%
Unionist	John Ganzoni	19,621	55.4	+6.1
Labour	Robert Jackson	15,791	44.6	−6.1
Majority		3,830	10.8	N/A
Turnout		35,412	87.7	+9.0
Registered electors		40,379		
Unionist gain from Labour		Swing	+6.1	

General election 1923: Ipswich
Party	Candidate	Votes	%	±%
Labour	Robert Jackson	15,824	50.7	+4.1
Unionist	John Ganzoni	15,364	49.3	−4.1
Majority		460	1.4	N/A
Turnout		31,188	78.7	−3.7
Registered electors		39,606		
Labour gain from Unionist		Swing	+4.1	

General election 1922: Ipswich
Party	Candidate	Votes	%	±%
Unionist	John Ganzoni	17,134	53.4	−0.1
Labour	Robert Jackson	14,924	46.6	+14.5
Majority		2,210	6.8	−14.6
Turnout		32,058	82.4	+14.5
Registered electors		38,924		
Unionist hold		Swing	−7.3	

=== Elections in the 1910s ===
General election 1918: Ipswich
Party		Candidate	Votes	%	±%
C	Unionist	John Ganzoni	13,553	53.5	+5.4
	Labour	Robert Jackson	8,143	32.1	N/A
	Liberal	George Hay Morgan	3,663	14.4	−37.5
Majority			5,410	21.4	N/A
Turnout			25,359	67.9	−22.0
Registered electors			37,348		
	Unionist hold		Swing		
C indicates candidate endorsed by the coalition government.

- Change of vote share and swing calculated from the December 1910 party ticket vote.

General election 1914/15:

Another general election was required to take place before the end of 1915. The political parties had been making preparations for an election to take place and by July 1914, the following candidates had been selected;

- Unionist: John Ganzoni
- Liberal: Daniel Ford Goddard
- Independent Labour: Robert Jackson (not supported by Labour Party HQ)

John Ganzoni

1914 Ipswich by-election
Party	Candidate	Votes	%	±%
Unionist	John Ganzoni	6,406	50.6	+2.5
Liberal	Charles Masterman	5,874	46.3	−5.6
Independent Labour	John Scurr	395	3.1	N/A
Majority		532	4.3	N/A
Turnout		12,675	91.4	+1.5
Registered electors		13,870		
Unionist gain from Liberal		Swing	+4.1	

Goddard

General election December 1910: Ipswich (2 seats)
Party	Candidate	Votes	%	±%
Liberal	Daniel Ford Goddard	5,931	26.2	+0.1
Liberal	Silvester Horne	5,791	25.7	+0.2
Conservative	Arthur Churchman	5,447	24.1	−0.2
Conservative	Bunnell Henry Burton	5,409	24.0	−0.1
Turnout		22,578	89.9	−3.4
Registered electors		12,641		
Majority		344	1.6	+0.4
Liberal hold		Swing	+0.2	
Liberal hold		Swing	+0.2	

Liberal Election Postcard

General election January 1910: Ipswich (2 seats)
Party	Candidate	Votes	%	±%
Liberal	Daniel Ford Goddard	6,120	26.1	−3.7
Liberal	Silvester Horne	5,958	25.5	−3.7
Conservative	Arthur Churchman	5,690	24.3	+3.0
Conservative	Bunnell Henry Burton	5,645	24.1	+4.4
Turnout		23,413	93.3	+3.9
Registered electors		12,641		
Majority		268	1.2	−6.7
Liberal hold		Swing	−3.4	
Liberal hold		Swing	−4.1	

=== Elections in the 1900s ===
Felix Cobbold

General election 1906: Ipswich
Party	Candidate	Votes	%	±%
Liberal	Daniel Ford Goddard	6,396	29.8	+3.9
Liberal	Felix Cobbold	6,290	29.2	+3.8
Conservative	Charles Dalrymple	4,591	21.3	−4.5
Conservative	Samuel Hoare	4,232	19.7	−4.2
Majority		1,699	7.9	+5.9
Turnout		21,509	89.4	+5.8
Registered electors		12,146		
Liberal hold		Swing	+4.2	
Liberal gain from Conservative		Swing	+4.2	

General election 1900: Ipswich
Party	Candidate	Votes	%	±%
Liberal	Daniel Ford Goddard	4,557	25.9	+0.3
Conservative	Charles Dalrymple	4,527	25.8	+0.8
Liberal	Noel Buxton	4,283	24.4	−0.4
Conservative	J. F. P. Rawlinson	4,207	23.9	−0.7
Turnout		17,574	83.6	−6.8
Registered electors		10,646		
Majority		350	2.0	+1.0
Liberal hold		Swing	−0.5	
Majority		244	1.4	+1.2
Conservative hold		Swing	+0.6	

=== Elections in the 1890s ===
General election 1895: Ipswich
Party	Candidate	Votes	%	±%
Liberal	Daniel Ford Goddard	4,396	25.6	+1.1
Conservative	Charles Dalrymple	4,293	25.0	−1.2
Liberal	Arthur Soames	4,250	24.8	+1.3
Conservative	Hugo Charteris	4,219	24.6	−1.2
Turnout		8,696 (est.)	90.4	+0.7
Registered electors		9,619		
Majority		177	1.0	N/A
Liberal gain from Conservative		Swing	+1.2	
Majority		43	0.2	−1.1
Conservative hold		Swing	−1.3	

General election 1892: Ipswich
Party	Candidate	Votes	%	±%
Conservative	Charles Dalrymple	4,350	26.2	−0.4
Conservative	Hugo Charteris	4,277	25.8	−0.9
Liberal	Daniel Ford Goddard	4,054	24.5	+1.0
Liberal	Arthur Soames	3,888	23.5	+0.3
Turnout		8,417 (est.)	89.7	+7.9
Registered electors		9,619		
Majority		223	1.3	−1.8
Conservative hold		Swing	−0.7	
Conservative hold		Swing	−0.6	

=== Elections in the 1880s ===
General election 1886: Ipswich
Party	Candidate	Votes	%	±%
Conservative	Hugo Charteris	3,846	26.7	+1.8
Conservative	Charles Dalrymple	3,838	26.6	+2.2
Liberal	Sydney Stern	3,386	23.5	−1.9
Liberal	Benjamin Thomas Lindsay Thomson	3,334	23.2	−2.1
Turnout		7,252	81.8	−4.2
Registered electors		8,867		
Majority		452	3.1	N/A
Conservative gain from Liberal		Swing	+1.9	
Conservative gain from Liberal		Swing	+2.2	

1886 Ipswich by-election
Party	Candidate	Votes	%	±%
Conservative	Charles Dalrymple	3,687	25.2	+0.3
Conservative	Hugo Charteris	3,662	25.1	+0.7
Liberal	Lord John Harvey	3,635	24.9	−0.5
Liberal	Horace Davey	3,627	24.8	−0.5
Turnout		7,371	83.1	−2.9
Registered electors		8,867		
Majority		27	0.2	N/A
Conservative gain from Liberal		Swing	+0.4	
Conservative gain from Liberal		Swing	+0.6	

- Caused by the 1885 election being declared void on account of bribery.

General election 1885: Ipswich
Party	Candidate	Votes	%	±%
Liberal	Henry Wyndham West	3,795	25.4	+0.6
Liberal	Jesse Collings	3,777	25.3	+0.1
Conservative	Edward Murray Ind	3,717	24.9	−0.8
Conservative	William Thomas Charley	3,649	24.4	0.0
Turnout		7,623	86.0	+3.5 (est.)
Registered electors		8,867		
Majority		60	0.4	−0.4
Liberal hold		Swing	+0.7	
Liberal gain from Conservative		Swing	+0.1	

1883 Ipswich by-election
Party	Candidate	Votes	%	±%
Liberal	Henry Wyndham West	3,266	53.7	+3.7
Conservative	William Thomas Charley	2,816	46.3	−3.8
Majority		450	7.4	N/A
Turnout		6,082	76.9	−5.6 (est.)
Registered electors		7,914		
Liberal gain from Conservative		Swing	+3.8	

- Caused by Cobbold's death.

General election 1880: Ipswich
Party	Candidate	Votes	%	±%
Conservative	Thomas Cobbold	3,142	25.7	−2.9
Liberal	Jesse Collings	3,074	25.2	+1.8
Liberal	Henry Wyndham West	3,025	24.8	+3.1
Conservative	James Redfoord Bulwer	2,979	24.4	−2.0
Turnout		6,110 (est.)	82.5 (est.)	+1.6
Registered electors		7,406		
Majority		68	0.5	−2.5
Conservative hold		Swing	−3.0	
Majority		95	0.8	N/A
Liberal gain from Conservative		Swing	+1.9	

=== Elections in the 1870s ===
1876 Ipswich by-election
Party	Candidate	Votes	%	±%
Conservative	Thomas Cobbold	2,213	57.9	+2.9
Lib-Lab	William Newton	1,607	42.1	−3.0
Majority		606	15.8	+12.8
Turnout		3,820	51.6	−29.3
Registered electors		7,406		
Conservative hold		Swing	+3.0	

- Caused by Cobbold's death.

General election 1874: Ipswich
Party	Candidate	Votes	%	±%
Conservative	John Cobbold	3,059	28.6	+13.0
Conservative	James Redfoord Bulwer	2,827	26.4	+10.8
Liberal	Hugh Adair	2,506	23.4	−12.0
Liberal	Henry Wyndham West	2,322	21.7	−11.8
Majority		321	3.0	N/A
Turnout		5,357 (est.)	80.9 (est.)	+0.5
Registered electors		6,619		
Conservative gain from Liberal		Swing	+12.5	
Conservative gain from Liberal		Swing	+11.3	

=== Elections in the 1860s ===
General election 1868: Ipswich
Party	Candidate	Votes	%	±%
Liberal	Hugh Adair	2,321	35.4	+7.7
Liberal	Henry Wyndham West	2,195	33.5	+8.2
Conservative	John Cobbold	2,044	31.2	−15.8
Majority		151	2.3	0.0
Turnout		4,302 (est.)	80.4 (est.)	−4.1
Registered electors		5,352		
Liberal hold		Swing	+7.8	
Liberal gain from Conservative		Swing	+8.1	

General election 1865: Ipswich
Party	Candidate	Votes	%	±%
Liberal	Hugh Adair	992	27.7	−1.0
Conservative	John Cobbold	910	25.4	−5.1
Liberal	Henry Wyndham West	904	25.3	+12.4
Conservative	William Tidmas	774	21.6	−6.4
Turnout		1,790 (est.)	84.5 (est.)	+5.8
Registered electors		2,118		
Majority		82	2.3	+1.6
Liberal hold		Swing	+3.4	
Majority		6	0.1	−1.7
Conservative hold		Swing	−5.4	

=== Elections in the 1850s ===
General election 1859: Ipswich
Party	Candidate	Votes	%	±%
Conservative	John Cobbold	918	30.5	+4.4
Liberal	Hugh Adair	864	28.7	+3.3
Conservative	Henry Selwin	842	28.0	+4.3
Liberal	John King	388	12.9	−11.8
Turnout		1,506 (est.)	78.7 (est.)	−0.3
Registered electors		1,914		
Majority		54	1.8	+1.1
Conservative hold		Swing	+4.3	
Majority		22	0.7	−1.0
Liberal hold		Swing	−0.5	

General election 1857: Ipswich
Party	Candidate	Votes	%	±%
Conservative	John Cobbold	780	26.1	−0.5
Whig	Hugh Adair	759	25.4	−0.3
Whig	John Clark Marshman	738	24.7	+0.9
Conservative	Henry Selwin	709	23.7	−0.1
Turnout		1,493 (est.)	79.0 (est.)	−3.7
Registered electors		1,891		
Majority		21	0.7	−0.2
Conservative hold		Swing	−0.4	
Majority		50	1.7	−0.2
Whig hold		Swing	0.0	

General election 1852: Ipswich
Party	Candidate	Votes	%	±%
Conservative	John Cobbold	809	26.6	−3.6
Whig	Hugh Adair	782	25.7	−0.1
Radical	Thomas Hobhouse	725	23.8	N/A
Conservative	Samuel Bateson	725	23.8	−0.3
Turnout		1,521 (est.)	82.7 (est.)	+2.7
Registered electors		1,838		
Majority		27	0.9	−3.5
Conservative hold		Swing	−1.8	
Majority		57	1.9	+0.2
Whig hold		Swing	+1.9	

=== Elections in the 1840s ===
General election 1847: Ipswich
Party	Candidate	Votes	%	±%
Conservative	John Cobbold	829	30.2	+6.1
Whig	Hugh Adair	708	25.8	−26.2
Conservative	John Neilson Gladstone	661	24.1	+0.2
Chartist	Henry Vincent	546	19.9	N/A
Turnout		1,372 (est.)	80.0 (est.)	+0.3
Registered electors		1,714		
Majority		121	4.4	N/A
Conservative gain from Whig		Swing	+9.6	
Majority		47	1.7	−0.2
Whig hold		Swing	−16.3	

By-election 17 August 1842: Ipswich
Party	Candidate	Votes	%	±%
Conservative	John Neilson Gladstone	651	28.1	+4.0
Conservative	Sackville Lane-Fox	641	27.7	+3.8
Whig	David Thornbury	548	23.7	−28.3
Chartist	Henry Vincent	473	20.4	N/A
Radical	John Nicholson	2	0.0	N/A
Majority		93	4.0	N/A
Turnout		1,158 (est.)	71.5 (est.)	−8.2
Registered electors		1,704		
Conservative gain from Whig		Swing	+9.1	
Conservative gain from Whig		Swing	+9.0	

- Caused by the earlier by-election being declared void on petition, due to bribery by Cuffe's and Gladstone's agents, on 30 July 1842.

By-election 3 June 1842: Ipswich
Party	Candidate	Votes	%	±%
Conservative	John Cuffe	680	27.9	+3.8
Conservative	Thomas Gladstone	673	27.6	+3.7
Whig	Thomas Gisborne	543	22.3	−29.7
Radical	George Moffatt	541	22.2	N/A
Radical	John Nicholson	3	0.1	N/A
Majority		130	5.3	N/A
Turnout		1,220 (est.)	75.4 (est.)	−4.3
Registered electors		1,619		
Conservative gain from Whig		Swing	+9.3	
Conservative gain from Whig		Swing	+9.3	

- Caused by the general election result being declared void on petition, due to bribery by Wason's and Rennie's agents, on 25 April 1842

General election 1841: Ipswich
Party	Candidate	Votes	%	±%
Whig	Rigby Wason	659	26.0	+1.1
Whig	George Rennie	657	26.0	+1.0
Conservative	Fitzroy Kelly	611	24.1	−0.8
Conservative	John Charles Herries	604	23.9	−1.3
Majority		46	1.9	+1.8
Turnout		c. 1,266	c. 79.7	c. −9.3
Registered electors		1,587		
Whig hold		Swing	+1.1	
Whig gain from Conservative		Swing	+1.0	

=== Elections in the 1830s ===
By-election, 15 July 1839: Ipswich
Party	Candidate	Votes	%	±%
Conservative	Thomas John Cochrane	621	50.2	+0.1
Whig	Thomas Milner Gibson	615	49.8	−0.1
Majority		6	0.4	+0.2
Turnout		1,236	87.2	−1.8
Registered electors		1,418		
Conservative hold		Swing	+0.1	

- Caused by Gibson's defection to the Whigs.

General election 1837: Ipswich
Party	Candidate	Votes	%	±%
Conservative	Thomas Milner Gibson	601	25.2	−0.5
Whig	Henry Tufnell	595	25.0	+1.1
Conservative	Fitzroy Kelly	593	24.9	−0.9
Whig	Rigby Wason	593	24.9	+0.3
Turnout		1,262	89.0	−1.2
Registered electors		1,418		
Majority		6	0.2	−0.9
Conservative hold		Swing	−0.6	
Majority		2	0.1	N/A
Whig gain from Conservative		Swing	+0.9	

- Tufnell was later unseated on petition, and Kelly was returned in his place

By-election, 19 June 1835: Ipswich
Party	Candidate	Votes	%	±%
Whig	James Morrison	542	27.6	+3.7
Whig	Rigby Wason	533	27.2	+2.6
Conservative	Horatio George Broke	454	23.1	−2.7
Conservative	William Holmes	434	22.1	−3.6
Majority		79	4.1	N/A
Turnout		992	82.1	−8.1
Registered electors		1,209		
Whig gain from Conservative		Swing	+3.4	
Whig gain from Conservative		Swing	+2.9	

- Caused by the 1835 election being declared void on petition

General election 1835: Ipswich
Party	Candidate	Votes	%	±%
Conservative	Fitzroy Kelly	557	25.8	+11.4
Conservative	Robert Dundas	555	25.7	+4.3
Whig	Rigby Wason	531	24.6	−7.4
Whig	James Morrison	516	23.9	−8.4
Majority		24	1.1	N/A
Turnout		1,090	90.2	+12.0
Registered electors		1,209		
Conservative gain from Whig		Swing	+9.7	
Conservative gain from Whig		Swing	+6.1	

General election 1832: Ipswich
Party	Candidate	Votes	%	±%
Whig	James Morrison	599	32.3	+2.7
Whig	Rigby Wason	593	32.0	+2.5
Tory	Edward Goulburn	303	16.3	N/A
Tory	Fitzroy Kelly	267	14.4	N/A
Tory	Charles Mackinnon	94	5.1	−15.3
Majority		290	15.7	+6.6
Turnout		953	78.2	c. +8.8
Registered electors		1,219		
Whig hold		Swing	+5.2	
Whig hold		Swing	+5.1	

General election 1831: Ipswich
Party	Candidate	Votes	%	±%
Whig	James Morrison	468	29.6	+21.8
Whig	Rigby Wason	467	29.5	+21.7
Tory	Charles Mackinnon	323	20.4	−21.8
Tory	Robert FitzRoy	323	20.4	−21.8
Majority		144	9.1	N/A
Turnout		798	c. 69.4	c. +21.1
Registered electors		c. 1,150		
Whig gain from Tory		Swing	+21.8	
Whig gain from Tory		Swing	+21.8	

General election 1830: Ipswich
Party	Candidate	Votes	%	±%
Tory	Robert Dundas	406	42.2	
Tory	Charles Mackinnon	406	42.2	
Whig	John Disney	150	15.6	
Majority		256	26.6	
Turnout		556	c. 48.3	
Registered electors		c. 1,150		
Tory gain from Whig		Swing		
Tory gain from Whig		Swing		

=== Elections in the 1820s ===
1826 General Election: Ipswich
Party	Candidate	Votes	%	±%
Whig	William Haldimand	496		
Whig	Robert Torrens	495		
Tory	Robert Dundas	488		
Tory	Charles Mackinnon	488		
Majority		7		
Turnout		1,003		
Registered electors				
Whig hold		Swing		
Whig hold		Swing		

- After a successful electoral petition, Dundas and Mackinnon were declared elected.

1820 General Election: Ipswich
Party	Candidate	Votes	%	±%
Whig	William Haldimand	483 / 428		
Whig	Thomas Barrett-Lennard	482 / 427		
Tory	Robert Crickitt	474 / 430		
Tory	Charles Mackinnon	468 / 424		
Majority		3		
Turnout		1,709		
Registered electors				
Whig gain from Tory		Swing		
Whig gain from Tory		Swing		

- Figures are shown pre and post scrutiny. After a successful electoral petition, Haldimand and Barrett-Lennard were declared elected.

=== Elections in the 1810s ===
1818 General Election: Ipswich
Party	Candidate	Votes	%	±%
Tory	Robert Crickitt	428 / 394		
Tory	William Newton	422 / 387		
Whig	Henry Baring	389 / 356		
Whig	William Bolton	362 / 335		
Majority		31		
Turnout		1,472		
Registered electors				
Tory hold				
Tory hold				

- Figures are shown pre and post scrutiny.

1812 General Election: Ipswich
Party	Candidate	Votes	%	±%
Tory	Robert Crickitt	Unopposed	N/A	N/A
Tory	John Round	Unopposed	N/A	N/A
Registered electors				
Tory hold				
Tory hold				

=== Elections in the 1800s ===
1807 General Election: Ipswich
Party	Candidate	Votes	%	±%
Tory	Home Riggs Popham	397		
Tory	Robert Crickitt	388		
Whig	Richard Wilson	327		
Whig	R H A Bennett	320		
Majority		61		
Turnout		1,432		
Registered electors				
Tory gain from Whig		Swing		
Tory gain from Whig		Swing		

1806 General Election: Ipswich
Party	Candidate	Votes	%	±%
Whig	Richard Wilson	367		
Whig	Robert Stopford	358		
Tory	Robert Crickitt	182		
Tory	John Gibbons	176		
Majority		176		
Turnout		1,083		
Registered electors				
Whig gain from Tory		Swing		
Whig hold		Swing		

1803 Ipswich by-election
Party	Candidate	Votes	%	±%
	William Middleton	Unopposed	N/A	N/A
Registered electors				

- Caused by the death of Charles Crickitt

1802 General Election: Ipswich
Party	Candidate	Votes	%	±%
Tory	Andrew Hamond	Unopposed	N/A	N/A
Tory	Charles Crickitt	Unopposed	N/A	N/A
Registered electors				
Tory hold				
Tory hold				

=== Elections in the 1790s ===
1796 General Election: Ipswich
Party	Candidate	Votes	%	±%
Tory	Andrew Hamond	402		
Tory	Charles Crickitt	382		
Whig	William Middleton	311		
Majority		71		
Turnout				
Registered electors				
Tory gain from Whig		Swing		
Tory hold		Swing		

1790 General Election: Ipswich
Party	Candidate	Votes	%	±%
Whig	John D'Oyly	322		
Tory	Charles Crickitt	313		
Tory	William Middleton	299		
Whig	George Rochfort	243		
Majority		14		
Turnout				
Registered electors				
Whig hold		Swing		
Tory hold		Swing		

=== Elections in the 1780s ===
1784 Ipswich By-election
Party	Candidate	Votes	%	±%
Tory	Charles Crickitt	353		
Whig	Robert Thornton	185		
Majority		168		
Turnout		538		
Registered electors				
Tory gain from Whig		Swing		

- By election called after the election of John Cator was declared void

1784 General Election: Ipswich
Party	Candidate	Votes	%	±%
Tory	William Middleton	460		
Whig	John Cator	297		
Tory	Charles Crickitt	7		
Majority		290		
Turnout				
Registered electors				
Tory gain from Whig		Swing		
Whig hold		Swing		

1780 General Election: Ipswich
Party	Candidate	Votes	%	±%
Whig	William Wollaston	346		
Whig	Thomas Staunton	341		
Tory	Joshua Grigby	253		
Tory	William Middleton	247		
Majority		92		
Turnout				
Registered electors				
Whig hold		Swing		
Whig hold		Swing		

=== Elections in the 1770s ===
1774 General Election: Ipswich
Party	Candidate	Votes	%	±%
Whig	William Wollaston	357		
Whig	Thomas Staunton	205		
Tory	Francis Vernon	160		
Majority		45		
Turnout				
Registered electors				
Whig hold		Swing		
Whig hold		Swing		

=== Elections in the 1760s ===
1768 General Election: Ipswich
Party	Candidate	Votes	%	±%
Whig	William Wollaston	357		
Whig	Thomas Staunton	357		
Tory	Wilbraham Tollemache	289		
Tory	Edward Cruttenden	287		
Majority		68		
Turnout				
Registered electors				
Whig hold		Swing		
Whig gain from Tory		Swing		

1762 Ipswich By-election
Party	Candidate	Votes	%	±%
Tory	Francis Vernon	Unopposed		
Registered electors				
Tory hold		Swing		

- Called when Vernon became a Commissioner for Trade and Plantations

1761 General Election: Ipswich
Party	Candidate	Votes	%	±%
Tory	Francis Vernon	Unopposed		
Whig	Thomas Staunton	Unopposed		
Registered electors				
Tory hold		Swing		
Whig hold		Swing		

=== Elections in the 1750s ===
1759 Ipswich By-election
Party	Candidate	Votes	%	±%
Whig	George Montgomerie	Unopposed		
Registered electors				
Whig hold		Swing		

- Called on the death of Samuel Kent

1757 Ipswich By-election
Party	Candidate	Votes	%	±%
Whig	Thomas Staunton	Unopposed		
Registered electors				
Whig gain from Tory		Swing		

- Called on the death of Edward Vernon

1754 General Election: Ipswich
Party	Candidate	Votes	%	±%
Tory	Edward Vernon	Unopposed		
Whig	Samuel Kent	Unopposed		
Registered electors				
Tory hold		Swing		
Whig hold		Swing		

- Unusually the Yellows supported in Edward Vernon an identifiable Tory and critic of the Whig government. The Blues meanwhile supported Samuel Kent and Richard Lloyd, both supporters of the Whig government. Although Lloyd would later withdraw before that point it had proved an expensive contest for Vernon.

=== Elections in the 1740s ===
1747 General Election: Ipswich
Party	Candidate	Votes	%	±%
Tory	Edward Vernon	Unopposed		
Whig	Samuel Kent	Unopposed		
Registered electors				
Tory hold		Swing		
Whig hold		Swing		

1741 General Election: Ipswich
Party	Candidate	Votes	%	±%
Tory	Edward Vernon	527		
Whig	Samuel Kent	297		
Whig	Knox Ward	224		
Majority		73		
Turnout				
Registered electors				
Tory gain from Whig		Swing		
Whig hold		Swing		

=== Elections in the 1730s ===
1734 General Election: Ipswich
Party	Candidate	Votes	%	±%
Whig	Samuel Kent	308		
Whig	William Wollaston	296		
Tory	Edward Vernon	215		
Tory	Philip Colman	195		
Majority		81		
Turnout				
Registered electors				
Whig gain from Tory		Swing		
Whig hold		Swing		

1733 Ipswich By-election
Party	Candidate	Votes	%	±%
Whig	William Wollaston	Unopposed		
Registered electors				
Whig hold		Swing		

- Called on death of Francis Negus

1730 Ipswich By-election
Party	Candidate	Votes	%	±%
Tory	Philip Broke	Unopposed		
Registered electors				
Tory hold		Swing		

- Called on William Thompson becoming a judge

=== Elections in the 1720s ===
1727 General Election: Ipswich
Party	Candidate	Votes	%	±%
Whig	Francis Negus	438		
Whig	William Thompson	396		
Tory	? Crowley	214		
Majority		82		
Turnout				
Registered electors				
Whig hold		Swing		
Whig hold		Swing		

1726 Ipswich By-election
Party	Candidate	Votes	%	±%
Whig	William Thompson	Unopposed		
Registered electors				
Whig hold		Swing		

- By-election called on William Thompson being made a Baron of the Exchequer

1722 General Election: Ipswich
Party	Candidate	Votes	%	±%
Whig	Francis Negus	Unopposed		
Whig	William Thompson	Unopposed		
Registered electors				
Whig hold		Swing		
Whig hold		Swing		

=== Elections in the 1710s ===
December 1717 Ipswich By-election
Party	Candidate	Votes	%	±%
Whig	Francis Negus	Unopposed		
Registered electors				
Whig hold		Swing		

- By-election called on William Churchill winning a government contract for stationery and resigning his seat as an office of profit to the crown. Instead of seeking re-election he stood in favour of his son in law Francis Negus.

February 1717 Ipswich By-election
Party	Candidate	Votes	%	±%
Whig	William Thompson	Unopposed		
Registered electors				
Whig hold		Swing		

- By-election called on William Thompson becoming Solicitor General

1715 General Election: Ipswich
Party	Candidate	Votes	%	±%
Whig	William Churchill	Unopposed		
Whig	William Thompson	Unopposed		
Registered electors				
Whig hold		Swing		
Whig hold		Swing		

1713 General Election: Ipswich
Party	Candidate	Votes	%	±%
Whig	William Thompson	270		
Whig	William Churchill	265		
Tory	Orlando Bridgeman	218		
Tory	Richard Richardson	204		
Registered electors				
Whig gain from Tory		Swing		
Whig hold		Swing		

- Successfully overturned through an electoral petition and Richardson and Bridgeman installed as MPs.

1710 General Election: Ipswich
Party	Candidate	Votes	%	±%
Tory	William Barker	258		
Whig	William Churchill	258		
Whig	William Thompson	235		
Tory	Orlando Bridgeman	172		
Registered electors				
Tory hold		Swing		
Whig hold		Swing		

=== Elections in the 1700s ===
1708 General Election: Ipswich
Party	Candidate	Votes	%	±%
Whig	William Churchill	303		
Tory	William Barker	264		
Whig	Charles Whitaker	157		
Registered electors				
Whig hold		Swing		
Tory hold		Swing		

1707 Ipswich By-election: Ipswich
Party	Candidate	Votes	%	±%
Whig	William Churchill	188		
Tory	William Barker	182		
Registered electors				
Whig hold		Swing		

- Called on the death of Henry Poley

1705 General Election: Ipswich
Party	Candidate	Votes	%	±%
Tory	John Bence	Unopposed		
Tory	Henry Poley	Unopposed		
Tory hold		Swing		
Tory gain from Whig		Swing		

1702 General Election: Ipswich
Party	Candidate	Votes	%	±%
Tory	John Bence			
Whig	Charles Whitaker			
Tory	Richard Phillips			
Tory hold		Swing		
Whig hold		Swing		

November 1701 General Election: Ipswich
Party	Candidate	Votes	%	±%
Whig	Charles Whitaker	170		
Tory	Richard Phillips	169		
Tory	John Bence	126		
Whig hold		Swing		
Tory hold		Swing		

January 1701 General Election: Ipswich
Party	Candidate	Votes	%	±%
Whig	Joseph Martin	201		
Tory	Charles Duncombe	185		
Tory	Richard Phillips	94		
Whig hold		Swing		
Tory hold		Swing		

=== Elections in the 1690s ===
1698 General Election: Ipswich
Party	Candidate	Votes	%	±%
Whig	Samuel Barnardiston	149		
Tory	Richard Phillips	147		
Whig	Charles Whitaker	105		
Registered electors				
Whig hold		Swing		
Tory hold		Swing		

1696 Ipswich by-election
Party	Candidate	Votes	%	±%
Tory	Richard Phillips	Unopposed		
Registered electors				
Tory hold		Swing		

1695 General Election: Ipswich
Party	Candidate	Votes	%	±%
Tory	John Barker			
Whig	Charles Whitaker			
Tory	Charles Blois			
Whig	Samuel Barnardiston			
Registered electors				
Tory hold		Swing		
Whig gain from Tory		Swing		

1690 General Election: Ipswich
Party	Candidate	Votes	%	±%
Tory	John Barker	143		
Tory	Charles Blois	110		
Whig	Charles Whitaker	103		
Whig	John Hodges	59		
Registered electors				
Tory hold		Swing		
Tory hold		Swing		

=== Elections in the 1680s ===
1689 Ipswich By-election
Party	Candidate	Votes	%	±%
Tory	Charles Blois	111		
Whig	Samuel Barnardiston	94		
Registered electors				
Tory gain from Whig		Swing		

- Caused by Peyton Ventris becoming a Justice of the Common Pleas

1689 General Election: Ipswich
Party	Candidate	Votes	%	±%
Tory	John Barker	170		
Whig	Peyton Ventris	169		
Tory	Henry Felton	58		
Registered electors				
Tory hold		Swing		
Whig gain from Tory		Swing		

== See also ==
- List of parliamentary constituencies in Suffolk
- List of parliamentary constituencies in the East of England (region)
