= Robert Lucas (MP) =

MP of Ipswich, Suff (died 1420)

Robert Lucas was one of the two MPs for Ipswich in 1406.
