= John Felbrigg =

English Member of Parliament

John Felbrigg was one of the two MPs for Ipswich in 1407.
