= Richard Bryde =

Richard Bryde also Byrde was one of the two MPs for Ipswich in the English Parliament for March 1553.
