= John Lewe =

John Lewe (or Liew) was one of the two Members of Parliament for Ipswich in 1399. His dates of birth and death are unrecorded.
