= Thomas Baldry =

16th-century English politician

Thomas Baldry (by 1481 – 1524/25), of Ipswich, Suffolk, was an English politician.

He was the son of Thomas Baldry (d.1500) of Ipswich and brother of Thomas Baldry, Mayor of London for 1523.

He was a Member of Parliament (MP) for Ipswich in 1504, 1512 and 1515.
