= William Spencer (MP for Ipswich) =

16th-century English politician

William Spencer (by 1473 – 1529 or later), of Ipswich, Suffolk, was an English merchant and politician.

He was a member of parliament (MP) for Ipswich in 1510.
