= Henry Wall (MP) =

Henry Wall (or Well) was a merchant and one of the two Members of Parliament for Ipswich in 1394. He married a woman named Alice. The last record of him is in March 1397; it is unknown when he died.
