= Richard Church (MP) =

Richard Church (or Chirche) (died 1428), was from Thornham near Eye and Gislingham, Suffolk, was one of the two Members of Parliament for Ipswich in 1402.

His heir was his daughter, Mary Topsfield.
