= Edmund Day (politician) =

Edmund Day, or Deye, was one of the two MPs for Ipswich in the English parliament of 1628.
