= Gilbert Lindfield =

Gilbert Lindfield was one of the two MPs for Ipswich in the English parliament from 1674 to 1680.
