= John Smith alias Dyer =

16th-century English politician

John Smith alias Dyer (1498/1499 – 1571), of Ipswich, Suffolk, was an English politician.

He was a member of parliament (MP) for Ipswich in 1547, 1553 and 1554.
