= John Starling (MP) =

John Starling was elected Member of Parliament for Ipswich in 1413.

John was a wealthy butcher, who reared animals himself on pasture he owned or rented. He was a bailiff for the Ipswich Corporation several times: 1404-05, 1407-8, 1412-3, 1416-7.
