= William Debenham the younger =

William Debenham was one of the two MPs for Ipswich in a number of English parliaments from November 1414 to 1437.
