= John Sparrow (MP) =

16th-century English politician

John Sparrow (by 1509 – 1558), of Ipswich, Suffolk, was an English politician.

John was the eldest son of Thomas Sparrow of Somersham, Suffolk. His mother was Elizabeth daughter of William Snelling of Elmsett.

John was active in civic life in Ipswich taking on several roles in Ipswich Corporation from 1537, when he became a portman as well as being elected treasurer. In 1541 he was elected a bailiff of Ipswich Corporation and in December of that year he was appointed member of parliament (MP) for Ipswich, a position which was a corporation role. The parliament sat in January 1542.
