= Orlando Bridgeman (Ipswich MP) =

English politician (1680–1731)

Orlando Bridgeman (1680 – 25 April 1731) was one of the two MPs for Ipswich in the English parliament from April 1714 to January 1715. He stood as a Tory.
