= Portman (burgess) =

Medieval office for governance of an English port

A portman was a medieval designation for a freeman or burgess of a port. The term was used at a number of places across England: Orford, Ipswich The term was used in Anglo-Saxon Wessex although it remained uncommon. Portmonna hyðe appears in a document bestowing rights on Abingdon Abbey in 962. This probably relates to a now lost Roman quay at Lepe, Hampshire which had survived and was used in the reign of Edgar the Peaceful (959 – 975).

== Portsman ==
The cinque ports located along the English coast near the channel were granted a single royal charter in 1155, with a shared responsibility to supply ships to the English Crown. The burgesses of the confederated towns were termed "portsmen". The portsmen from all the towns would assemble at the "Brodhull" where matters of general concern were discussed.

In 1322 the portsmen were granted the status of barons and as such could attend parliament.

== Ipswich Portmanmote ==
The historian Geoffrey Martin carried out extensive research on the archival resources of medieval Ipswich in the 1950's and he highlight the role of the portmanmote as the only court in the town for the first hundred years following the creation of the corporation in 1200.
