= Edmund Daundy =

English politician

Member of Parliament for Ipswich
- In office 1512–1515

Personal details
- Born: By 1468
- Died: 6 May 1515 (aged 46–47)
- Children: 4, including Robert
- Relatives: Thomas Wolsey (nephew); Sir Nicholas Bacon (grandson-in-law); Sir Thomas Gresham (grandson-in-law)

Edmund Daundy (by 1468 – 6 May 1515), of Ipswich, Suffolk, was an English politician and Ipswich merchant. He was a Member of Parliament (MP) for Ipswich in 1512 and 1515. He was one of the wealthiest merchants in early 16th-century Ipswich, being described by his son after his death as "a man of lands and possessions to the yearly value of six-score marks and above and also of great substance in plate, money, leases, farms and other goods, chattels and debts to the value of £1,000 and above".

== Biography ==
Daundy was born to Thomas Daundy of Ipswich and Mary Wingfield, who was part of the Wingfield family in Wingfield, Suffolk. It's unclear exactly when Daundy was born but, as he paid for a bell to be cast in his local church in 1480, it's likely his birth was between 1450 and 1460. He was Thomas Wolsey's uncle, being a brother to Wolsey's mother, Joan. and it is believed, having seen how bright Wolsey was as a boy, he paid for Wolsey's education in both Ipswich and at the University of Oxford.

Daundy was the father of four children: Two sons William and Robert and two daughters. His daughter, Agnes, married William Ferneley, and their daughters Jane and Anne married Sir Nicholas Bacon and Sir Thomas Gresham respectively. His son, Robert Daundy, was also subsequently MP for Ipswich.

In 1509 he founded a chantry chapel located in St Lawrence Church, Ipswich. This has since become Chantry Park, Ipswich. The tower of St Lawrence Church (now St Lawrence Centre) features the oldest ring of church bells remaining in the world. Its five bells were commissioned and hung between 1450 and 1480 - four of them were cast circa 1450 and a fifth added circa 1480. It’s believed that Edmund Daundy paid for the fifth bell. In 2009 the bells were sent to the Whitechapel Bell Foundry in London to be cleaned and were later put into a new frame, made of steel and cast iron, rather than wood. As a young boy, Thomas Wolsey will have known the sound of the bells and they are now known as "Wolsey's bells". Apart from the bell in St. Lawrence’s church, Daundy also donated the Tudor Market Cross in 1510. It was “beautified” at the restoration of Charles II, was also replaced with today’s Town Hall.

He left extensive bequests for the town in his Will dated 2 May 1515.
