= Ralph Goodwin (16th-century MP) =

English politician (1505–1562)

Ralph Goodwin (by 1505 – 1562), of Ipswich, Suffolk, was an English politician.

He was a Member of Parliament (MP) for Ipswich in 1542 and November 1554.
