= Richard Smart (gentleman) =

16th-century English politician

Richard Smart (by 1507 – 25 August 1560) was an English burgess of Ipswich, Suffolk, and landed gentleman who served as a member of the House of Commons of England.

Smart held the manors of Great and Little Stanbridge, holding them both of Thomas Shaa by fealty and a small annual rent. He was one of the two Members of Parliament for Ipswich in 1545 and again in 1555.

He died on 28 August 1560.
