= Richard Phillips (MP) =

English politician

Richard Phillips (c. 1640 – 8 January 1720) was an English Tory politician.

He was the Member of Parliament for Ipswich, Suffolk from 10 November 1696 to January 1701 and from December 1701 to July 1702. Phillips was appointed High Sheriff of Suffolk for 1703–04.

He was fined £100 in 1702 for 'neglecting his duties as a portman' but recognised for his service to Ipswich.

He married twice:firstly Anne, the daughter and coheiress of Edward Greene, merchant of London and secondly Frances, the daughter of Charles Burrough of Ipswich, with whom he had 1 son and 2 daughters.
