= English Congregation in Geneva =

16th-century Protestant exiles

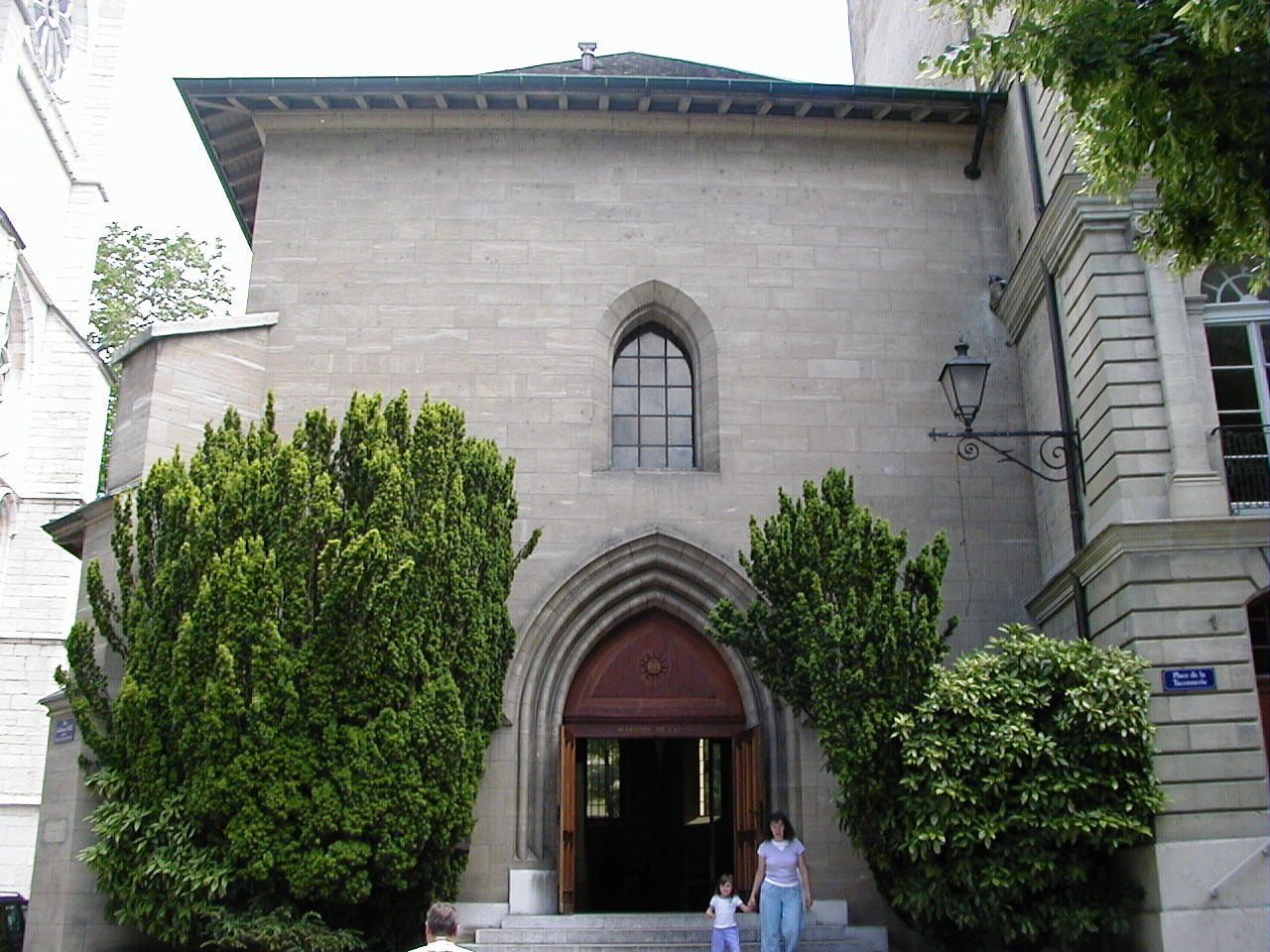
- The Auditoire de Calvin where the congregation met
- Formation: 1555
- Dissolved: 1559
- Type: Protestant exile congregation
- Headquarters: Geneva, Republic of Geneva
- Region served: English and Scottish Marian exiles
- Official language: English
- Main organ: Company of pastors, elders, and deacons
- Publication: Book of Geneva (1556); Geneva Bible (1560)

The English Congregation in Geneva was a group of Protestant exiles from England and Scotland who fled to Geneva during the Marian persecutions. Led largely by John Knox, it was the largest and most radical of the Marian exiles, both politically and theologically. The Congregation introduced a Presbyterian form of worship and church governance, along with producing the Book of Common Order (1556) and the influential Geneva Bible (1560), and became a focal point for debates over resistance theory and church discipline.

== Numbers ==
They reached a peak of 233 people or about 140 households, approximately 2% of the city's population. Names, dates of arrival, and other information is preserved in the Livre des Anglais. New members admitted to the church numbered 48 in 1555, 50 in 1556, 67 in 1557, ten in 1558, and two in 1559. Seven marriages, four baptisms, and 18 deaths are recorded.

== Influence ==
This was the first English congregation to adopt the wholly Presbyterian form of discipline and worship that was resisted in Frankfurt. These forms and standards were printed in 1556 as the Book of Geneva which went through several editions after 1556 in Geneva and was in official use in the Church of Scotland from 1564 to 1645. Sometimes titled Book of Our Common Order, it is the basis for the modern Book of Common Order used by Presbyterian churches.

The English church in Geneva was also the scene of the Geneva Bible's production, which was to be the most popular English version of the era and the most notorious for its annotations that supported Reformed theology and resistance theory. At Geneva Knox wrote his infamous First Blast of the Trumpet Blowen Against the Monstrous Regiment of Women during the winter of 1557–58. Published in Geneva in the spring 1558, it denounced all female rulers in the most strident language. This was opposed by many other English exiles, especially those seeking favor with Elizabeth I, such as John Aylmer, who published a retort to Knox called Harborowe for Faithful and True Subjects in 1559. Christopher Goodman took a more circumspect approach in a How superior powers ought to be obeyd of their subjects & wherein they may lawfully by Gods Worde be disobeyed & resisted, for which Whittingham wrote the preface. Laurence Humphrey, working out of Strasbourg, claimed to be clarifying what Knox, Ponet, and Goodman really meant when he defended passive resistance only and supported the legitimacy of female rule in De religionis conservatione et reformatione vera (1559).

John Calvin proposed that the English exiles should hold their own services in the building where he delivered lectures, later known as the Calvin Auditory. This worship in English continues in the building to the present day, under the Church of Scotland.

== Members ==
Members of the English church in Geneva included Sir William Stafford, Sir John Burtwick, John Bodley and the eldest of his five sons (Laurence, Thomas, and Josias who was later knighted), James Pilkington, John Scory, Thomas Bentham, William Cole, William Kethe, Thomas Sampson, Anthony Gilby, John Pullein, Perceval Wiburne, and Robert Fills.

- Ministers: Christopher Goodman (1555–1558), Anthony Gilby (1555), and John Knox (1556–1558)
- Elders: William Williams (1555–1558), William Whittingham (1555–1556), Gilby (1556–1558), William Fuller (1556), Thomas Wood (1557), Miles Coverdale (1558), and John Bodley (1557–1558)
- Deacons: John Staunton (1555–1556), Christopher Seburne (1555), Francis Withers (1556–1557), William Beauvoir (1556–1558), John Staunton (1556), John Pullein (1557), William Fuller (1557), Francis Willias (1558), Peter Willis (1558), and Whittingham (1558)
