= George Montgomerie =

George Montgomerie (30 August 1712 – 26 March 1766) was a British Member of Parliament.

He was born the eldest son of George Montgomerie of Horndon-on-the-Hill, Essex and educated at Eton College (1728–31), the Middle Temple (1731) and St John's College, Cambridge (1732).

He served as a Yellow (Whig (MP) for Ipswich between 20 November 1759 and 27 March 1761. He was also the High Sheriff of Cambridgeshire and Huntingdonshire for 1759–60.

He died in 1766. He had married Catherine, the daughter of Jacob Sawbridge, MP and had one daughter, who married Crisp Molineux, MP.

Parliament of Great Britain
Preceded by Samuel Kent; Thomas Staunton	Member of Parliament for Ipswich; 1759–1761; With: Thomas Staunton	Succeeded by Francis Vernon; Thomas Staunton
