= Hanford Mill, Ipswich =

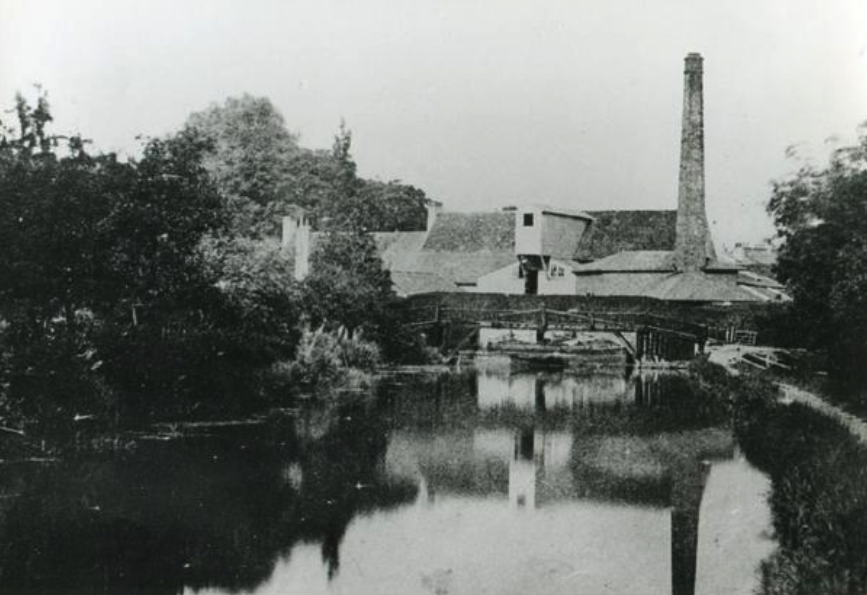
- Hanford Mill, Ipswich 1865

General information
- Status: Demolished
- Type: Watermill; Oil mill
- Location: Handford Road, Ipswich, Ipswich, United Kingdom
- Coordinates: 52.0575°N 1.1444°E
- Completed: pre Norman Conquest
- Owner: Historically Ipswich Corporation

Hanford Mill was an historic watermill located in Ipswich, Suffolk. The first record of the mill dates from 1323.

In the nineteenth century the mill was owned by Ipswich Corporation. In 1830 they leased it to Ezra Dalton. However, by 1840 this had been taken over by Samuel Webber who converted it into an oil mill.
