= Samuel Kent =

Samuel Kent may refer to:

- Samuel B. Kent (born 1949), former U.S. District Court judge
- Samuel Kent (MP) (c. 1683–1759), member of the Parliament of Great Britain
