= Kent baronets =

1782 Great Britain Parliament Status

Escutcheon of the Kent baronets of Fornham

The Kent baronetcy, of Fornham in the County of Suffolk, was a title in the Baronetage of Great Britain. It was created on 16 August 1782 for Charles Kent, later Member of Parliament for Thetford. He was the son of the London merchant Sir Charles Egleton, Sheriff of London in 1742, and his wife Sarah Kent; he changed his surname to Kent on inheriting from his maternal grandfather Samuel Kent.

The title became extinct on the death of the 3rd Baronet in 1848.

== Kent baronets, of Fornham (1782) ==
- Sir Charles Kent, 1st Baronet (c. 1744–1811)
- Sir Charles Egleton Kent, 2nd Baronet (1784–1834)
- Sir Charles William Egleton Kent, 3rd Baronet (1819–1848)

Baronetage of Great Britain
Preceded by Vane baronets	Kent baronets of Fornham; 16 August 1782	Succeeded by Geary baronets
