= Juliana Marin Fryling =

American-Colombian storyteller and public speaker

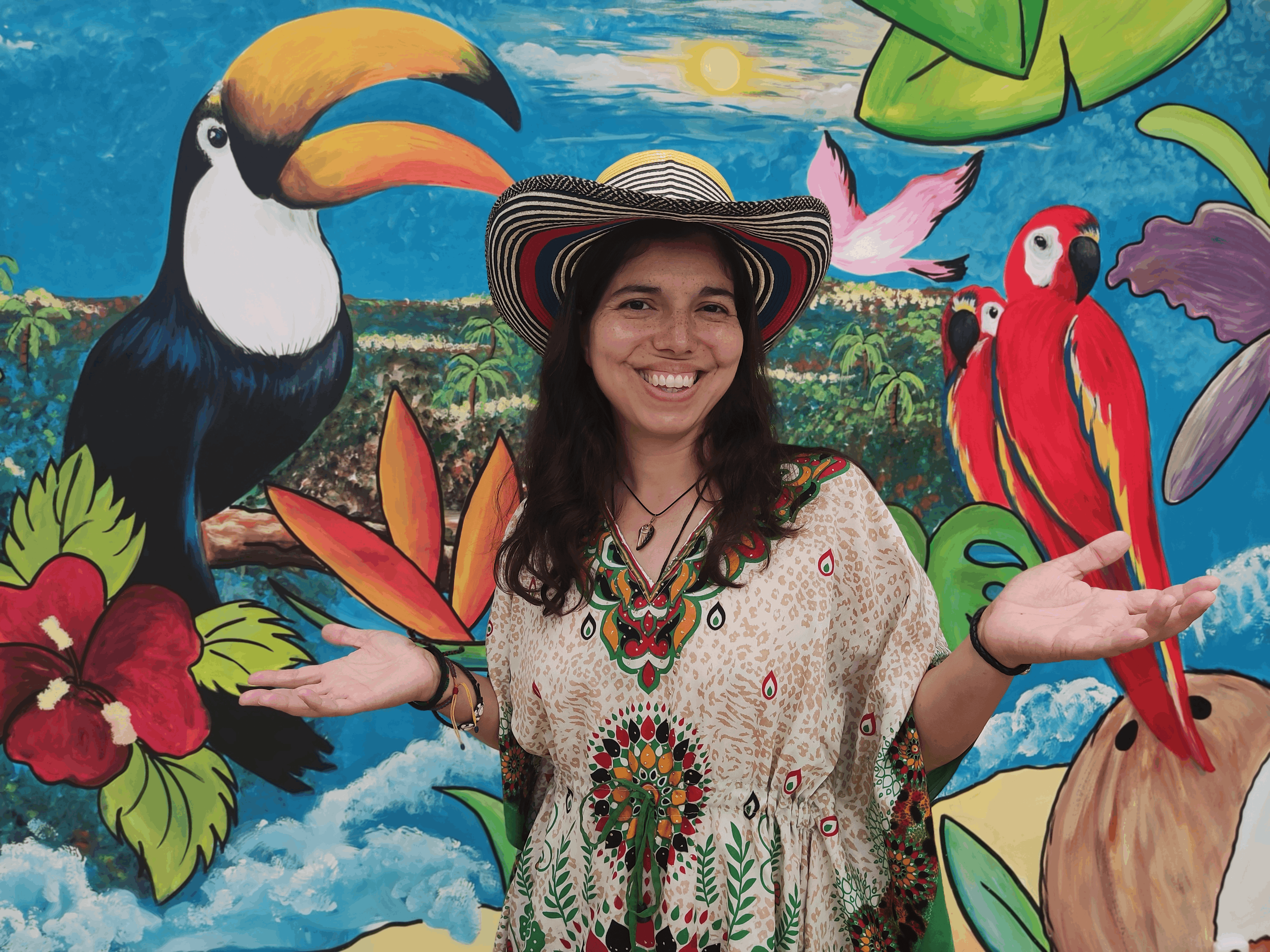
- Juliana with a traditional Colombian outfit
- Born: September 2, 1988 (age 38); Tennessee, United States

Juliana Marin Fryling (born September 2, 1988) is an American-Colombian traditional nomadic storyteller and public speaker.

== Career ==
She graduated as a storyteller from Viva Palabra, a storytelling school in Medellín, in 2015. Since then, she has performed around the world. She performed in Story Oase Festival 2023, Berlin, Germany. In 2023, she performed in the International Storytelling Festival in Marrakesh with John row. The event brought together 80 storytellers from around the world.

In 2025, she took part in the Udaipur Tales Festival in India with a Latin American show and performed kid stories in Kukdukoo Fest.

Her stories are featured in the book "Al Calor De Los Cuentos".

== Early life ==
Marín Fryling was born in Tennessee, United States, and grew up in Medellín, Colombia, during a period of intense drug violence. She and her family experienced multiple break-ins at their home, and her grandfather was murdered during one of these incidents. She was held hostage twice and grew up witnessing violent events, including shoot-outs and bombings. At the age of twelve, her family temporarily relocated to the United States to escape the violence.

Raised in an artistic family, she was surrounded by music, painting, and sculpture. Her grandfather, Jorge Marín Vieco, was a sculptor, and her childhood home, Salsipuedes, contained many works of art. Initially planned to become a writer before discovering a passion for oral storytelling.
