= Thomas Staunton (Ipswich MP) =

Irish and English politician

Member of Parliament for Ipswich
- In office 1757 – 1784 Serving with Samuel Kent (1757-1759); George Montgomerie (1759–1761); The Lord Orwell (1761–1768)

Member of Parliament for Galway Town
- In office 1732 – 1761

Personal details
- Born: c. 1706
- Died: 1 October 1784 (aged 77–78)
- Party: Ipswich Yellow Party
- Spouse(s): Jane Vane; Catherine Thurston
- Children: 4
- Parent: John Staunton (father)
- Education: Trinity College Dublin

Thomas Staunton (1706? – 1 October 1784) was an Irish lawyer and a member of both the Irish and British Parliaments.

== Biography ==
He was the son of John Staunton of Galway, Ireland, who was MP for Galway Town and held the office of Serjeant-at-law (Ireland), and Bridget Donnellan, daughter of Edmund Donnellan, and was educated at Trinity College Dublin from 1723. He was called to the Irish bar in 1729. He then moved to London to study law at the Inner Temple in 1727 and Lincoln's Inn in 1740. He was called to the English bar in 1740.

He was elected to represent Galway Town (his father's old constituency) in the Irish Parliament, sitting from 1732 to 1761. He was a Member of the British Parliament for Ipswich from 1757 to 1784 in the yellow interest.

He married twice; firstly Jane, the daughter of Gilbert Vane, 2nd Baron Barnard and Mary Randyll (Mary was reputed to be a woman of "scandalous life"), and sister of Henry Vane, 1st Earl of Darlington and Anne Vane, mistress of Frederick, Prince of Wales. They had 2 sons, who both predeceased him, and 2 daughters. He married secondly Catherine, the daughter of Thomas Thurston of Holbrook Hall, Suffolk and the widow of William Peck of Little Sampford, Essex (died 1742), who had been a first cousin of Jane Staunton. After his second marriage, he lived at Holbrook Hall.

He was considered a fine Parliamentary orator, but after 1761 there is no record of his speaking in the House. He would clearly have welcomed a Government appointment, but never received one.

Parliament of Great Britain
Preceded by Edward Vernon; Samuel Kent	Member of Parliament for Ipswich; 1757 – 1784; With: Samuel Kent to 1759; George Montgomerie 1759–61; The Lord Orwell 1761–68	Succeeded by William Middleton; John Cator
