= Sir Charles Kent, 1st Baronet =

British landowner and MP

Sir Charles Kent, 1st Baronet (1743? – 14 March 1811) was a British landowner and MP.

He was born Charles Egleton, the only son of Sir Charles Egleton, a London merchant (Sheriff of London for 1743) and his wife Sarah, the daughter of Samuel Kent, MP.

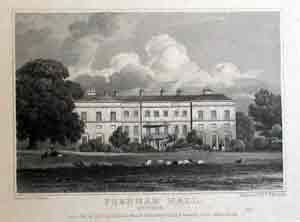
Fornham Hall, c.1820

In 1762 he succeeded his mother's brother to the Fornham estate at Fornham St Genevieve, near Bury St Edmunds, Suffolk and formally adopted the name of Kent. He employed architect James Wyatt to design and build a large new house (Fornham Hall) on the site in the 1770s.

He was selected High Sheriff of Suffolk for 1781–82 and created a baronet in August 1782. He was elected to serve in Parliament as the MP for Thetford from 1784 to 1790.

He died in 1811. He had married in 1771, Mary, the daughter and coheiress of Josias Wordsworth of Wadworth, Yorkshire and Sevenscore, Kent. They had a son, Sir Charles Egleton Kent, 2nd Baronet, who succeeded him, and 3 daughters.

Parliament of Great Britain
Preceded by Richard Hopkins; Earl of Euston	Member of Parliament for Thetford; 1784–1790; With: George Jennings	Succeeded by Robert John Buxton; Joseph Randyll Burch
Baronetage of Great Britain
New creation	Baronet (of Fornham); 1782–1811	Succeeded by Charles Egleton Kent
