= John Row (poet) =

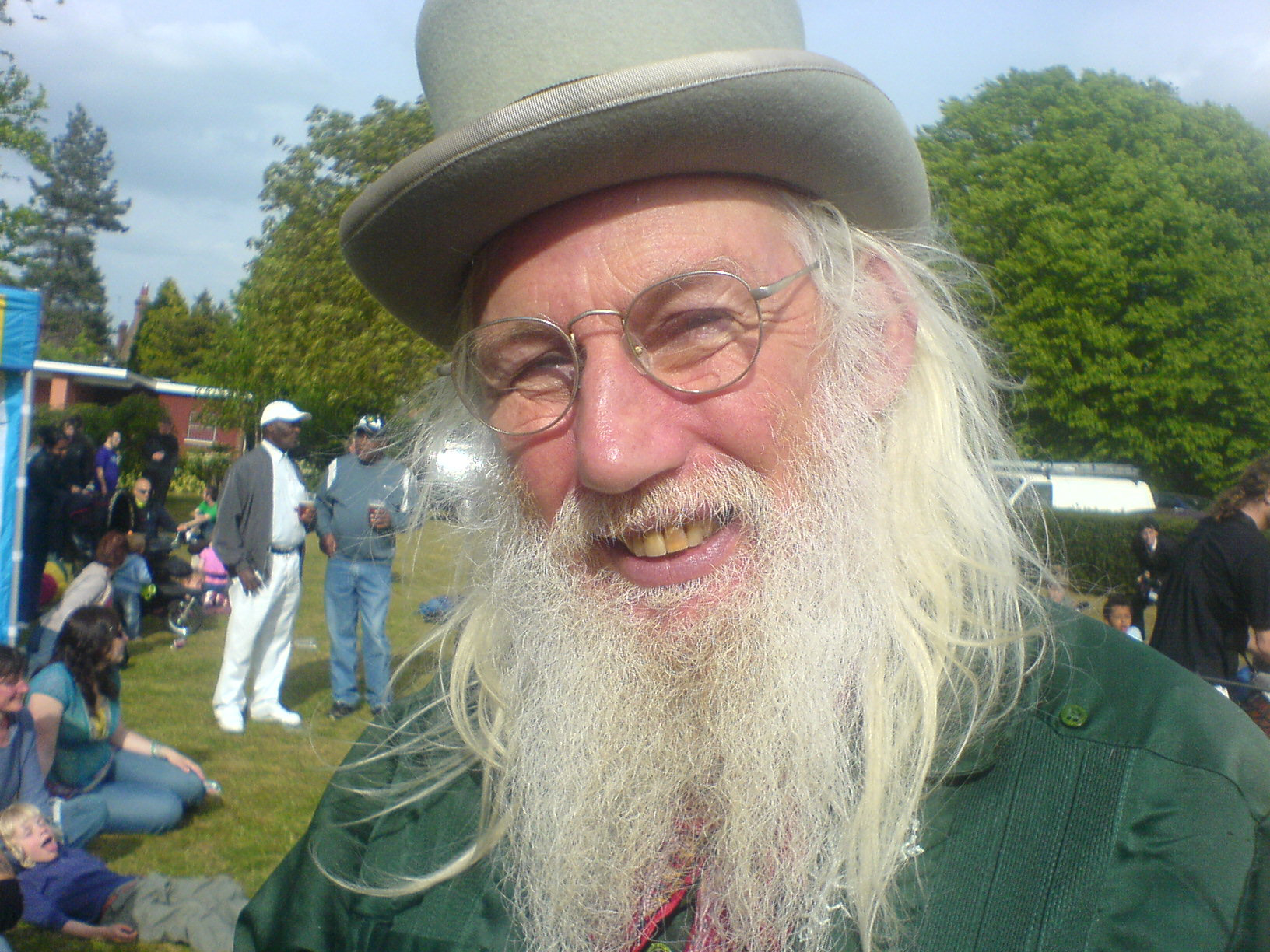
John Row at the Ipswich Mayday (2008) fair in Alexandra Park, Ipswich

John Row (born 1947) is an English storyteller and public speaker.

== Early life and education ==
Row was born in Barking, London, and grew up in Harlow. He has a degree from the University of East Anglia in American studies.

== Career ==
John Row tours schools around the world and other institutions such as prisons. He has been a presence in Texas where he has performed in detention centres for the young inmates. He was the first storyteller in residence in a British prison.

He is the artistic director of the International Storytelling Festival that is celebrated every 2 years in Marrakesh. The festival set a Guinness World Record with 120 hours of continuous non-stop storytelling in 2025.

He has performed at festivals in the UK, and has a weekly radio show on Ipswich Community Radio. He is a contributor to On Track, a magazine for rail travellers in the Southern Region. With singer/songwriter Paddy Stratton he is one half of 'Serious Times', a touring music and poetry show.

Performing in the 1960s, he joined up with Graham Flight from the Canterbury band 'Wild Flowers', which spawned both 'Soft Machine' and 'Caravan'. In the 1970s he toured with Nick Toczek in 'Stereo Graffiti' and in the 1980s and early 1990s with 'Sound Proposition' an anarchic combination of free form jazz, funk and poetry which toured East Germany in the last weeks of its existence.

His book of poems for children, The Pong Machine, was published in 1999.

== Personal life ==
Row lives in Bristol and spends time in Colibita, Romania.
