= John Knox =

Scottish clergyman, writer and historian (1514–1572)

The Reverend John Knox
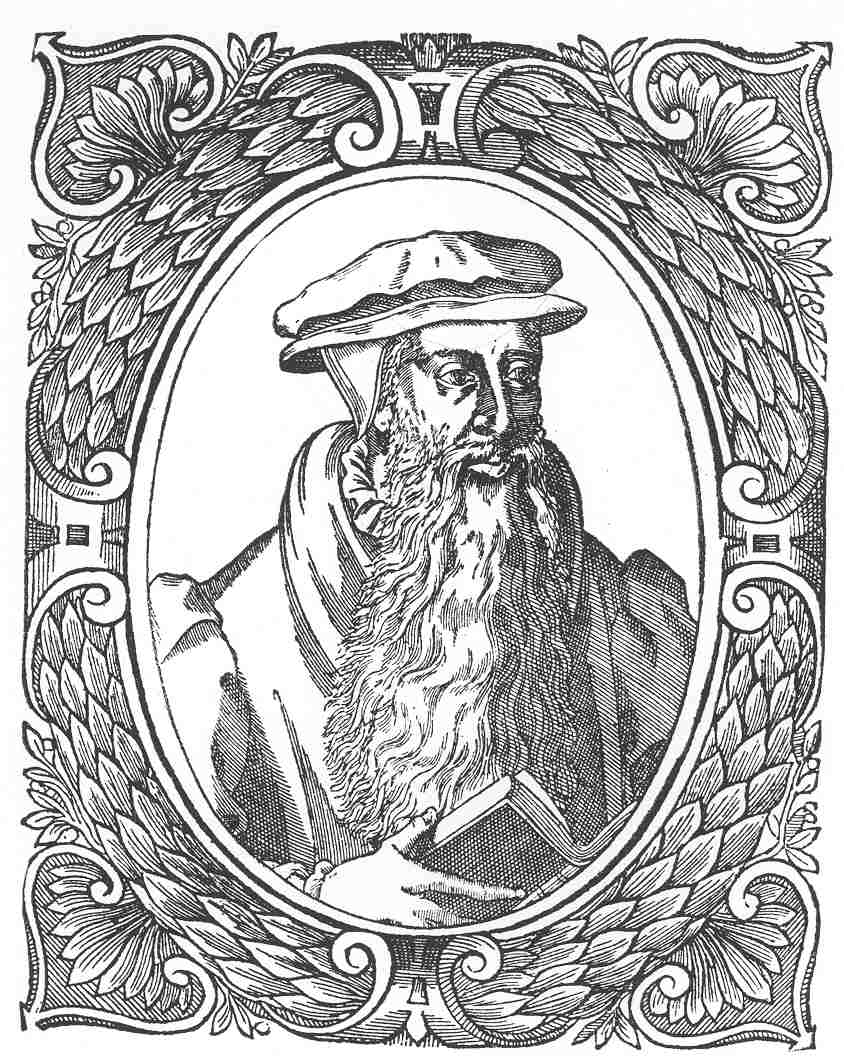
- Portrait of Knox from Theodore Beza's Icones
- Born: c. 1514; Giffordgate, Haddington, Scotland
- Died: 24 November 1572 (aged 58 or 59); Edinburgh, Scotland
- Education: University of St Andrews
- Occupations: Pastor; author; reformer
- Spouses: Margery Bowes (died 1560); Margaret Stewart (m. 1564)
- Children: with Bowes: 2; with Stewart: 3
- Theological work
- Tradition or movement: Presbyterianism

John Knox (c. 1514 – 24 November 1572) was a Scottish minister, Reformed theologian, and writer who was a leader of the country's Reformation. He was the reformer of the Church of Scotland.

Born in Giffordgate, a street in Haddington, East Lothian, Knox is believed to have been educated at the University of St Andrews and worked as a notary-priest. Influenced by early church reformers such as George Wishart, he joined the movement to reform the Scottish Church. He was caught up in the ecclesiastical and political events that involved the murder of Cardinal David Beaton in 1546 and the intervention of the regent Mary of Guise. He was taken prisoner by French forces the following year and exiled to England on his release in 1549.

While in exile, Knox was licensed to work in the Church of England, where he rose in the ranks to serve Edward VI of England as a royal chaplain. He exerted a reforming influence on the text of the Book of Common Prayer. In England, he met and married his first wife, Margery Bowes. When Queen Mary I ascended the throne of England and re-established Catholicism, Knox was forced to resign his position and leave the country. Knox moved to Geneva and then to Frankfurt. In Geneva, he met John Calvin, from whom he gained experience and knowledge of Reformed theology and presbyterian polity. He created a new order of service, The Forme of Prayers, which was eventually adopted by the Reformed Church in Scotland and came to be known as the Book of Common Order. It was the first book printed in any Gaelic language. Knox left Geneva to head the English refugee church in Frankfurt but he was forced to leave over differences concerning the liturgy, thus ending his association with the Church of England.

On his return to Scotland, Knox led the Protestant Reformation in Scotland, in partnership with the Scottish Protestant nobility. The movement may be seen as a revolution since it led to the ousting of Mary of Guise, who governed the country in the name of her young daughter Mary, Queen of Scots. Knox helped write the new confession of faith and the ecclesiastical order for the newly created Reformed Church, the Kirk. He wrote his five-volume The History of the Reformation in Scotland between 1559 and 1566. He continued to serve as the religious leader of the Protestants throughout Mary's reign. In several interviews with the Queen, Knox admonished her for supporting Catholic practices. After she was imprisoned for her alleged role in the murder of her husband Lord Darnley, and King James VI was enthroned in her stead, Knox openly called for her execution. He continued to preach until his final days.

== Early life, 1505–1546 ==
John Knox was born sometime between 1505 and 1515 in or near Haddington, the county town of East Lothian. His father, William Knox, was a merchant. All that is known of his mother is that her maiden name was Sinclair and that she died when John Knox was a child. Their eldest son, William, carried on his father's business, which helped in Knox's international communications.

Knox was probably educated at the Knox Academy grammar school in Haddington. At this time, the priesthood was the only path for those whose inclinations were academic rather than mercantile or agricultural. He proceeded to further studies at the University of St Andrews or possibly at the University of Glasgow. He studied under John Major, one of the greatest scholars of the time. Knox was ordained a Catholic priest in Edinburgh on Easter Eve of 1536 by William Chisholm, Bishop of Dunblane.

Knox first appears in public records as a priest and a notary in 1540. He was still serving in these capacities as late as 1543 when he described himself as a "minister of the sacred altar in the diocese of St Andrews, notary by apostolic authority" in a notarial deed dated 27 March. Rather than taking up duties as a parish priest, Knox became tutor to two sons of Hugh Douglas of Longniddry. He also taught the son of John Cockburn of Ormiston. Both of these lairds had embraced the new religious ideas of the Reformation.

== Embracing the Reformation of 1546–1547 ==
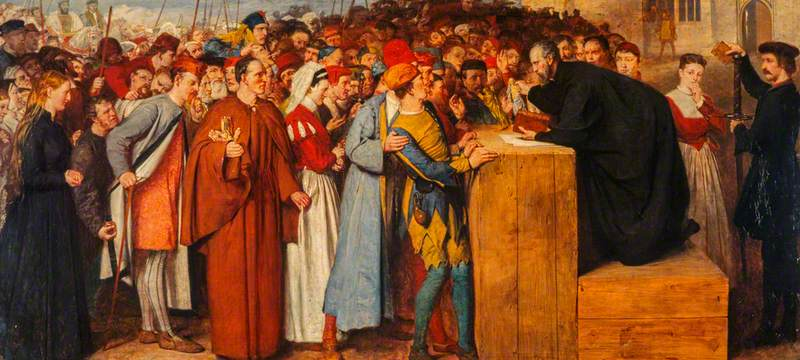
Wishart preaching against Mariolatry, with Knox at his back (far right)

Knox did not record when or how he was converted to the Protestant faith, but perhaps the key formative influences on Knox were Patrick Hamilton and George Wishart. Wishart was a reformer who had fled Scotland in 1538 to escape punishment for heresy. He first moved to England, where in Bristol he preached against the veneration of the Virgin Mary. He was forced to make a public recantation and was burned in effigy at the Church of St Nicholas as a sign of his abjuration. He then took refuge in Germany and Switzerland. While on the Continent, he translated the First Helvetic Confession into English. He returned to Scotland in 1544, but the timing of his return was unfortunate. In December 1543, James Hamilton, Duke of Châtellerault, the appointed regent for the infant Mary, Queen of Scots, had decided with the Queen Mother, Mary of Guise, and Cardinal David Beaton to persecute the Protestant sect that had taken root in Scotland. Wishart travelled throughout Scotland preaching in favour of the Reformation, and when he arrived in East Lothian, Knox became one of his closest associates. Knox acted as his bodyguard, bearing a two-handed sword in order to defend him. In December 1545, Wishart was seized on Beaton's orders by the Earl of Bothwell and taken to the Castle of St Andrews. Knox was present on the night of Wishart's arrest and was prepared to follow him into captivity, but Wishart persuaded him against this course saying, "Nay, return to your bairns [children] and God bless you. One is sufficient for a sacrifice." Wishart was subsequently prosecuted by Beaton's Public Accuser of Heretics, Archdeacon John Lauder. On 1 March 1546, he was burnt at the stake in the presence of Beaton.

Knox had avoided being arrested by Lord Bothwell through Wishart's advice to return to tutoring. He took shelter with Douglas in Longniddry. Several months later he was still in charge of the pupils, the sons of Douglas and Cockburn, who wearied of moving from place to place while being pursued. He toyed with the idea of fleeing to Germany and taking his pupils with him. While Knox remained a fugitive, Beaton was murdered on 29 May 1546, within his residence, the Castle of St Andrews, by a gang of five persons in revenge for Wishart's execution. The assassins seized the castle and eventually their families and friends took refuge with them, about a hundred and fifty men in all. Among their friends was Henry Balnaves, a former secretary of state in the government, who negotiated with England for the financial support of the rebels. Douglas and Cockburn suggested to Knox to take their sons to the relative safety of the castle to continue their instruction in reformed doctrine, and Knox arrived at the castle on 10 April 1547.

Knox's powers as a preacher came to the attention of the chaplain of the garrison, John Rough. While Rough was preaching in the parish church on the Protestant principle of the popular election of a pastor, he proposed Knox to the congregation for that office. Knox did not relish the idea. According to his own account, he burst into tears and fled to his room. Within a week, however, he was giving his first sermon to a congregation that included his old teacher, John Major. He expounded on the seventh chapter of the Book of Daniel, comparing the Pope with the Antichrist. His sermon was marked by his consideration of the Bible as his sole authority and the doctrine of justification by faith alone, two elements that would remain in his thoughts throughout the rest of his life. A few days later, a debate was staged that allowed him to lay down additional theses including the rejection of the Mass, Purgatory, and prayers for the dead.

== Confinement in the French galleys, 1547–1549 ==
John Knox's chaplaincy of the castle garrison was not to last long. While Hamilton was willing to negotiate with England to stop their support of the rebels and bring the castle back under his control, Mary of Guise decided that it could be taken only by force and requested the king of France, Henry II to intervene. On 29 June 1547, 21 French galleys approached St Andrews under the command of Leone Strozzi, prior of Capua. The French besieged the castle and forced the surrender of the garrison on 31 July. The Protestant nobles and others, including Knox, were taken prisoner and forced to row in the French galleys. The galley slaves were chained to benches and rowed throughout the day without a change of posture while an officer watched over them with a whip in hand. They sailed to France and navigated up the Seine to Rouen. The nobles, some of whom would have a bearing on Knox's later life such as William Kirkcaldy and Henry Balnaves, were sent to various castle-prisons in France. Knox and the other galley slaves continued to Nantes and stayed on the Loire throughout the winter. They were threatened with torture if they did not give proper signs of reverence when mass was performed on the ship. Knox recounted an incident in which one of the prisoners—possibly himself, as Knox tended to narrate personal anecdotes in the third person—was required to show devotion to a picture of the Virgin Mary. The prisoner was told to give it a kiss of veneration. He refused and when the picture was pushed up to his face, the prisoner seized the picture and threw it into the sea, saying, "Let our Lady now save herself: she is light enough: let her learn to swim." After that, according to Knox, the Scottish prisoners were no longer forced to perform such devotions.

In mid-1548, the galleys returned to Scotland to scout for English ships. Knox's health was now at its lowest point due to the severity of his confinement. He was ill with a fever and others on the ship were afraid for his life. Even in this state, Knox recalled, his mind remained sharp and he comforted his fellow prisoners with hopes of release. While the ships were lying offshore between St Andrews and Dundee, the spires of the parish church where he preached appeared in view. James Balfour, a fellow prisoner, asked Knox whether he recognised the landmark. He replied that he knew it well, recognising the steeple of the place where he first preached and he declared that he would not die until he had preached there again.

In February 1549, after spending a total of 19 months in the galley-prison, Knox was released. It is uncertain how he obtained his liberty. Later in the year, Henry II arranged with Edward VI of England the release of all remaining Castilian prisoners.

== Exile in England, 1549–1554 ==
On his release, Knox took refuge in England. The Reformation in England was a less radical movement than its Continental counterparts, but there was a definite breach with Rome. The Archbishop of Canterbury, Thomas Cranmer, and the regent of King Edward VI, the Duke of Somerset, were decidedly Protestant-minded. However, much work remained to bring reformed ideas to the clergy and to the people. On 7 April 1549, Knox was licensed to work in the Church of England. His first commission was in Berwick-upon-Tweed. He was obliged to use the recently released 1549 Book of Common Prayer, which maintained the structure of the Sarum Rite while adapting the content to the doctrine of the reformed Church of England. Knox, however, modified its use to accord with the doctrinal emphases of the Continental reformers. In the pulpit, he preached Protestant doctrines with great effect as his congregation grew.

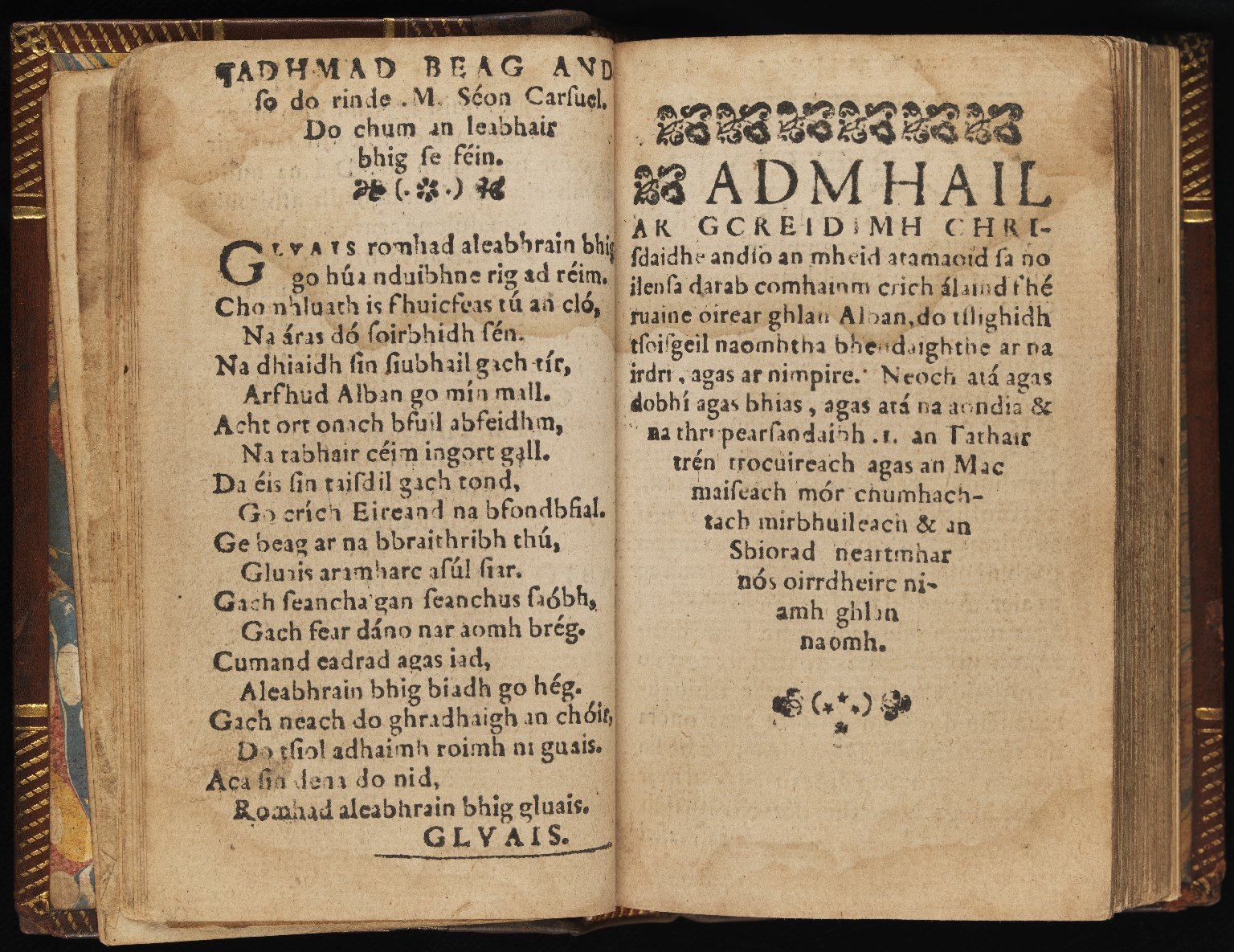
Frontispiece to the Scots Gaelic translation of John Knox's Liturgy, 1567

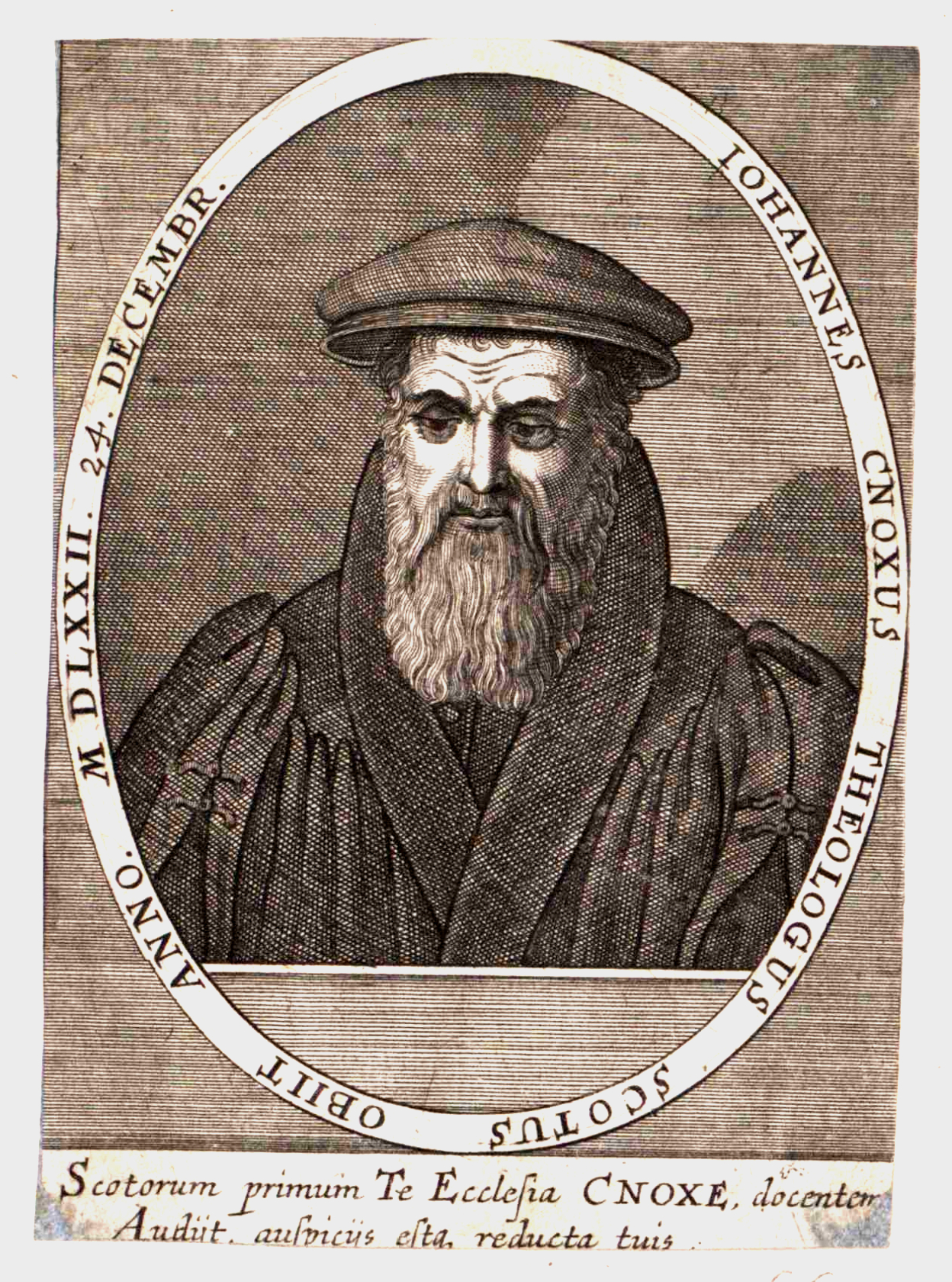
John Knox portrait bearing the date 1572

In England, Knox met his wife, Margery Bowes (died c. 1560). Her father, Richard Bowes (died 1558), was a descendant of an old Durham family and her mother, Elizabeth Aske, was an heiress of a Yorkshire family, the Askes of Richmondshire. Elizabeth presumably met Knox when he was employed in Berwick. Several letters reveal a close friendship between them. It is not recorded when Knox married Margery Bowes. Knox attempted to obtain the consent of the Bowes family, but her father and her brother Robert Bowes were opposed to the marriage.

Towards the end of 1550, Knox was appointed a preacher of St Nicholas' Church in Newcastle upon Tyne. The following year he was appointed one of the six royal chaplains serving the King. On 16 October 1551, John Dudley, 1st Duke of Northumberland, overthrew the Duke of Somerset to become the new regent of the young King. Knox condemned the coup d'état in a sermon on All Saints Day. When Dudley visited Newcastle and listened to his preaching in June 1552, he had mixed feelings about the firebrand preacher, but he saw Knox as a potential asset. Knox was asked to come to London to preach before the Court. In his first sermon, he advocated a change for the 1552 Book of Common Prayer. The liturgy required worshippers to kneel during communion. Knox and the other chaplains considered this to be idolatry. It triggered a debate where Archbishop Cranmer was called upon to defend the practice. The result was a compromise in which the famous Black Rubric, which declared that no adoration is intended while kneeling, was included in the second edition.

Soon afterwards, Dudley, who saw Knox as a useful political tool, offered him the bishopric of Rochester. Knox refused, and he returned to Newcastle. On 2 February 1553 Cranmer was ordered to appoint Knox as vicar of All Hallows, Bread Street, in London, placing him under the authority of the Bishop of London, Nicholas Ridley. Knox returned to London in order to deliver a sermon before the King and the Court during Lent and he again refused to take the assigned post. Knox was then told to preach in Buckinghamshire and he remained there until Edward's death on 6 July. Edward's successor, Mary Tudor, re-established Roman Catholicism in England and restored the Mass in all the churches. With the country no longer safe for Protestant preachers, Knox left for the Continent in January 1554 on the advice of friends. On the eve of his flight, he wrote:

Sometime I have thought that impossible it had been, so to have removed my affection from the realm of Scotland, that any realm or nation could have been equal dear to me. But God I take to record in my conscience, that the troubles present (and appearing to be) in the realm of England are double more dolorous unto my heart than ever were the troubles of Scotland.

== From Geneva to Frankfurt and Scotland, 1554–1556 ==
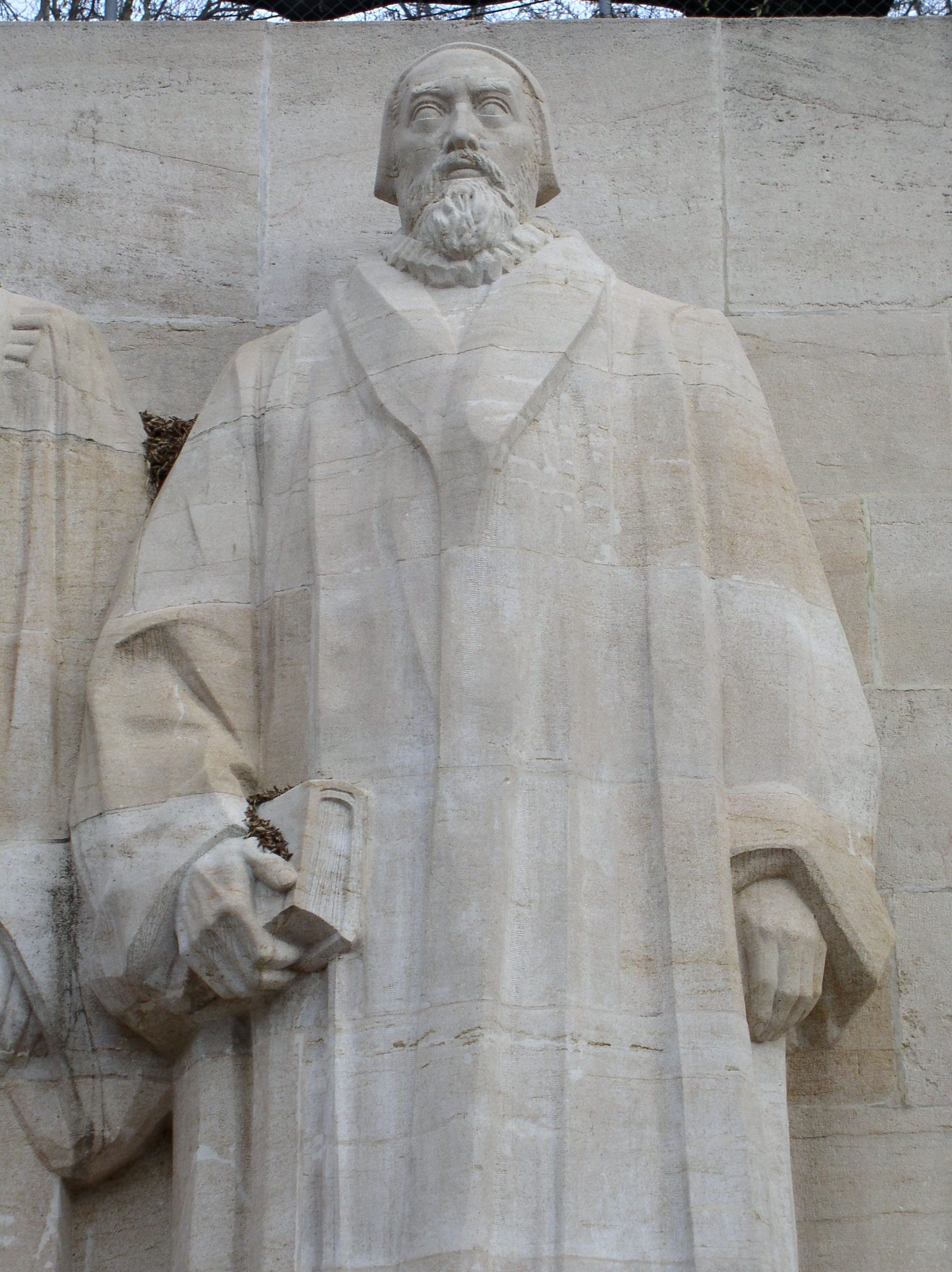
Statue of John Knox at the Reformation Wall monument in Geneva

Knox disembarked in Dieppe, France, and continued to Geneva, where John Calvin had established his authority. When Knox arrived, Calvin was in a difficult position. He had recently overseen the Company of Pastors, which prosecuted charges of heresy against the scholar Michael Servetus, although Calvin himself was not capable of voting for or against a civil penalty against Servetus. Knox asked Calvin four difficult political questions: whether a minor could rule by divine right, whether a female could rule and transfer sovereignty to her husband, whether people should obey ungodly or idolatrous rulers, and what party godly persons should follow if they resisted an idolatrous ruler. Calvin gave cautious replies and referred him to the Swiss reformer Heinrich Bullinger in Zurich. Bullinger's responses were equally cautious, but Knox had already made up his mind. On 20 July 1554, he published a pamphlet attacking Mary Tudor and the bishops who had brought her to the throne. He also attacked the Holy Roman Emperor, Charles V, calling him "no less enemy to Christ than was Nero".

In a letter dated 24 September 1554, Knox received an invitation from a congregation of English exiles in Frankfurt to become one of their ministers. He accepted the call with Calvin's blessing. But no sooner had he arrived than he found himself in a conflict. The first set of refugees to arrive in Frankfurt had subscribed to a reformed liturgy and used a modified version of the Book of Common Prayer. More recently arrived refugees, however, including Edmund Grindal, the future Archbishop of Canterbury, favoured a stricter application of the book. When Knox and a supporting colleague, William Whittingham, wrote to Calvin for advice, they were told to avoid contention. Knox therefore agreed on a temporary order of service based on a compromise between the two sides. This delicate balance was disturbed when a new batch of refugees arrived that included Richard Cox, one of the principal authors of the Book of Common Prayer. Cox brought Knox's pamphlet attacking the emperor to the attention of the Frankfurt authorities, who advised that Knox leave. His departure from Frankfurt on 26 March 1555 marked his final breach with the Church of England.

After his return to Geneva, Knox was chosen to be the minister at a new place of worship petitioned from Calvin. As such, he exerted an influence on French Protestants, whether they were exiled in Geneva or in France. In the meantime, Elizabeth Bowes wrote to Knox, asking him to return to Margery in Scotland, which he did at the end of August. Despite initial doubts about the state of the Reformation in Scotland, Knox found the country significantly changed since he was carried off in the galley in 1547. When he toured various parts of Scotland preaching the reformed doctrines and liturgy, he was welcomed by many of the nobility including two future regents of Scotland, the Earl of Moray and the Earl of Mar.

Though the Queen Regent, Mary of Guise, made no move against Knox, his activities caused concern among the church authorities. The bishops of Scotland viewed him as a threat to their authority and summoned him to appear in Edinburgh on 15 May 1556. He was accompanied to the trial by so many influential persons that the bishops decided to call the hearing off. Knox was now free to preach openly in Edinburgh. William Keith, the Earl Marischal, was impressed and urged Knox to write to the Queen Regent. Knox's unusually respectful letter urged her to support the Reformation and overthrow the church hierarchy. Queen Mary took the letter as a joke and ignored it.

== Return to Geneva, 1556–1559 ==
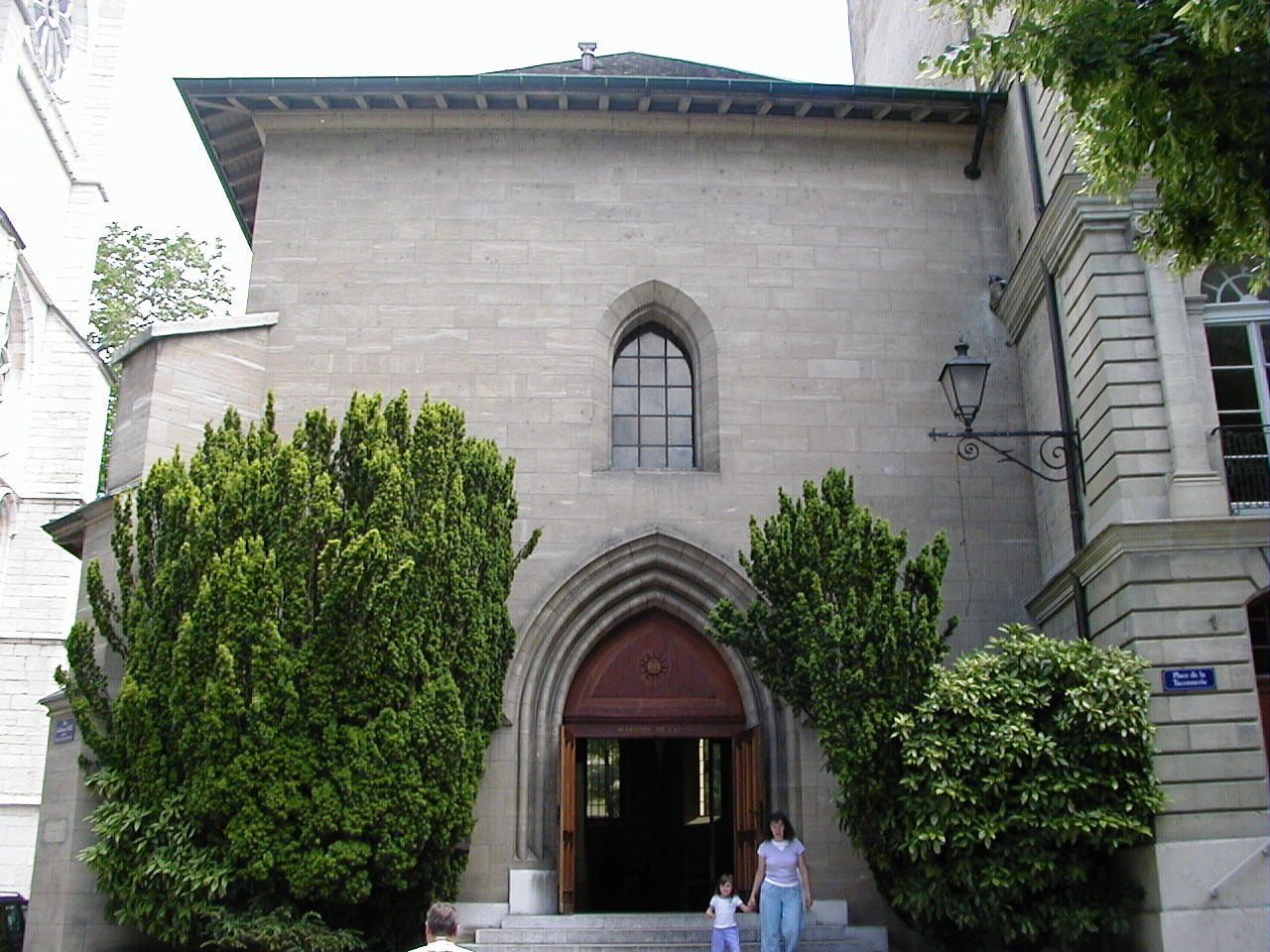
The Auditoire de Calvin where Knox preached while in Geneva, 1556–1558

Shortly after Knox sent the letter to the Queen Regent, he suddenly announced that he felt his duty was to return to Geneva. In the previous year on 1 November 1555, the congregation in Geneva had elected Knox as their minister and he decided to take up the post. He wrote a final letter of advice to his supporters and left Scotland with his wife and mother-in-law. He arrived in Geneva on 13 September 1556.

For the next two years, he lived a happy life in Geneva. He recommended Geneva to his friends in England as the best place of asylum for Protestants. In one letter he wrote:

I neither fear nor eschame to say, is the most perfect school of Christ that ever was in the earth since the days of the apostles. In other places I confess Christ to be truly preached; but manners and religion so sincerely reformed, I have not yet seen in any other place ...

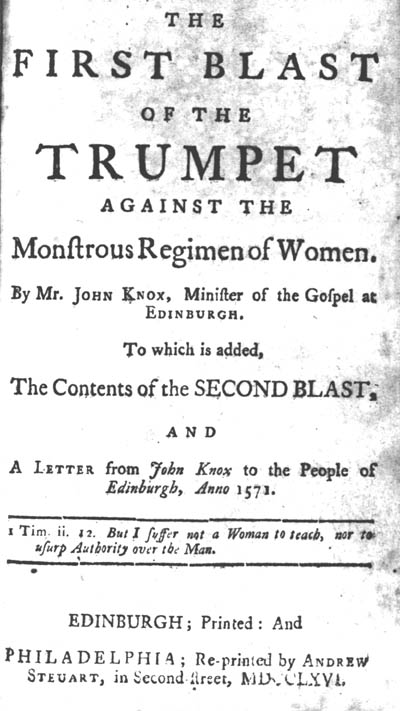
The title page of The First Blast from a 1766 edition with modernised spelling

Knox led a busy life in Geneva. He preached three sermons a week, each lasting well over two hours. The services used a liturgy that was derived by Knox and other ministers from Calvin's Formes des Prières Ecclésiastiques. According to Laing, this order of service with some additions eventually became the Book of Common Order of the Kirk in 1565. The church in which Knox preached, the Église de Notre Dame la Neuve—now known as the Auditoire de Calvin—had been granted by the municipal authorities, at Calvin's request, for the use of the English and Italian congregations. Knox's two sons, Nathaniel and Eleazar, were born in Geneva, with Whittingham and Myles Coverdale their respective godfathers.

In mid-1558, Knox published his best-known pamphlet, The first blast of the trumpet against the monstruous regiment of women. In calling the "regimen" or rule of women "monstruous", he meant that it was "unnatural". Knox states that his purpose was to demonstrate "how abominable before God is the Empire or Rule of a wicked woman, yea, of a traiteresse and bastard". The women rulers that Knox had in mind were Queen Mary I of England and Mary of Guise, the Dowager Queen of Scotland and regent on behalf of her daughter, Mary, Queen of Scots. This biblical position was not unusual in Knox's day; however, even he was aware that the pamphlet was dangerously seditious. He therefore published it anonymously and did not tell Calvin, who denied knowledge of it until a year after its publication, that he had written it. In England, the pamphlet was officially condemned by royal proclamation. The impact of the document was complicated later that year when Elizabeth Tudor, a Protestant, became Queen of England. Although Knox had not targeted Elizabeth, he had deeply offended her, and she never forgave him.

With a Protestant on the throne, the English refugees in Geneva prepared to return home. Knox himself decided to return to Scotland. Before his departure, various honours were conferred on him, including the freedom of the city of Geneva. Knox left in January 1559, but he did not arrive in Scotland until 2 May 1559, owing to Elizabeth's refusal to issue him a passport through England.

== Revolution and end of the regency, 1559–1560 ==
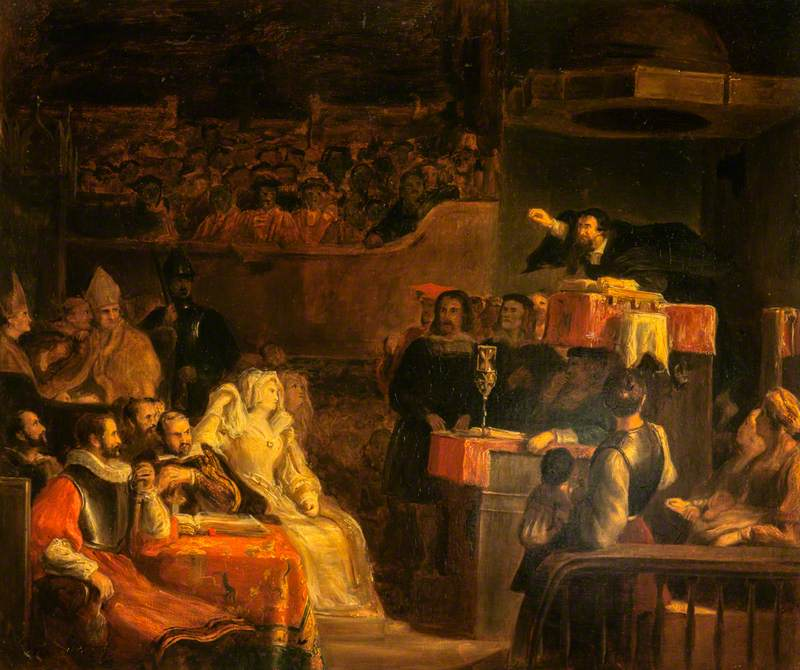
The Preaching of John Knox Before the Lords of the Congregation (in the Parish Church of St. Andrew's, 10 June 1559) by David Wilkie

Two days after Knox arrived in Edinburgh, he proceeded to Dundee where a large number of Protestant sympathisers had gathered. Knox was declared an outlaw, and the Queen Regent summoned the Protestants to Stirling. Fearing the possibility of a summary trial and execution, the Protestants proceeded instead to Perth, a walled town that could be defended in case of a siege. At the church of St John the Baptist, Knox preached a fiery sermon on 11 May 1559 and a small incident precipitated into a riot. A mob poured into the church and it was soon gutted. The mob then attacked two friaries (Blackfriars and Greyfriars) in the town, looting their gold and silver and smashing images. Mary of Guise gathered those nobles loyal to her and a small French army. She dispatched the Earl of Argyll and Lord Moray to offer terms and avert a war. She promised not to send any French troops into Perth if the Protestants evacuated the town. The Protestants agreed, but when the Queen Regent entered Perth, she garrisoned it with Scottish soldiers on the French payroll. This was seen as treacherous by Lord Argyll and Lord Moray, who both switched sides and joined Knox, who now based himself in St Andrews. Knox's return to St Andrews fulfilled the prophecy he made in the galleys that he would one day preach again in its church. When he did give a sermon, the effect was the same as in Perth. The people engaged in vandalism and looting. In June 1559, a Protestant mob incited by the preaching of John Knox ransacked the cathedral; the interior of the building was destroyed. The cathedral fell into decline following the attack and became a source of building material for the town. By 1561 it had been abandoned and left to fall into ruin.

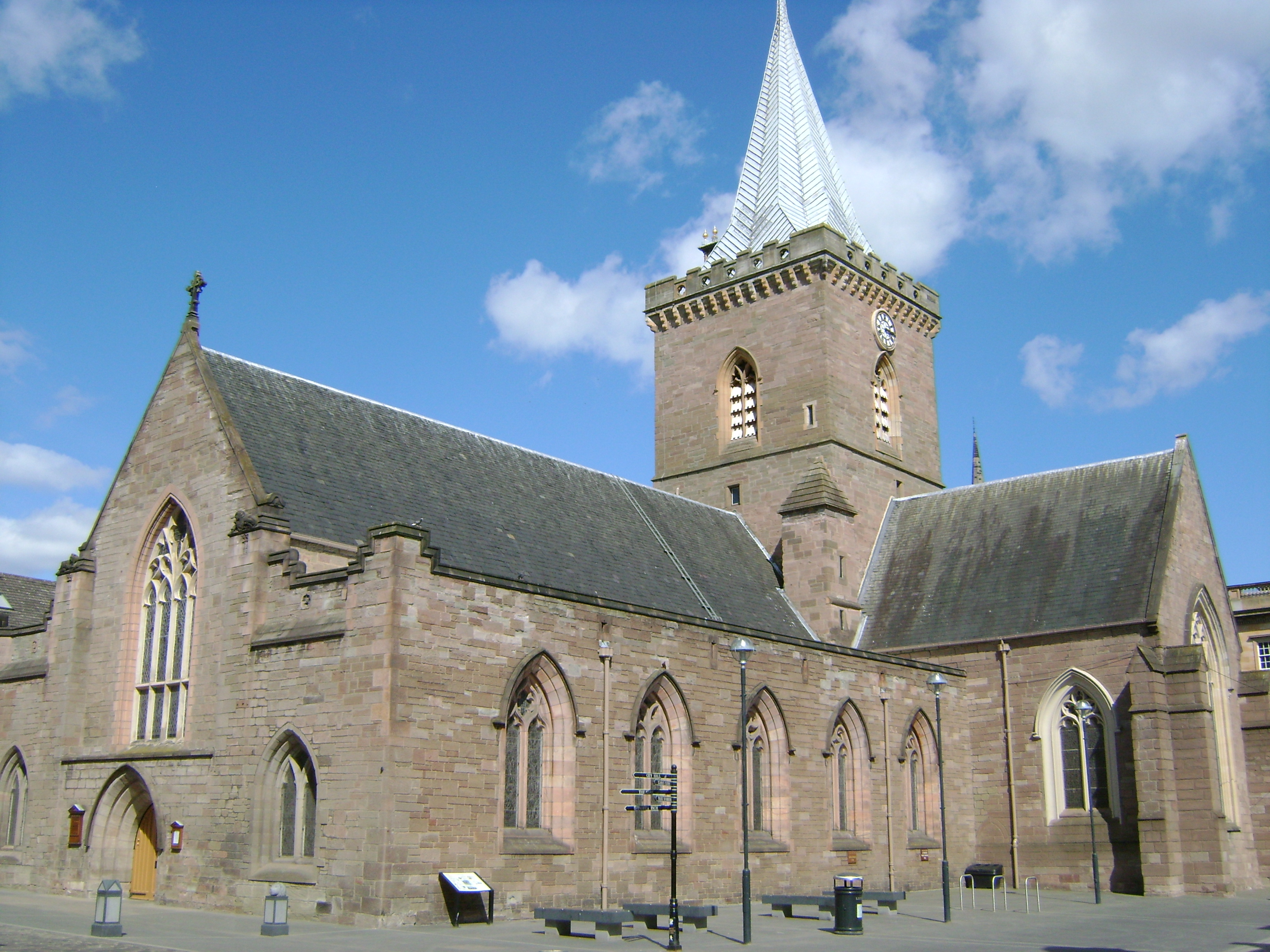
Perth's St John's Kirk in modern times

With Protestant reinforcements arriving from neighbouring counties, the Queen Regent retreated to Dunbar. By now, the mob fury had spilled over central Scotland. Her own troops were on the verge of mutiny. On 30 June, the Protestant Lords of the Congregation occupied Edinburgh, though they were able to hold it for only a month. But even before their arrival, the mob had already sacked the churches and the friaries. On 1 July, Knox preached from the pulpit of St Giles', the most influential in the capital. The Lords of the Congregation negotiated their withdrawal from Edinburgh by the Articles of Leith signed 25 July 1559, and Mary of Guise promised freedom of conscience.

Knox knew that the Queen Regent would ask for help from France, so he negotiated by letter under the assumed name John Sinclair with William Cecil, Elizabeth's chief adviser, for English support. Knox sailed secretly to Lindisfarne, off the northeast coast of England at the end of July, to meet James Croft and Sir Henry Percy at Berwick upon Tweed. Knox was indiscreet and news of his mission soon reached Mary of Guise. He returned to Edinburgh telling Croft he had to return to his flock, and suggested that Henry Balnaves should go to Cecil.

When additional French troops arrived in Leith, Edinburgh's seaport, the Protestants responded by retaking Edinburgh. This time, on 24 October 1559, the Scottish nobility formally deposed Mary of Guise from the regency. Her secretary, William Maitland of Lethington, defected to the Protestant side, bringing his administrative skills. From then on, Maitland took over the political tasks, freeing Knox for the role of religious leader. For the final stage of the revolution, Maitland appealed to Scottish patriotism to fight French domination. Following the Treaty of Berwick, support from England finally arrived and by the end of March, a significant English army joined the Scottish Protestant forces. The sudden death of Mary of Guise in Edinburgh Castle on 10 June 1560 paved the way for an end to hostilities, the signing of the Treaty of Edinburgh, and the withdrawal of French and English troops from Scotland. On 19 July, Knox held a National Thanksgiving Service at St Giles'.

== Reformation in Scotland, 1560–1561 ==
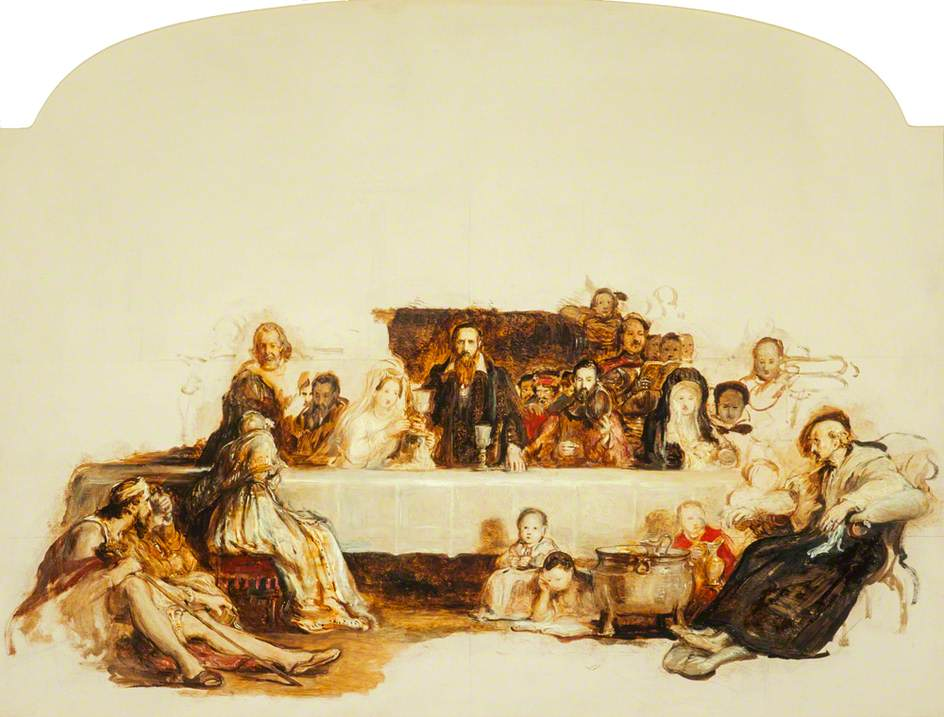
Study for John Knox Dispensing the Sacrament at Calder House by David Wilkie. The work was intended as a companion to Wilkie's Preaching of Knox before the Lords of the Congregation above.

On 1 August, the Scottish Parliament met to settle religious issues. Knox and five other ministers, all called John, were called upon to draw up a new confession of faith. Within four days, the Scots Confession was presented to Parliament, voted upon, and approved. A week later, the Parliament passed three acts in one day: the first abolished the jurisdiction of the Pope in Scotland, the second condemned all doctrine and practice contrary to the reformed faith, and the third forbade the celebration of Mass in Scotland. Before the dissolution of Parliament, Knox and the other ministers were given the task of organising the newly reformed church or the Kirk. They would work for several months on the Book of Discipline, the document describing the organisation of the new church. During this period, in December 1560, Knox's wife, Margery, died, leaving Knox to care for their two sons, aged three and a half and two years old. John Calvin, who had lost his own wife in 1549, wrote a letter of condolence.

Parliament reconvened on 15 January 1561 to consider the Book of Discipline. The Kirk was to be run on democratic lines. Each congregation was free to choose or reject its own pastor, but once he was chosen he could not be fired. Each parish was to be self-supporting, as far as possible. The bishops were replaced by ten to twelve "superintendents". The plan included a system of national education based on universality as a fundamental principle. Certain areas of law were placed under ecclesiastical authority. The Parliament did not approve the plan, however, mainly for reasons of finance. The Kirk was to be financed out of the patrimony of the Roman Catholic Church in Scotland. Much of this was now in the hands of the nobles, who were reluctant to give up their possessions. A final decision on the plan was delayed because of the impending return of Mary, Queen of Scots.

== Knox and Queen Mary, 1561–1564 ==
On 19 August 1561, cannons were fired in Leith to announce Queen Mary's arrival in Scotland. When she attended Mass being celebrated in the royal chapel at Holyrood Palace five days later, this prompted a protest in which one of her servants was jostled. The next day she issued a proclamation that there would be no alteration in the current state of religion and that her servants should not be molested or troubled. Many nobles accepted this, but not Knox. The following Sunday, he protested from the pulpit of St Giles'. As a result, just two weeks after her return, Mary summoned Knox. She accused him of inciting a rebellion against her mother and of writing a book against her own authority. Knox answered that as long as her subjects found her rule convenient, he was willing to accept her governance, noting that Paul the Apostle had been willing to live under Nero's rule. Mary noted, however, that he had written against the principle of female rule itself. He responded that she should not be troubled by what had never harmed her. When Mary asked him whether subjects had a right to resist their ruler, he replied that if monarchs exceeded their lawful limits, they might be resisted, even by force.

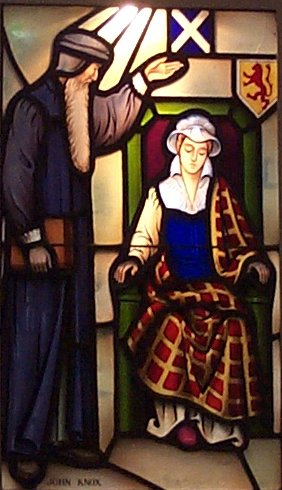
Stained glass window showing John Knox admonishing Mary, Queen of Scots

On 13 December 1562, Mary sent for Knox again after he gave a sermon denouncing certain celebrations which Knox had interpreted as rejoicing at the expense of the Reformation. She charged that Knox spoke irreverently of the Queen in order to make her appear contemptible to her subjects. After Knox gave an explanation of the sermon, Mary stated that she did not blame Knox for the differences of opinion and asked that in the future he come to her directly if he heard anything about her that he disliked. Despite her gesture, Knox replied that he would continue to voice his convictions in his sermons and would not wait upon her.

During Easter in 1563, some priests in Ayrshire celebrated Mass, thus defying the law. Some Protestants tried to enforce the law themselves by apprehending these priests. This prompted Mary to summon Knox for the third time. She asked Knox to use his influence to promote religious toleration. He defended their actions and noted she was bound to uphold the laws and if she did not, others would. Mary surprised Knox by agreeing that the priests would be brought to justice.

The most dramatic interview between Mary and Knox took place on 24 June 1563. Mary summoned Knox to Holyrood after hearing that he had been preaching against her proposed marriage to Don Carlos, the son of Philip II of Spain. Mary began by scolding Knox, then she burst into tears. "What have ye to do with my marriage?" she asked, and "What are ye within this commonwealth?" "A subject born within the same, Madam," Knox replied. He noted that though he was not of noble birth, he had the same duty as any subject to warn of dangers to the realm. When Mary started to cry again, he said, "Madam, in God's presence I speak: I never delighted in the weeping of any of God's creatures; yea I can scarcely well abide the tears of my own boys whom my own hand corrects, much less can I rejoice in your Majesty's weeping." He added that he would rather endure her tears, however, than remain silent and "betray my Commonwealth". At this, Mary ordered him out of the room.

Knox's final encounter with Mary was prompted by an incident at Holyrood. While Mary was absent from Edinburgh on her summer progress in 1563, a crowd forced its way into her private chapel as Mass was being celebrated. During the altercation, the priest's life was threatened. As a result, two of the ringleaders, burgesses of Edinburgh, were scheduled for trial on 24 October 1563. In order to defend these men, Knox sent out letters calling the nobles to convene. Mary obtained one of these letters and asked her advisors if this was not a treasonable act. Stewart and Maitland, wanting to keep good relations with both the Kirk and the Queen, asked Knox to admit he was wrong and to settle the matter quietly. Knox refused and he defended himself in front of Mary and the Privy Council. He argued that he had called a legal, not an illegal, assembly as part of his duties as a minister of the Kirk. After he left, the councillors voted not to charge him with treason.

== Final years in Edinburgh, 1564–1572 ==
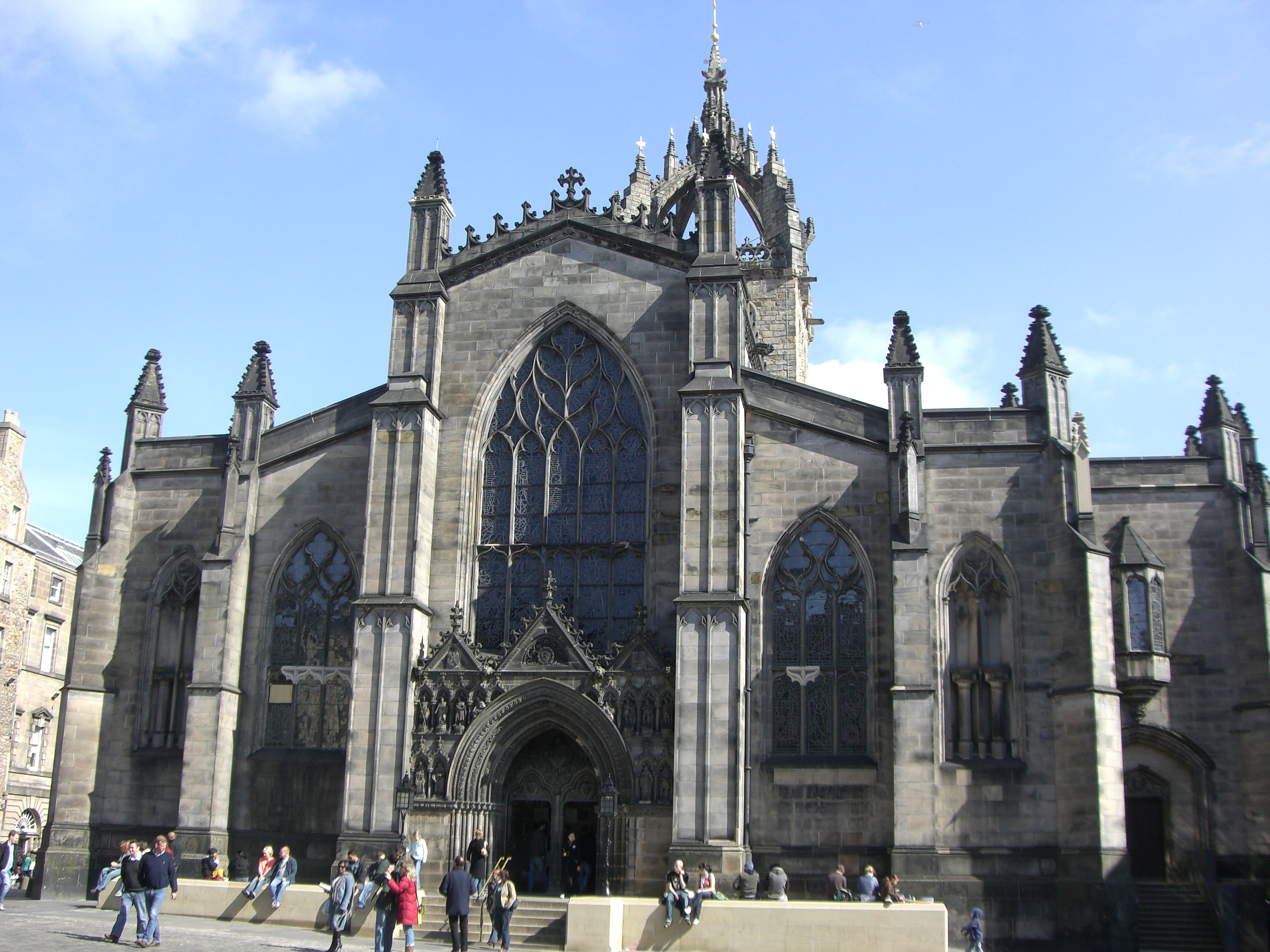
The High Kirk of Edinburgh, where Knox served as minister from 1560 to 1572. He preached with the help of a reader for the first two years until John Craig was appointed as a colleague, being transferred from Holyroodhouse in 1562; Craig ministered at St Giles' for 9 years.

On 26 March 1564, Knox stirred controversy again when he married Margaret Stewart, the daughter of an old friend, Andrew Stewart, 2nd Lord Ochiltree, a member of the Stuart family and a distant relative of the Queen, Mary Stuart. The marriage was unusual because he was a widower of fifty, while the bride was only seventeen. Very few details are known of their domestic life. They had three daughters, Martha, Margaret, and Elizabeth.

When the General Assembly convened in June 1564, an argument broke out between Knox and Maitland over the authority of the civil government. Maitland told Knox to refrain from stirring up emotions over Mary's insistence on having mass celebrated and he quoted from Martin Luther and John Calvin about obedience to earthly rulers. Knox retorted that the Bible notes that Israel was punished when it followed an unfaithful king and that the Continental reformers were refuting arguments made by the Anabaptists who rejected all forms of government. The debate revealed his waning influence on political events as the nobility continued to support Mary.

After the wedding of Mary and Henry Stuart, Lord Darnley, on 29 July 1565, some of the Protestant nobles, including James Stewart, 1st Earl of Moray, rose up in a rebellion known as the "Chaseabout Raid". Knox revealed his own objection to the marriage while preaching in the presence of the new King Consort on 19 August 1565. He made passing allusions to ungodly rulers which caused Darnley to walk out. Knox was summoned and prohibited from preaching while the court was in Edinburgh.

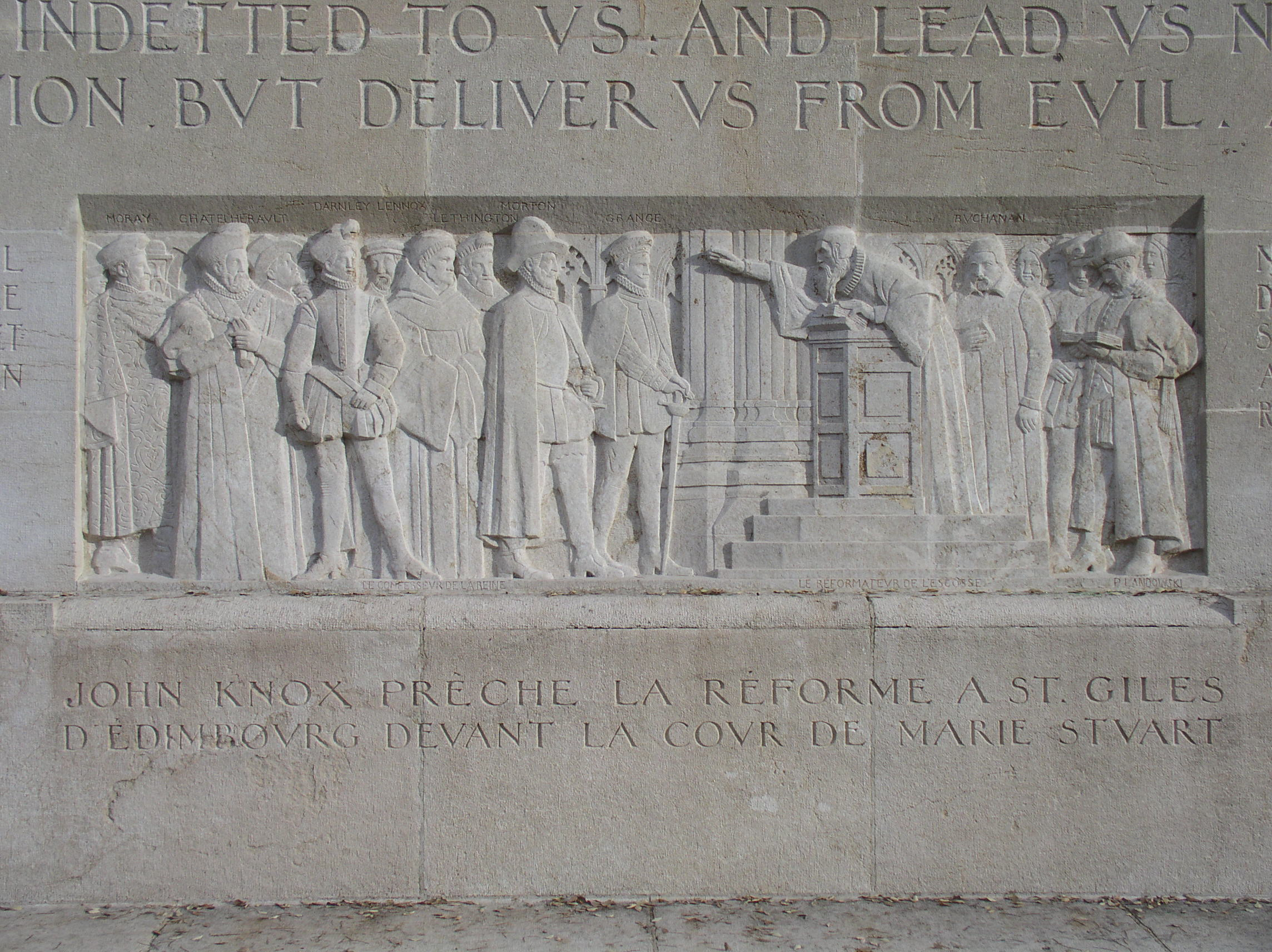
Bas-relief of John Knox preaching at St Giles in Edinburgh before the court of Mary Stuart. From left to right: James Stewart (Moray), James Hamilton (Châtellerault), Lord Darnley, Matthew Stewart (Lennox), William Maitland (Lethington), William Kirkcaldy (Grange), James Douglas (Morton), Knox, and George Buchanan. Located on the Reformers' Wall, Geneva.

On 9 March 1566, Mary's secretary, David Rizzio, was murdered by conspirators loyal to Darnley. Mary escaped from Edinburgh to Dunbar and by 18 March returned with a formidable force. Knox fled to Kyle in Ayrshire, where he completed the major part of his magnum opus, History of the Reformation in Scotland. When he returned to Edinburgh, he found the Protestant nobles divided over what to do with Mary. Lord Darnley had been murdered and the Queen almost immediately married the chief suspect, the Earl of Bothwell. The indictment of murder thus upon her, she was forced to abdicate and was imprisoned in Lochleven Castle. Lord Moray had become the regent of King James VI. Other old friends of Knox, Lord Argyll and William Kirkcaldy, stood by Mary. On 29 July 1567, Knox preached James VI's coronation sermon at the church of the Holy Rude in Stirling. During this period Knox thundered against her in his sermons, even to the point of calling for her death. However, Mary's life was spared, and she escaped on 2 May 1568.

The fighting in Scotland continued as a civil war. Lord Moray was assassinated on 23 January 1570. The regent who succeeded him, the Earl of Lennox, was also a victim of violence. On 30 April 1571, the controller of Edinburgh Castle, Kirkcaldy of Grange, ordered all enemies of the Queen to leave the city. But for Knox, his former friend and fellow galley slave, he made an exception. If Knox did not leave, he could stay in Edinburgh, but only if he remained captive in the castle. Knox chose to leave, and on 5 May he left for St Andrews. He continued to preach, spoke to students, and worked on his History. At the end of July 1572, after a truce was called, he returned to Edinburgh. Although by this time exceedingly feeble and his voice faint, he continued to preach at St Giles'.

After inducting his successor, James Lawson of Aberdeen, as minister of St Giles' on 9 November, Knox returned to his home for the last time. With his friends and some of the greatest Scottish nobles around him, he asked for the Bible to be read aloud. On his last day, 24 November 1572, his young wife read from Paul's first letter to the Corinthians. A testimony to Knox was pronounced at his grave in the churchyard of St Giles' by James Douglas, 4th Earl of Morton, and newly elected regent of Scotland: "Here lies one who never feared any flesh". After the churchyard's destruction in 1633 the precise site of Knox's grave cannot be established.

== Legacy ==
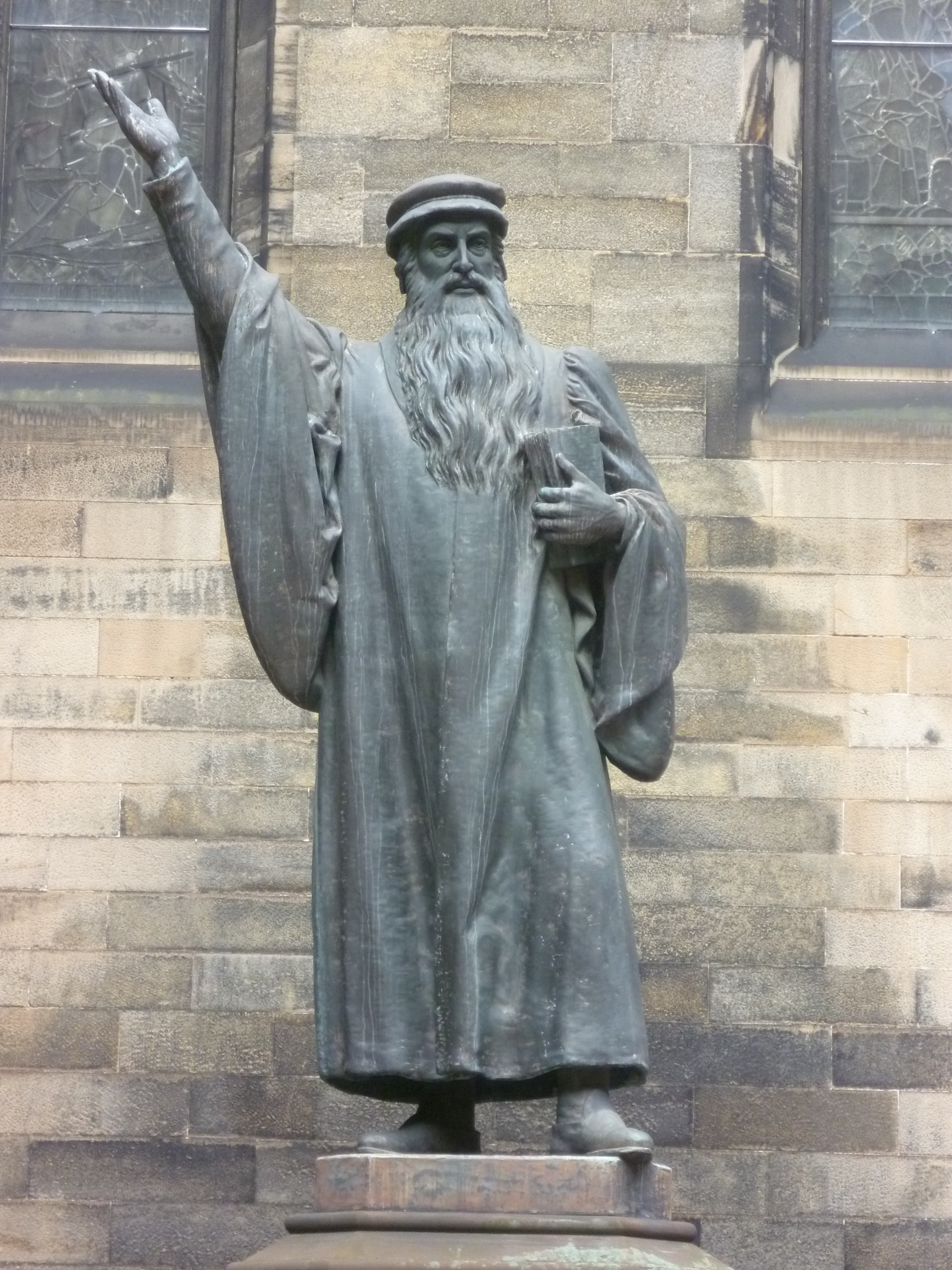
Statue of Knox in New College, Edinburgh, by John Hutchison

In his will, Knox claimed: "None have I corrupted, none have I defrauded; merchandise have I not made." The paltry sum of money Knox bequeathed to his family, which would have left them in dire poverty, showed that he had not profited from his work in the Kirk. The regent, Lord Morton, asked the General Assembly to continue paying his stipend to his widow for one year after his death, and the regent ensured that Knox's dependents were decently supported.

Knox was survived by his five children and his second wife. Nathaniel and Eleazar, his two sons by his first wife, attended St John's College, Cambridge. Nathaniel became a Fellow of St John's but died early in 1580. Eleazar was ordained into the Church of England and served in the parish of Great Clacton. He also died young and was buried in the chapel of St John's College in 1591. Knox's second wife, Margaret Knox, married a second time, to Andrew Ker, who was one of those involved in the murder of David Rizzio. Knox's three daughters also married: Martha to Alexander Fairlie; Margaret to Zachary Pont, son of Robert Pont and brother of Timothy Pont; and Elizabeth to John Welsh, a minister of the Kirk.

Knox's death was barely noticed at the time. Although his funeral was attended by the nobles of Scotland, no major politician or diplomat mentioned his death in their surviving letters. Mary, Queen of Scots, made only two brief references to him in her letters. However, what the rulers feared were Knox's ideas more than Knox himself. He was a successful reformer and it was this philosophy of reformation that had a great impact on the English Puritans. He has also been described as having contributed to the struggle for genuine human freedom, by teaching a duty to oppose unjust government in order to bring about moral and spiritual change. His epitaph reads: "Here lies one who feared God so much that he never feared the face of any man." This is a reference to Matthew 10:28.

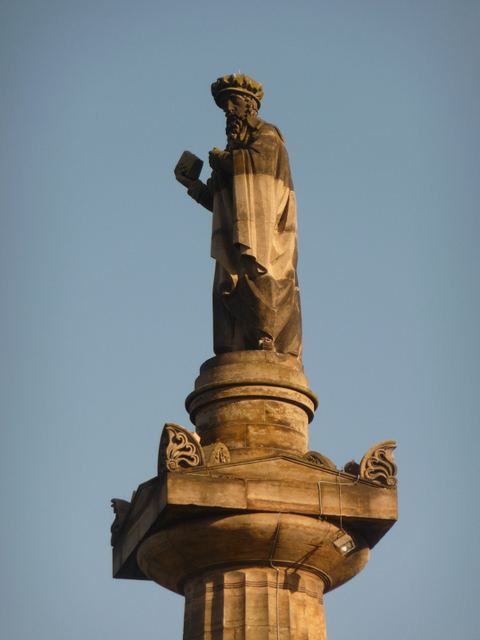
Statue of John Knox sitting atop a column in Glasgow Necropolis, 1825.

Knox was notable not so much for the overthrow of Roman Catholicism in Scotland, but for assuring the replacement of the established Christian religion with Presbyterianism rather than Anglicanism. Knox was instrumental in the establishment of the Presbyterian polity, though it took 120 years following his death for this to be achieved in 1689. Meanwhile, he accepted the status quo and was happy to see his friends appointed bishops and archbishops, even preaching at the inauguration of the Protestant Archbishop of St Andrews John Douglas in 1571. In that regard, Knox is considered the notional founder of the Presbyterian denomination, whose members number millions worldwide.

A bust of Knox, by David Watson Stevenson, is in the Hall of Heroes of the National Wallace Monument in Stirling. Knox is commemorated in multiple notable Church of Scotland and presbyterian locations, such as the Glasgow Necropolis, St Giles cathedral and New College, Edinburgh. He is also commemorated in his hometown of Haddington, where the local grammar school, in which John Knox was educated, was renamed from Haddington Grammar to the John Knox Memorial Institute in 1879 and gradually became known as just Knox Academy after the construction of the new campus between 1930-1960. A large sculpture of Knox adorns the front of the former John Knox Memorial Institute building (now Meadowpark Knox Academy).

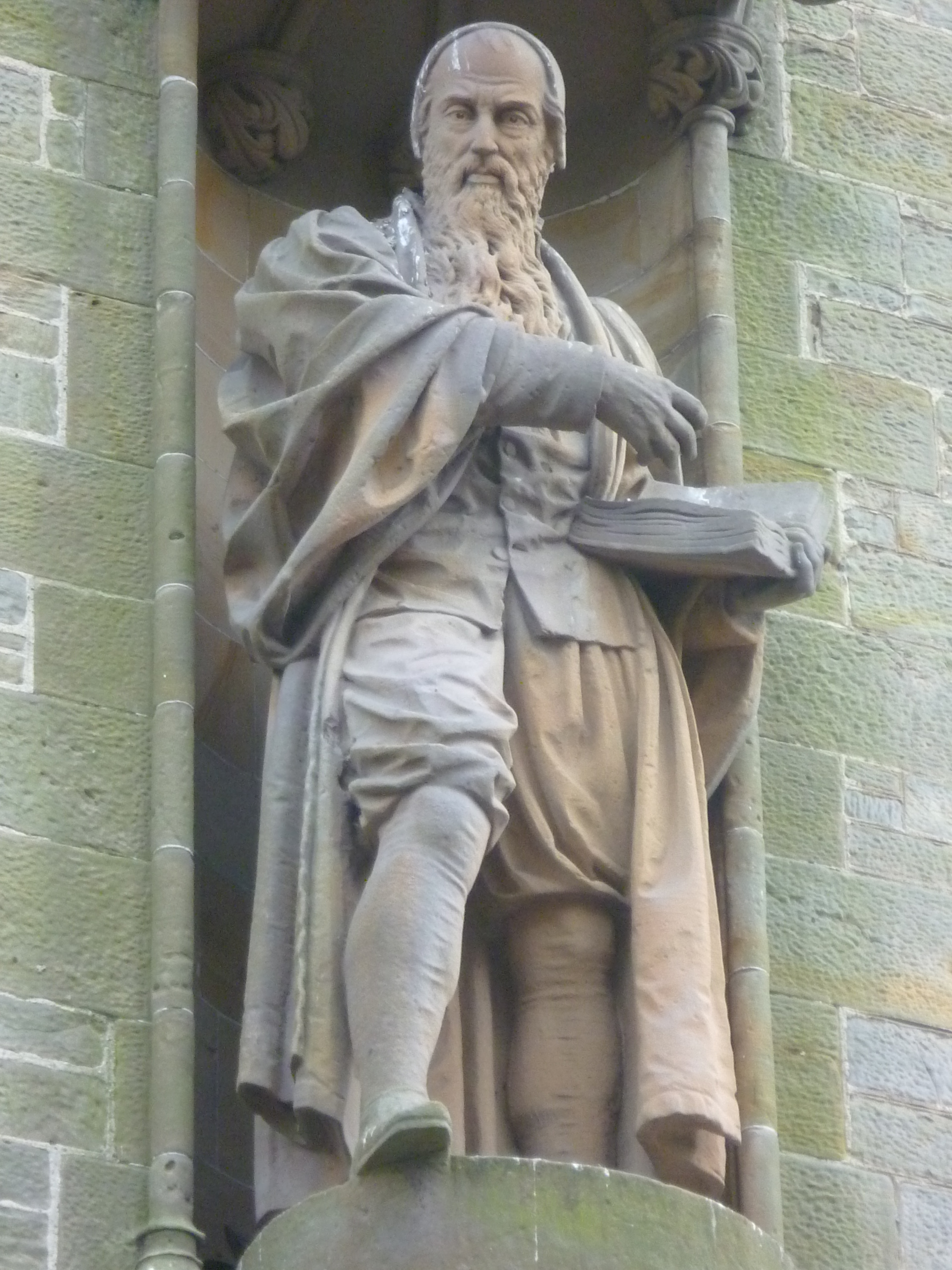
Statue of John Knox adorning the front of Meadowpark Knox Academy (formerly the Knox Memorial Institute)

== Selected works ==
- The Book of Common Order – the University of Edinburgh Heritage Collection holds a copy translated into Scots Gaelic by John Carswell; it is the first book printed in any Gaelic language.
- An Epistle to the Congregation of the Castle of St Andrews; with a Brief Summary of Balnaves on Justification by Faith (1548)
- A Vindication of the Doctrine that the Sacrifice of the Mass is Idolatry (1550)
- A Godly Letter of Warning or Admonition to the Faithful in London, Newcastle, and Berwick (1554)
- Certain Questions Concerning Obedience to Lawful Magistrates with Answers by Henry Bullinger (1554)
- A Faithful Admonition to the Professors of God's Truth in England (1554)
- A Narrative of the Proceedings and Troubles of the English Congregation at Frankfurt on the Maine (1554–1555)
- A Letter to the Queen Dowager, Regent of Scotland (1556)
- A Letter of Wholesome Counsel Addressed to his Brethren in Scotland (1556)
- The Form of Prayers and Ministration of the Sacraments Used in the English Congregation at Geneva (1556)
- The First Blast of the Trumpet Against the Monstruous Regiment of Women (1558)
- A Letter to the Queen Dowager, Regent of Scotland: Augmented and Explained by the Author (1558)
- The Appellation from the Sentence Pronounced by the Bishops and Clergy: Addressed to the Nobility and Estates of Scotland (1558)
- A Letter Addressed to the Commonalty of Scotland (1558)
- On Predestination in Answer to the Cavillations by an Anabaptist (1560)
- The History of the Reformation in Scotland (1586–1587)
