= The History of the Reformation in Scotland =

Book by John Knox

The History of the Reformation in Scotland is a five-volume book written by the Scottish Reformation leader John Knox between 1559 and 1566.

== Knox and his History ==
In 1559 during the Scottish Reformation, the leaders of the Protestant nobility, the Lords of the Congregation, asked Knox to write a history of the movement. This short pamphlet became the second book of the History.

In 1566 Knox continued writing the rest of the History while in Kyle in Ayrshire. By this time he probably had completed drafts of the third book which chronicles the events leading up to the arrival of Mary, Queen of Scots in Scotland. Knox mainly worked on the first and fourth books during this time. The first book covers the period from the beginnings of the Scottish Reformation up to 1559. The fourth book recorded the events from August 1561 to June 1564.

The fifth book first appeared in an edition published by David Buchanan (a relative of the Scottish historian George Buchanan) in 1644. It covers the period from September 1564 to August 1567 when Mary was forced to abdicate the throne. In Buchanan's biography of Knox, he claims that the History is based on Knox's own manuscripts and papers. In a 1732 edition of the History, an unknown editor attributes the fifth book to Buchanan. It is not known who is the author of the fifth book.

== Analysis ==
Knox's History of Reformation has been used as an historical source since its full publication in 1644. However, its own qualities as a text and its ideological context have only been examined in more recent years, starting with Arthur Williamson of New York University's Scottish National Consciousness in the Age of James VI, (1979). Knox was addressing a problem of legitimacy for the new Scottish church compared with age old traditions of the Catholic church. The task was to provide a reassurance that the new community was meaningful and godly. To this Knox brought his evident skills as a preacher and his doctrine of adherence to biblical texts, with application not just to moral situations but in legal contexts and political argument. Working on these lines Knox tends to indicate clearly in his interpretation of past events whether actions were godly or not, thus imposing an intelligible structure on past events. Roger A Mason, of St Andrews University, summarized this aspect of the History of the Reformation, "This kind of thinking, with its strong apocalyptic overtones, is evident on virtually every page of Knox's surviving writings."

Arthur Williamson contrasted Knox's work (apart from Book 1), with John Foxe's Book of Martyrs, wherein with a more abundant supply of historical materials, Foxe was able to create a progressive narrative of the Protestant church in England. Knox choose not to include historical or legendary material about the early church in Scotland. In this omission Roger Mason saw the possibility that Knox took his record of events of the Scottish Reformation, and laid the focus of his History on those events, and on the progress of the new Scottish kirk after the Reformation, producing a critique of recent familiar events which may have helped build community consensus.
