= Fornham Hall =

Former stately home in Suffolk, England

Coordinates: 52.2825°N 0.6966°E

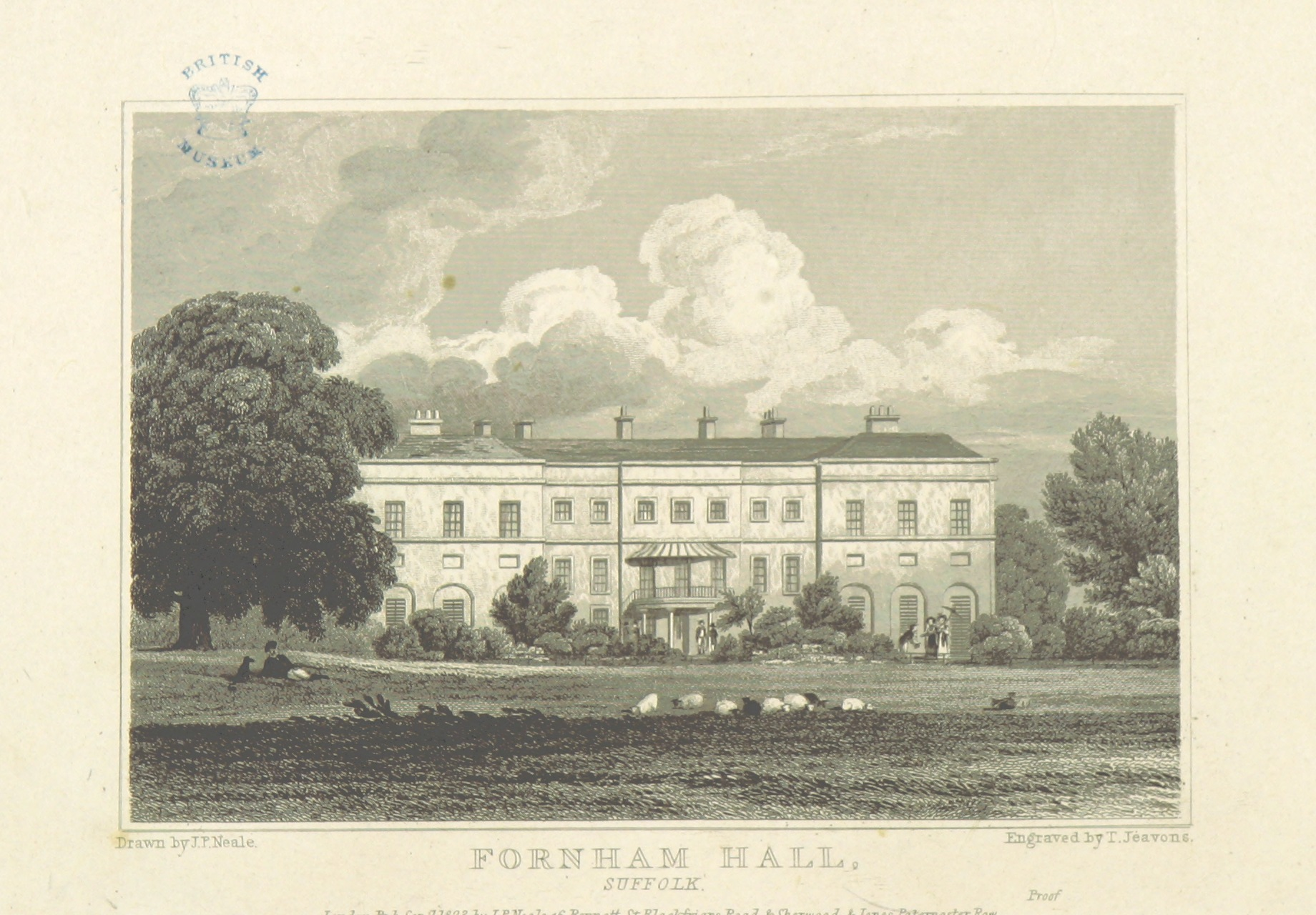
Fornham Hall, Suffolk (1818) by John Preston Neale

Fornham Hall was a large 18th-century country house near Bury St Edmunds. It was demolished in 1957. The Estate included manorial land is part of the parish of Fornham St Genevieve.

== History ==
The Fornham estate was bought in 1731 by Samuel Kent, a rich London grain merchant who became a local MP. Sir Charles Kent, Bt (Samuel's grandson) employed James Wyatt to design a large new house on the estate in the 1770s. He also became a local MP (for Thetford) and was High Sheriff of Suffolk for 1781.

The house was acquired by Bernard Howard (subsequently 12th Duke of Norfolk) in 1797 and expanded on the Duke's behalf by the architect Robert Abraham in the 1820s. It was sold in 1842 to the second Lord Manners who sold it on to Sir William Gilstrap in 1862.

The estate was acquired by the War Office in 1939 and used for training purposes by the Royal Engineers during World War II before the house was demolished in 1957.

The grounds include the tower of the ruined church of St Genevieve.
