= Calvin Auditory =

Chapel in Geneva, Switzerland

Coordinates: 46.2008°N 6.1484°E

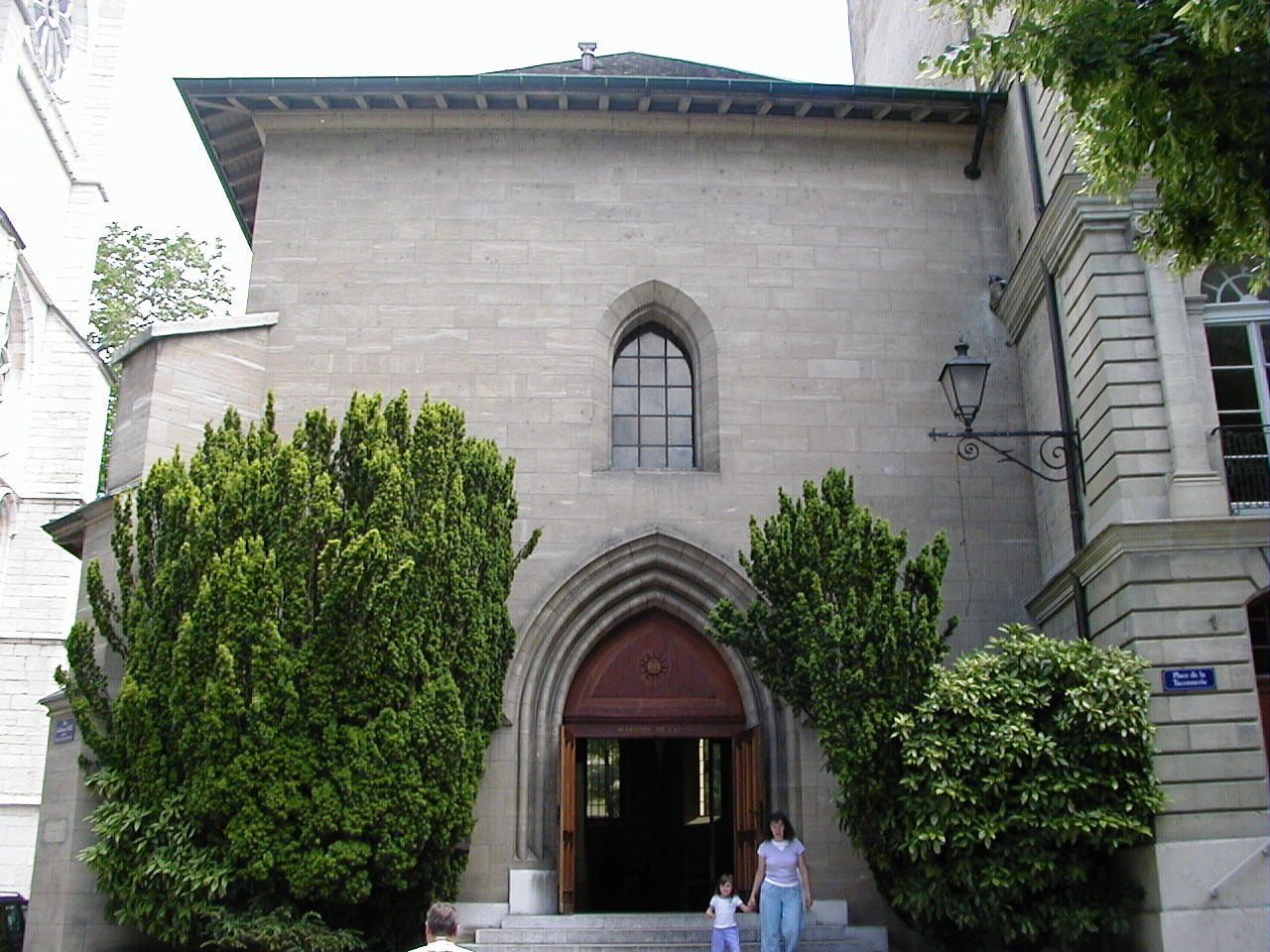
The Calvin Auditory.

The Calvin Auditorium or Calvin Auditory (French: Auditoire de Calvin), originally the Notre-Dame-la-Neuve Chapel, is a chapel in Geneva, Switzerland, which played a significant role in the Protestant Reformation. It is associated with John Calvin, Theodore Beza and John Knox.

The auditorium lies directly adjacent to St. Pierre Cathedral in the Place de la Taconnerie. The austere Gothic-style building was constructed in the 15th century, on the site of earlier 5th-century religious buildings, and was originally dedicated to Notre-Dame-la-Neuve.

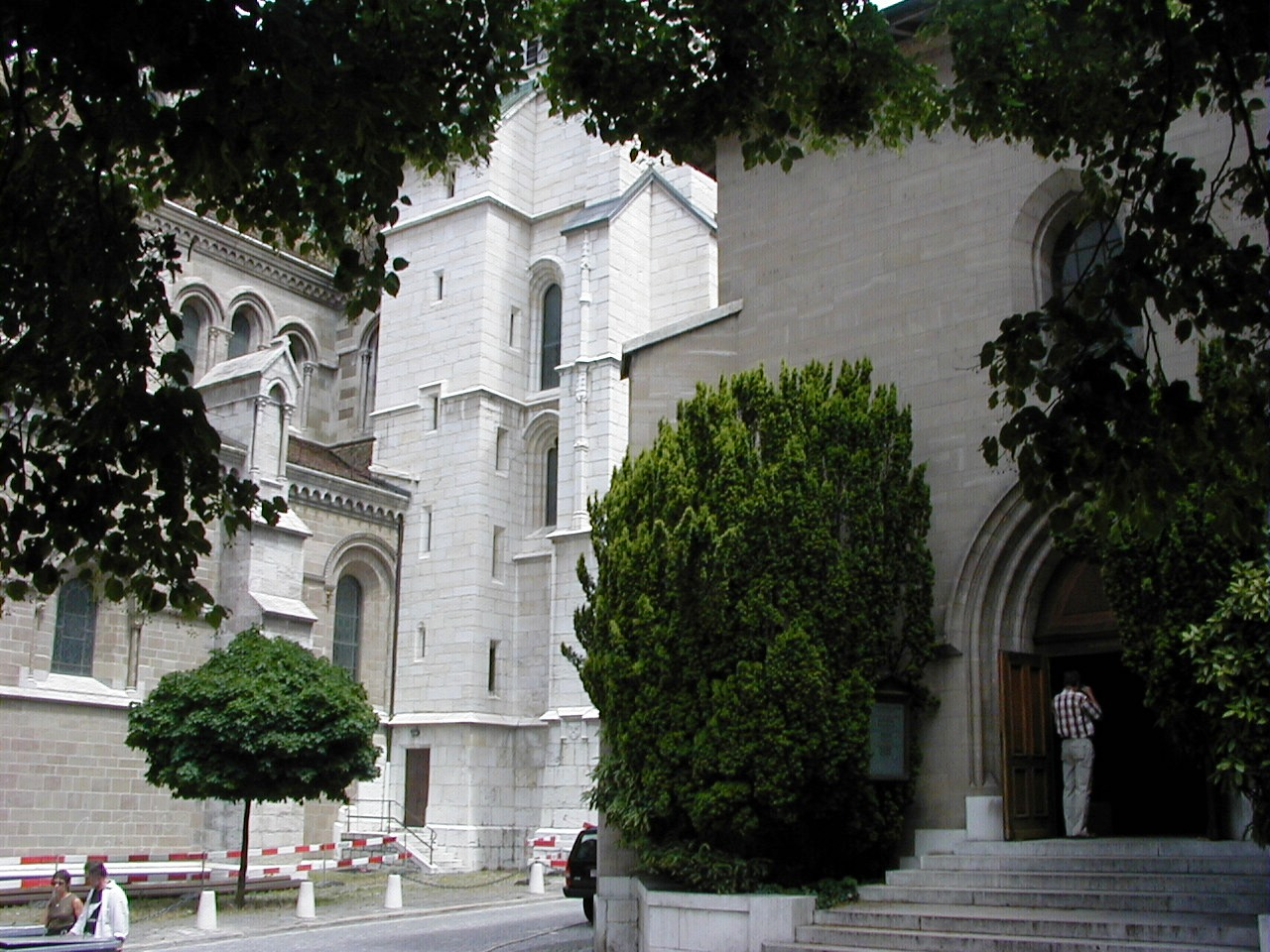
The Auditory in the south shadow of the Cathedral

From 1536, the time of Geneva's Reformation, it became a lecture hall where Calvin actively expounded his reformed theology: Bible studies were conducted here at 7:00 each morning. In 1559, it served as the original home of the University of Geneva. Once Geneva accepted the Reformation, it became a haven for Protestant refugees from all over Europe, and Calvin gave this building over for them to worship in their own language. It was also used by the Scottish reformer John Knox, during his exile in Geneva in the 1550s. Here he ministered to an English-speaking refugee congregation and developed many of the ideas that were to be influential in the Scottish Reformation. Subsequently, it became a place used by numerous Protestant refugee groups including Italian Waldensians, Dutch Reformed and Scottish Presbyterians. It is viewed by many Reformed churches throughout the world as a crucible of their faith. Some of them had great political influence, like the 1559 student of the academy Philips of Marnix, who corresponded after Calvin's death with De Beze. He was influential in drafting the Union of Utrecht, which promoted freedom of conscience in the Netherlands. Effects of the influence of Auditoire visitors is documented in the Reformation Monument. A tour linking the Auditoire to other sites in the old town with great societal significance is available online.

Over the years, the building deteriorated. In 1954, the World Alliance of Reformed Churches reached an agreement with the National Protestant Church of Geneva and launched a programme to restore the auditorium, which was completed in 1959. The effort was led by Rev. Dr. Harrison Ray Anderson, Minister of Fourth Presbyterian Church of Chicago, and former moderator of the Presbyterian Church.

Today, following in the tradition established by Calvin, the Auditoire is still used for worship in languages other than French. It hosts the congregation of the Italian Reformed Church, as well as being used by the Church of Scotland, Geneva - a congregation of the Church of Scotland as its main place of worship every Sunday.

== The Organ ==
In 1963, an organ built by Gruaz, was installed in the Auditoire de Calvin with a two-manual mechanical-action pipe organ.

It was felt during the 500th anniversary of Calvin's birth, celebrated in 2009 that a more versatile organ worthy of the setting could be well used in worship and for a wide range of concerts, and attract organists from the world over to the Auditoire.

A project was started by the Association for a New Organ in the Auditoire de Calvin to select and raise funds for a new instrument. After an intensive search, a representative group from the congregations using the Auditoire, advised by François Delor, official organist of the Cathedral of St Pierre in Geneva, selected Bernard Aubertin, a renowned French organ-builder, to build the new organ. Funds were raised through concerts, generous individual donations and support from the Hans Wilsdorf Foundation and the Loterie Romande. The new organ was installed in April 2014 and was celebrated and shared with the public through a concert festival that is now repeated annually and a dedication concert in the months following the installation.
