= Francis Vernon, 1st Earl of Shipbrook =

English-born Irish peer (1715–1783)

Francis Vernon

Member of Parliament for Ipswich
- In office 1762–1765 Serving with Thomas Staunton

Personal details
- Born: 1715
- Died: 15 October 1783 (aged 67–68)
- Spouse: Alice Ibbetson
- Children: 1
- Parent: James Vernon (father)
- Relatives: James Vernon (grandfather); Charles Boyle (grandfather)
- Military career
- Allegiance: Great Britain
- Rank: Colonel
- Commands: 2nd or East Suffolk Battalion

Francis Vernon, 1st Earl of Shipbrook (1715 – 15 October 1783), known as The Lord Orwell between 1762 and 1776 and as The Viscount Orwell between 1776 and 1777, was an English politician.

== Biography ==
Vernon was the son of James Vernon by his wife Arethusa, daughter of Charles Boyle, Lord Clifford.

When the militia was reconstituted under threat of French invasion during the Seven Years' War, Vernon was appointed Colonel of the 2nd or East Suffolk Battalion on 27 April 1759. In June 1762, under his personal command, the regiment attended a training camp at Sandheath, near Ripley. With the Seven Years War drawing to a close, he was instructed on 20 December 1762 to disembody the regiment. He had been succeeded in the command by William Wollaston by the time the regiment was next embodied, in 1778.

Vernon sat as Member of Parliament for Ipswich from 1761 to 1768. In 1762 he was raised to the Peerage of Ireland as Baron Orwell, of Newry in the County of Down. He was further honoured when he was made Viscount Orwell in 1776 and in 1777 Earl of Shipbrooke "of Newry in the County of Down", also in the Irish peerage. Shipbrook Castle in Cheshire was the earliest recorded seat of the Vernon family.

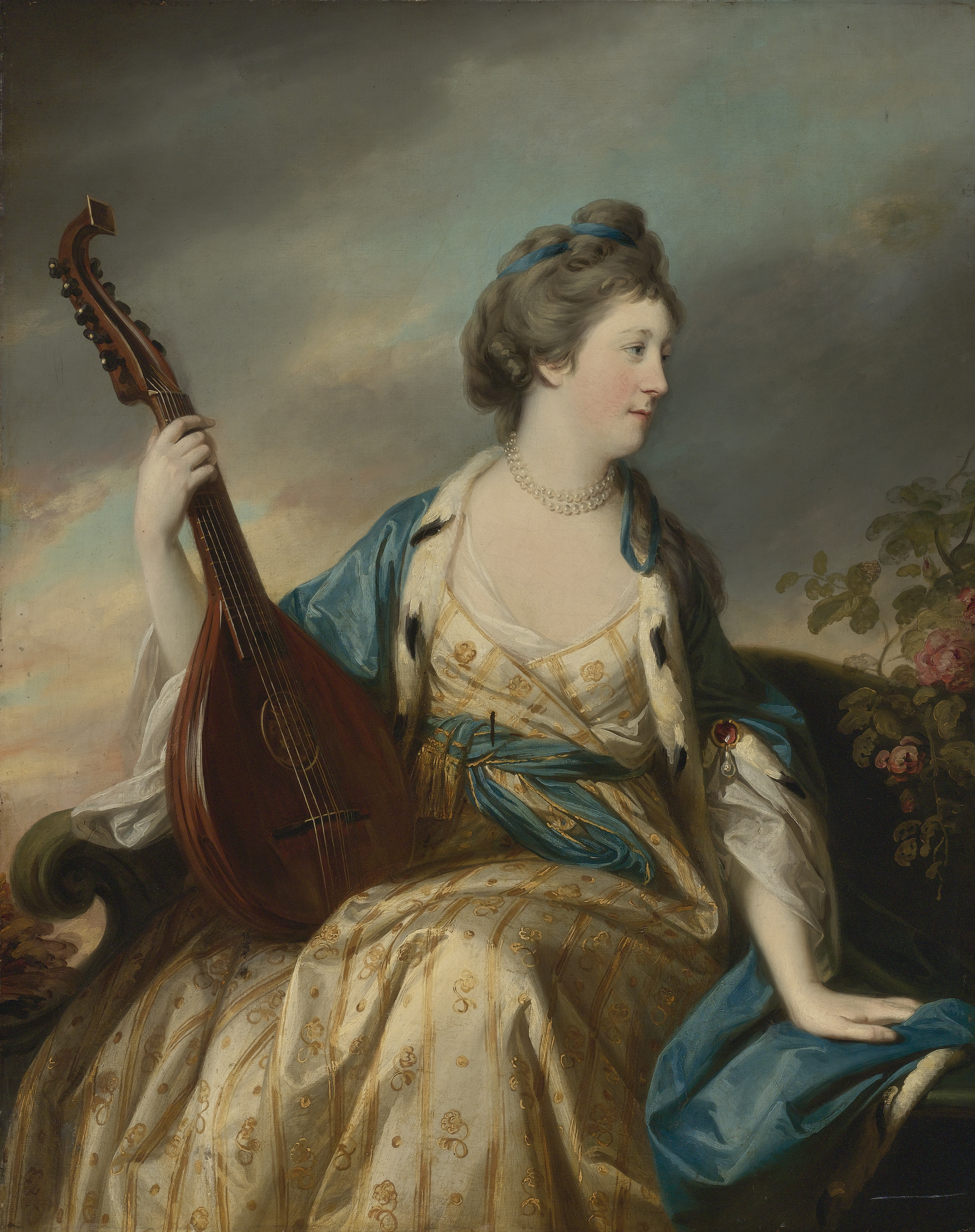
Alice, Countess of Shipbrook. (Francis Cotes)

He married Alice, daughter of Samuel Ibbetson of Denton Hall, Wharfedale, Yorkshire. Their son, Francis (1752–1760) died early.

Lord Shipbrooke died in October 1783 when all the titles became extinct.

Parliament of Great Britain
Preceded by George Montgomerie; Thomas Staunton	Member of Parliament for Ipswich; 1762–1765; With: Thomas Staunton	Succeeded by William Wollaston; Thomas Staunton
Peerage of Ireland
New creation	Earl of Shipbrook; 1777–1783	Extinct
New creation	Viscount Orwell; 1776–1783	Extinct
New creation	Baron Orwell; 1762–1783	Extinct
