= Ipswich Blue Party =

Ipswitch political group

The Blues in Ipswich were a grouping of supporters who generally favoured the Tory Party, and later the Conservatives, within the Ipswich Corporation and constituency. They tended to be opposed to the Yellows who were in favour of the Whigs, and later Liberals. Due to the unusual level of organisation within the constituency and the alignment with national political parties Ipswich rarely elected split ticket or independent candidates.
