= Ipswich Corporation =

Local authority

History
- Founded: 1200 ancient borough 1836 municipal borough 1889 county borough
- Disbanded: 1974
- Succeeded by: Ipswich Borough Council

Ipswich Corporation was the local authority which ran the town of Ipswich in Suffolk, England. It was founded in 1200 and abolished in 1974, being replaced by Ipswich Borough Council. The corporation's formal name until 1835 was the "bailiffs, burgesses and commonalty of the town or borough of Ipswich", and after 1836 was the "mayor, aldermen and burgesses of the borough of Ipswich", but it was generally known as the corporation or town council.

From its foundation in 1200, the corporation kept often highly detailed accounts of its operation. A great deal of these survive to this day. After a successful period of four centuries, surviving plague and many other challenges governance of the borough descended into chaos after the restoration in 1660. This lasted until new structures were imposed in 1836 under the Municipal Corporations Act 1835 which created the municipal borough of Ipswich. Since the Local Government Act 1972 Ipswich has been a non-metropolitan district with borough status.

== History ==
=== Early years ===
King John granted a royal charter to the town in 1200. Unusually, they immediately resolved to record proceedings in Domesday Book of Ipswich. The original documents were stolen in 1272. Its contents were however already noted and a new copy was made later. In 1290 'The Little domesday book of Ipswich' was compiled based on what could be recollected at the time. A further copy was made in the 14th century.

During the 16th to 18th centuries the governance consisted of:

- 12 Portmen, sometimes referred to as "the twelve", who were self replacing and elected for life.
- 2 Bailiffs elected annually from the ranks of the portmen by the Great Court, they shared the roles of mayor and chief magistrate supported by four other justices
- 24 Common councilmen from whose ranks the town treasurer, clavigers and coroners and other officers were elected.

The Portmen and Common Councilmen met as the assembly to discuss town issues, with formal decisions decided by the Great Court which also included a large number of free burgesses empowered to vote on all matters concerning the corporation, especially the election of officers. This also included two burgesses to sit as members of parliament for Ipswich.

In 1611 the corporation 'adventured' £100 towards the cost of ships to sail to Jamestown, in Virginia 13 years before the Mayflower.

Following the restoration in 1660 the governance of the corporation declined until the Municipal Corporations Act 1835 again brought order. The borough was both subject to disastrous manipulation by Charles II and James II and also by the rise of party politics. The town was strongly puritan and during the winter of 1662/63 royal commissioners arrived to enforce the Corporation Act 1661 and ask all officeholders and freeman to renounce the 'Puritan Covenant'. Half of the assembly were purged. In 1684 the charter was then called in and replaced by another which named to new officeholders and for the first time in its history Portmen were imposed on the town many of whom were outsiders, freemen were refused participation in the borough government. The aim was to create a compliant, closed corporation. Control over the Holy Rood Fair which took place on St Margaret's Green was passed to the corporation. A further charter was imposed by James II in 1688 without revoking the earlier charter and the result was confusion and chaos and permanent problems in 1835.

In 1719 the corporation blocked proposals to make the River Orwell navigable as far as Stowmarket; further plans were raised in 1790 and the work was completed by 1793 after which numerous maltings were soon operating in Stowmarket.

Until the Reform Act 1832 members of parliament for Ipswich were selected for the Ipswich Parliament constituency by the Ipswich Corporation. Elections during the 18th century in the town sometimes descended into physical fights between 'The Blues' (who supported the conservatives) and 'The Yellows' (who supported the Whigs or Liberals) with the behaviour of the politicians being described as 'miserable' and local and national elections often ending in a competition of who could be bribed and for what price. Following the Reform Act 1832 all male householders living in properties worth at least ten pounds a year were given the right to vote and process of voter registration. The act was intended to "take effectual Measures for correcting diverse Abuses that have long prevailed in the Choice of Members to serve in the Commons House of Parliament."

==== Office holders ====
During the celebrations held in 2000 to mark the 800th anniversary of the reception of King John's charter by the burgesses, many details were published with information gleaned from the corporation's archives. The editors remarked that the details concerning principal financial officers, the town treasurer and chamberlains during the Elizabethan and Stuart periods constitute a particularly rich source of material for the social history of the town.

===== Town Treasurer =====
Many prominent people have fulfilled the role of Ipswich Town Treasurer:

- Peter Fisher: 1639 - 1644
- Benjamin Brame senior: 1806 -1808
- Benjamin Brame junior: 1809 - 1829

=== Ipswich Municipal Borough, 1836 – 1889 ===
The Municipal Corporations Act 1835 reformed and standardised local government in many towns across the country, including Ipswich, which consequently became a municipal borough on 1 January 1836. This followed an investigation into municipal corporations which had concluded that the existing Municipal Corporations of England and Wales neither possess nor deserve the confidence or respect of Your Majesty's subjects. The old corporation, which had formally been called the "bailiff, burgesses and commonalty of the town or borough of Ipswich", was replaced with a new body called the "mayor, aldermen and burgesses of the borough of Ipswich". Subsequent to the 1835 act a mayor was elected, together with a High Steward, Recorder, ten Aldermen and thirty councillors.

Between 1835 and 1842 there were five parliamentary elections and all were found to have been corrupt and in all seven members of parliament were unseated. In 1841 votes were openly for sale at £15.

W.C. Fonnereau leased 13 acres (53,000 m^{2}) of Christchurch Park to the corporation in 1851.

The Municipal Corporations Act 1882 gave powers to the corporation to make byelaws and to acquire land and buildings.

=== County Borough of Ipswich 1888-1974 ===
Following the Local Government Act 1888 the county of Suffolk was split into East Suffolk and West Suffolk for administrative purposes and the term administrative county was introduced. Ipswich was retained its independence as the County Borough of Ipswich.

In 1895 Felix Cobbold gave Christchurch Mansion to the town on condition that the corporation buys the rest of the property who completed the purchase later in the year.

Ipswich Corporation (Tramways, &c) Act 1900
- Act of Parliament
- Parliament of the United Kingdom
- Long title: An Act to authorise the Mayor Aldermen and Burgesses of the Borough of Ipswich to construct tramways and street improvements and for other purposes.
- Citation: 63 & 64 Vict. c. ccxviii

Dates
- Royal assent: 6 August 1900

In 1901 the corporation purchased the town's tram system from the Ipswich Tramway Company as authorised by the Ipswich Corporation (Tramways, &c) Act 1900 (63 & 64 Vict. c. ccxviii).

In 1903, the corporation purchased one of six packages of land which was formerly part of the Hill House Estate and home of the Byles family and created Alexandra Park, named after the wife of Edward VII.

In 1927 the land where Chantry Park is now situated had been sold for housing development and was then purchased by Sir Arthur Churchman (later Lord Woodbridge) who then gave it to Ipswich Corporation to be held in permanent trust for the people of Ipswich.

In 1929 the corporation purchased 147 acres (59 ha) of land to create a municipal airport for Ipswich. Ipswich Airport was constructed the following year and was then officially opened by H.R.H. Prince Edward on 26 June 1930 who described the facility as "one of the finest in the country".

In 1973 Anglian Water Authority was formed by the Water Act 1973 and took over various services run by the corporation.

The county borough of Ipswich was abolished in 1974 following the Local Government Act 1972 and Ipswich became a non-metropolitan district with borough status.

== Acts of parliament ==
The following acts of parliament relate to, or mention the Ipswich Corporation:-

- Ipswich Corporation (Tramways &) Act, 1900 authorisation to construct Tramways and other street improvements
- Ipswich Corporation Act 1948
- Ipswich Corporation (Trolley Vehicles) Order Confirmation Act 1931
- Ipswich Corporation (Trolley Vehicles) Order Confirmation Act 1935
- Ipswich Corporation (Trolley Vehicles) Order Confirmation Act 1938
- Ipswich Corporation Act 1911
- Ipswich Corporation Act 1925
- IPSWICH CORPORATION (TROLLEY VEHICLES) PROVISIONAL ORDER BILL (in 1946)
- Telecommunications Act 1984
- The Communications Act 2003 (Consequential Amendments) Order 2003 (No. 2155)
