= Notary (Catholic canon law) =

Catholic Church canon law appointed person

In the canon law of the Catholic Church, a notary (Latin: notarius) is a person appointed by competent authority to draw up official or authentic documents. These documents are issued chiefly from the official administrative bureaux, the chanceries; secondly, from tribunals; lastly, others are drawn up at the request of individuals to authenticate their contracts or other acts. The public officials appointed to draw up these three classes of papers have been usually called notaries.

== Etymology ==
Etymologically, a notary is one who takes notes. Notes are signs or cursory abbreviations to record the words uttered, so that they may be reproduced later in ordinary writing. Notaries were at first private secretaries, attached to the service of persons in positions of importance. It was natural for the science of notes to be in high esteem among those employed in recording the transactions of public boards, and for the name notary to be applied to these officials; so that before long the word was used to signify their occupation.

== History ==
The title and office existed at the Imperial Court (cf. Cod. Theod., VI, 16, "De primicerio et notariis"), whence they passed into all the royal chanceries, though in the course of time the term notary ceased to be used. This was the case also with the chanceries of the pope, the great episcopal sees, and even every bishopric.

There are grounds for doubting whether the seven regional notaries of the Roman Church, one for each ecclesiastical district of the Holy City, were instituted by St. Clement and appointed by him to record the Acts of the martyrs, as is said in the Liber Pontificalis; they date back, however, to an early age.

== Primicerius and secundicerius ==
Not only were there notaries as soon as a bureau for ecclesiastical documents was established, the notaries formed a kind of college presided over by a primicerius; the notice of Pope Julius I in the Liber Pontificalis relates that this pope ordered an account of the property of the Church, intended as an authentic document, to be drawn up before the primicerius of the notaries.

The notaries were in the ranks of the clergy and must have received one of the minor orders, for the notariate is an office and not an order. At intervals the popes entrusted the notaries of their curia with various missions. Their chief, the primicerius, with whom a secundicerius is sometimes found later, was a very important personage, in fact, the head of the pontifical chancery; during the vacancy of the papal chair, he formed part of the interim Government, and a letter in 640 (Jaffé, "Regesta", n. 2040) is signed (the pope being elected but not yet consecrated) by one "Joannes primicerius et servans locum s. sedis apostolicae".

== Protonotary Apostolic ==
There were of course many notaries in the service of the pontifical chancery; the seven regional notaries preserved a certain pre-eminence over the others and became the protonotary (also spelled "prothonotaries"), whose name and office continued. The ordinary notaries of the chancery, however, were gradually known by other names, according to their various functions, so that the term ceased to be employed in the pontifical and other chanceries. The prothonotaries were and still are a college of prelates, enjoying numerous privileges; they are known as "participants", but outside of Rome there are many purely honorary prothonotaries. The official duties had insensibly almost ceased; but Pius X in his reorganization of the Roman Curia appointed participant prothonotaries to the chancery (Const. "Sapienti", 29 June 1908). A corresponding change occurred in the bureaux of the episcopal churches, abbeys, etc.; the officials attached to the chancery have ceased to be known as notaries and are called chancellor, secretary, etc. Lastly, mention must be made of the notaries of the synodal or conciliar assemblies, whose duties are limited to the duration of the assembly.

== Notaries of canonical tribunals ==
Originally, the same prelates held judicial and administrative authority. Later a separation of powers was instituted, and contentious matters were tried separately before a specially appointed body. This body required a notary (or "actuary") to keep records, serving the same function as a clerk of the court in civil law.

The special law of the higher ecclesiastical tribunals, the Tribunal of the Roman Rota and the Supreme Tribunal of the Apostolic Signatura, reorganized by Pius X, provides for the appointment of notaries for these two tribunals. Canon law allows a layperson to act as notary, except in criminal cases against a cleric, but the office is usually held by a cleric.

The head official charged with drawing up the documents of the Holy Office is also called a notary, as were the clerks who in former times drew up the records of the Inquisition.

== Public notaries ==
Finally, there is the class of persons to whom the term notary is restricted in common parlance, to wit, those who are appointed by the proper authorities to witness the documentary proceedings between private persons and to impress them with legal authenticity. They are not engaged in the chanceries, in order that they may be within easy reach of private individuals; they have a public character, so that their records, drawn up according to rule, are received as authentic accounts of the particular transaction, especially agreements, contracts, testaments, and wills.

Consequently, public notaries may be appointed only by those authorities who possess jurisdiction in foro externo, and have a chancery, e.g. popes, bishops, emperors, reigning princes, and of course only within the limits of their jurisdiction; moreover, the territory within which a notary can lawfully exercise his functions is expressly determined. There were formerly Apostolic notaries and even episcopal notaries, duly commissioned by papal or episcopal letters, whose duty it was to receive documents relating to ecclesiastical or mixed affairs, especially in connection with benefices, foundations, and donations in favor of churches, wills of clerics, etc. They no longer exist; the only ecclesiastical notaries at present are the officials of the Roman and episcopal curiae. Moreover, these notaries were layman, and canon law forbids clerics to acts as scriveners.
