= Alexandra Park, Ipswich =

Park in Ipswich, Suffolk, England

Coordinates: 52.05356°N 1.16798°E

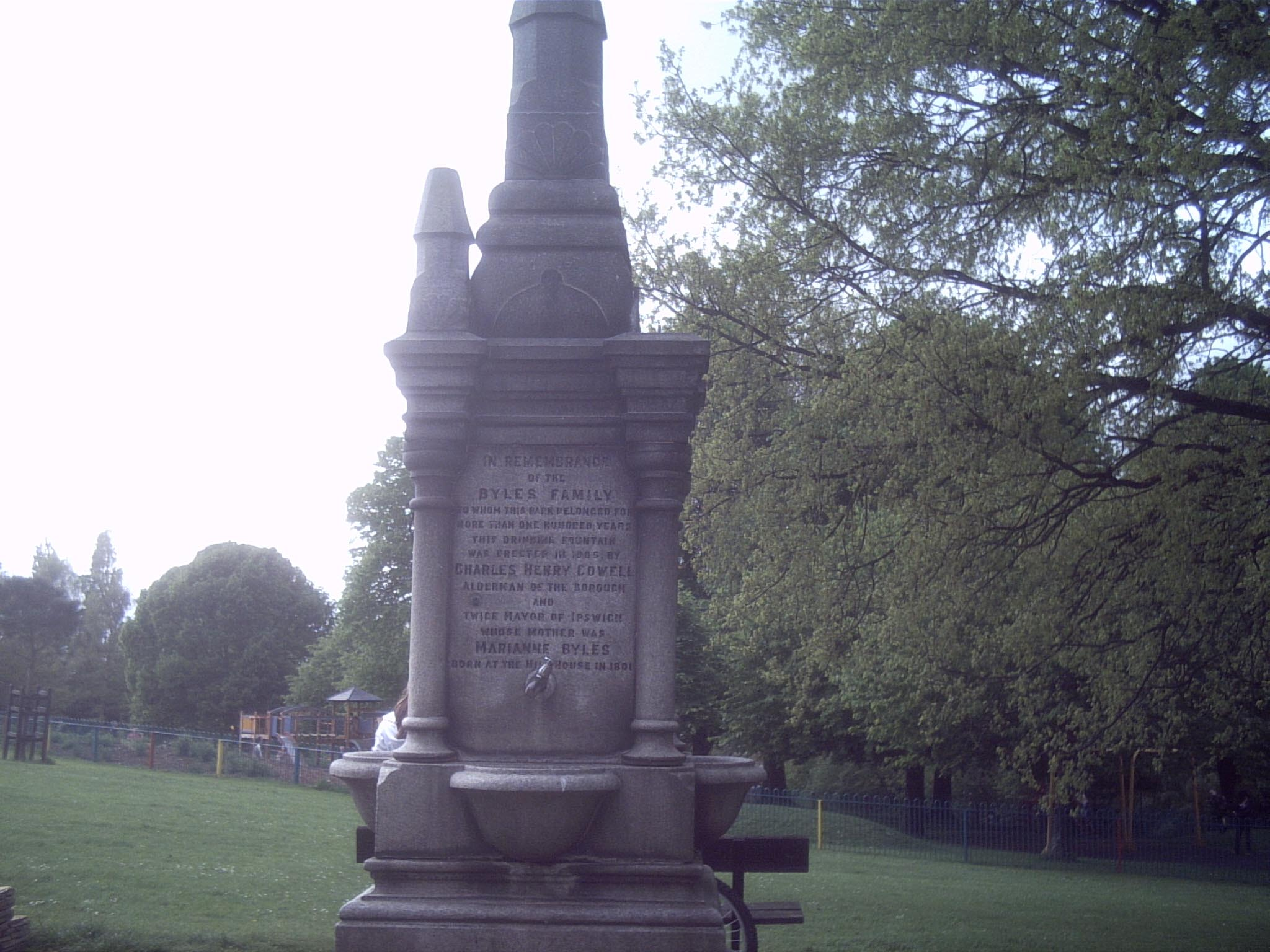
The Byles Memorial Fountain.

Alexandra Park is situated between Grove Lane, Kings Avenue and Back Hamlet, Ipswich.

== History ==
In 1903, the Ipswich Corporation purchased one of six packages of land which was formerly part of the Hill House Estate and home of the Byles family. The land became parkland and was named Alexandra Park after the wife of Edward VII.

In June 1904, the park was officially opened to the public.

== Features ==
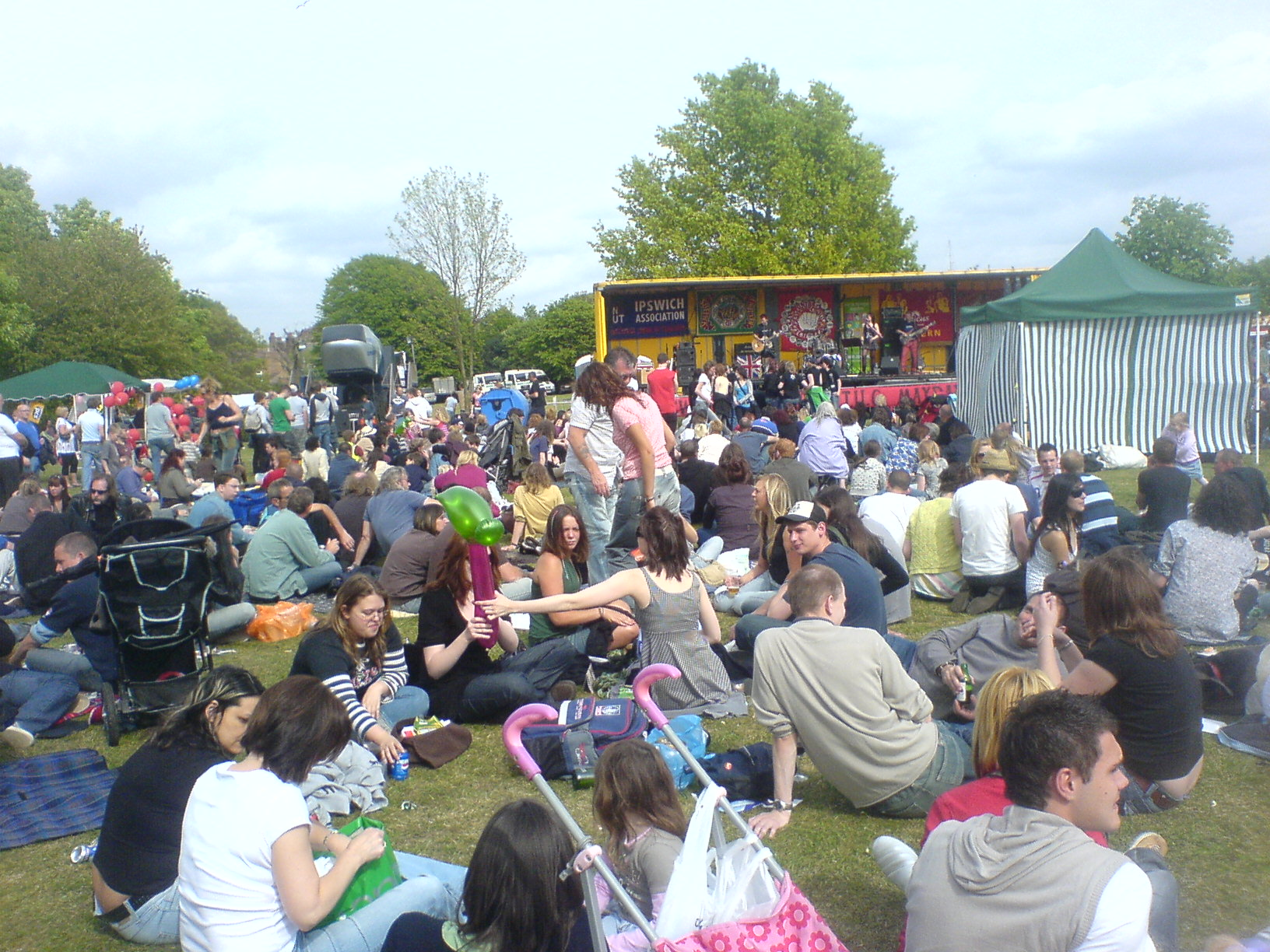
The May Day festival, 2007.

The park is mainly gently sloped grass area. It includes a children's play area and public toilets.

It also is host to the May Day Festival in Ipswich, held usually on the closest Sunday to May 1.

The park has a natural slope from Grove Lane down to Kings Avenue. This permits views of the surrounding areas, including the Orwell Bridge, the docks area and many of the town's ancient churches such as St Mary le Tower and its prominent spire.

=== Memorial Fountain ===
The fountain was presented to the town by Alderman Charles Henry Cowell as a memorial to his mother, Marianne Byles Cowell.
