= John Staunton =

Irish politician, lawyer and Crown official

John Staunton (1666-1731) was an Irish politician, lawyer and Crown official. He was the father of Thomas Staunton, an English Parliamentarian of some fame.

He was born in Galway, the eldest son of Thomas Staunton, Mayor of Galway, and Deborah Morgan, daughter of Captain John Morgan of Kilcolgan Castle, County Galway. He was called to the Bar and became Queen's Counsel. He was appointed Third Serjeant-at-law (Ireland) in 1712 but was dismissed, on party political grounds, two years later. However, his political views did not prevent him from being appointed a Master in Chancery in 1725.

He was elected to the Irish House of Commons as MP for Galway Town in 1703 and held the seat, with short intervals, until his appointment as Master in Chancery. His younger brother Thomas was also an Irish MP.

He married Bridget Donnellan, daughter of Edmund Donnellan of Ballydonnellan, and had at least two children, Anna, who married Barnaby Gunning of Holywell, County Roscommon, by whom she had one daughter Bridget, and Thomas (c.1706-1784). Thomas followed his father to the Bar and to the Irish House of Commons, but moved to England, where he sat in the British House of Commons for many years, and had some reputation there as an orator.

== Sources ==
- Hart, A.R. History of the King's Serjeants at law in Ireland Dublin Four Courts Press 2000
- Montgomery-Massingberd, Hugh Burke's Irish Family Records London 1976
