= Samuel Kent (MP) =

Samuel Kent (c. 1683 – 8 October 1759) was an MP for Ipswich in the 8th, 9th, and 10th Parliament of Great Britain, sitting from 23 January 1735 to his death in 1759.

He was a younger son of Thomas Kent of Christchurch, Southwark, a Norway merchant.

He was appointed High Sheriff of Surrey for 1729–30. In 1731 he acquired the Fornham Hall estate at Fornham St. Genevieve, near Bury St Edmunds, Suffolk. He served as "Distiller to the Court" in 1739. As an MP he reliably voted with the Whig court of George II.

He died in 1759. He had married Sarah, the daughter of Richard Dean, skinner, of London, and had two sons and a daughter, Sarah, who married Charles Egleton father of Sir Charles Kent, 1st Baronet. His estate passed in turn to a son and then his daughter Sarah and her husband.

Parliament of Great Britain
Preceded by Philip Broke; William Wollaston	Member of Parliament for Ipswich; 1734–1759; With: William Wollaston to 1741; Edward Vernon 1741–57; Thomas Staunton from 1757	Succeeded by George Montgomerie; Thomas Staunton
