= Ipswich Yellow Party =

Whig political party in Ipswich

The Ipswich Yellow Party was a whig party which played a major role in the politics of Ipswich, Suffolk during the eighteenth century and early nineteenth century. They were opposed by the Ipswich Blue Party, which was generally aligned with the Tory Party, although alignment of the local parties with the national parties was eroded as the eighteenth century wore on.
