= George Sampson (disambiguation) =

George Sampson (born 1993) is an English street dancer, television presenter, singer, and actor.

George Sampson may also refer to:

- George Green Sampson (1804–1885), English physician and politician
- George Sampson (cricketer) (1845–1911), New Zealand cricketer
- George Sampson (scholar) (1873–1950), English literary scholar

== See also ==
- George Simpson (disambiguation)
