= Ipswich Docks =

Docks in the Port of Ipswich, Suffolk, England

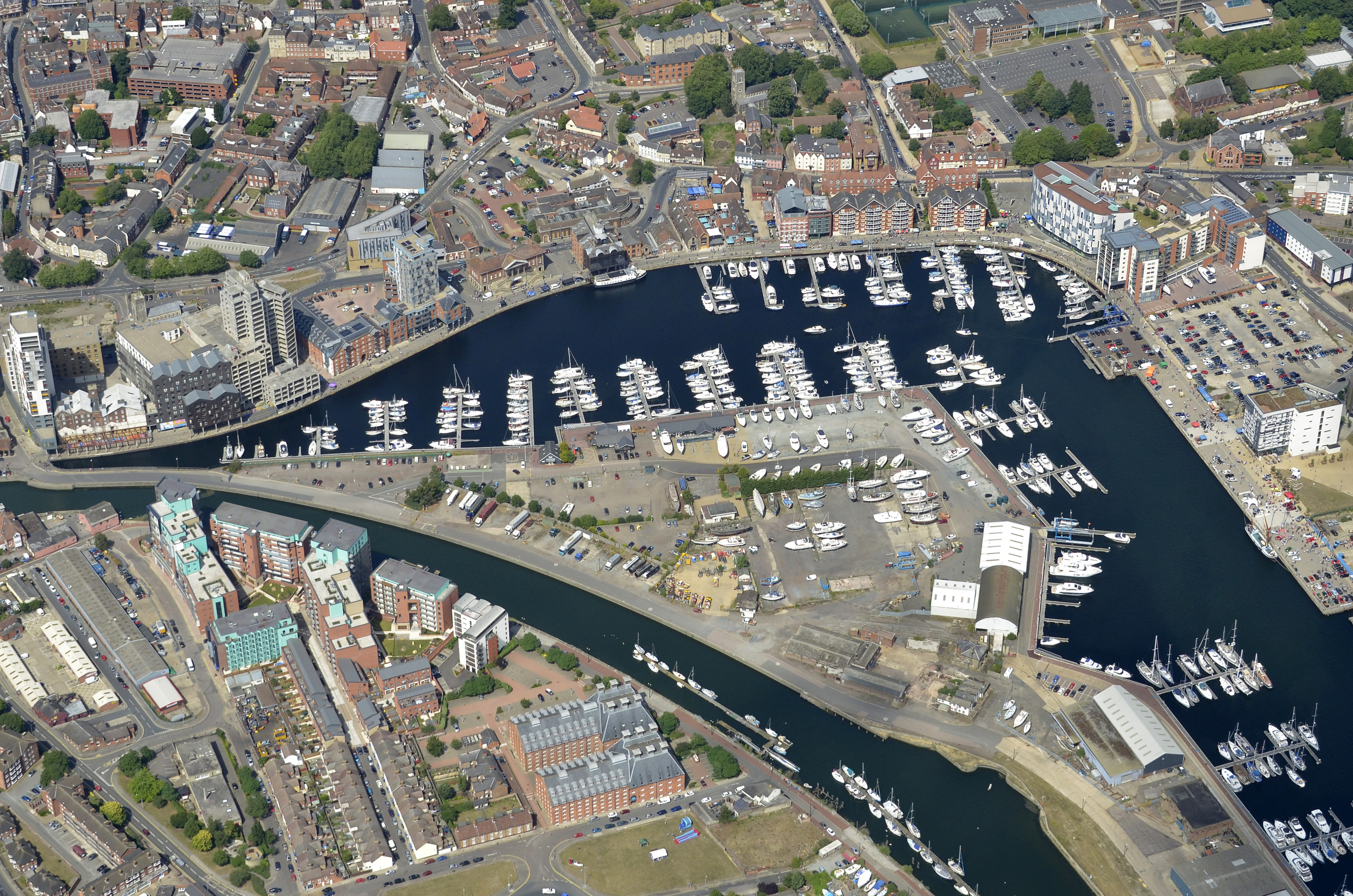
Aerial view

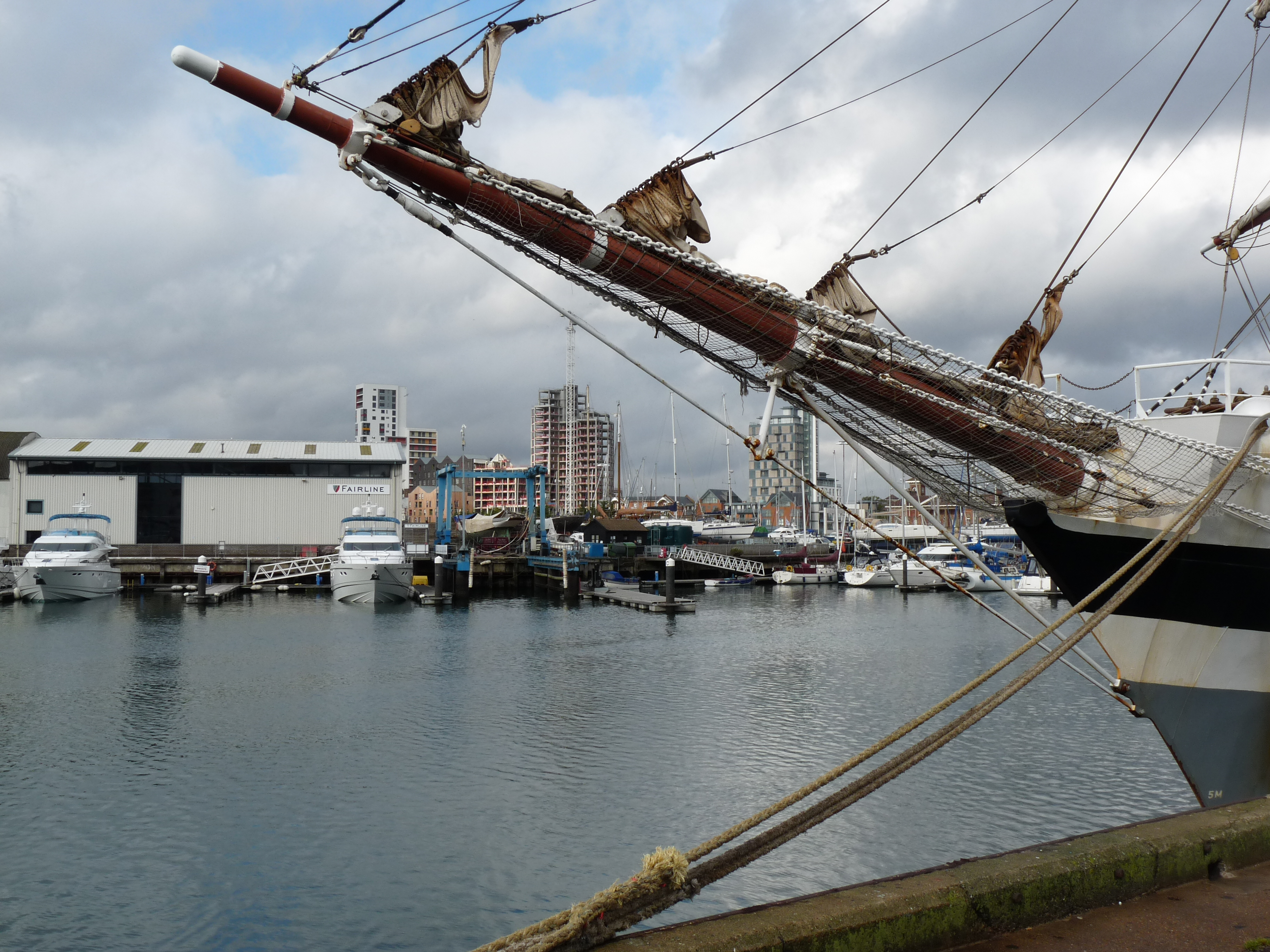
Stavros S Niarchos in Ipswich dock (2009) - Fairline Yachts and waterfront in the background

The Ipswich Docks, Ipswich wet dock, and the wet dock are a series of docks in the Port of Ipswich located at a bend of the River Orwell, which has been used for trade since at least the 8th Century. A wet dock was constructed in 1842, which was 'the biggest enclosed dock in the United Kingdom' at the time. A major regeneration of the area has taken place since 1999.

== History ==
=== Economic stagnation ===
Although Ipswich had enjoyed "a great trade" in the sixteenth century, by the seventeenth century this went into decline. This in turn had led to the neglect of basic facilities, such as the Common Quay, which was no longer accessible by vessels with a draft of 8 feet or more; such vessels had to transfer their cargoes into lighters three miles downstream at Downham Reach.

=== Initial work ===
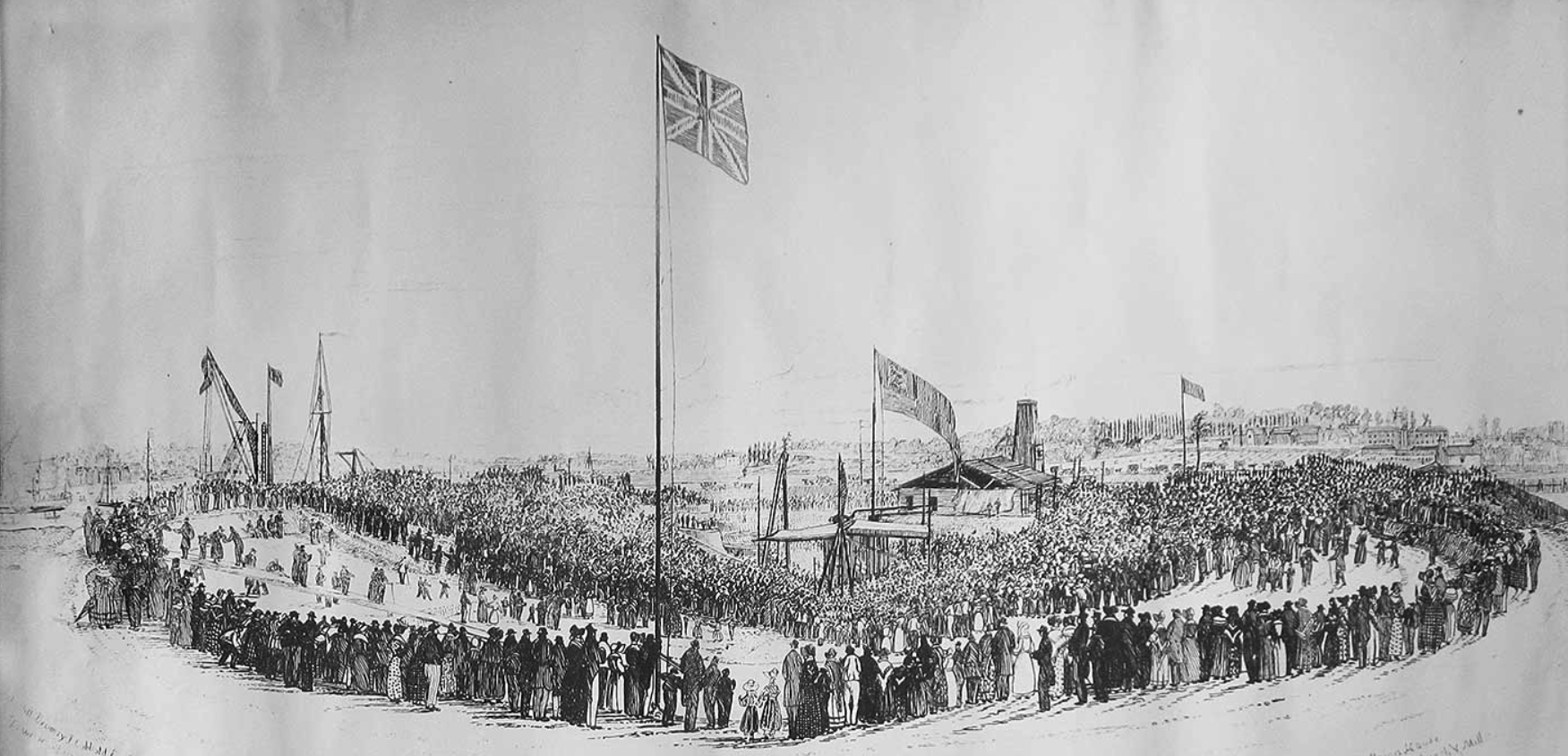
Laying of the First Stone, 26 June 1839 by George Green Sampson, Mayor of Ipswich, Dykes Alexander, Treasurer of the Ipswich Docks Commission, Peter Bartholomew Long, Clerk, Henry Robinson Palmer, vice-president of the Institute of Civil Engineers, David Thornbory, contractor. Drawing by Henry Davy.

.

In 1837 an act of Parliament (7 Will. 4 & 1 Vict. c. lxxiv) allowed the Ipswich Dock Commissioners to construct a new wet dock whilst also placing certain conditions on them. In addition to building the wet dock and providing a diversion for the river Orwell along a 'New Cut' to the west of the dock the commissioners were to allow all persons, with cattle and carriages, may thereby have free access to the dock and quays and the sides of the said new cut and channel and also to contribute to the health and recreation of the inhabitants [of Ipswich]. The Ipswich Dock Commission was provided with an investment of £25,000 and the right to borrow a further £100,000 but needed a further loan of £20,000 and also an additional levy of six pence per tonne on all imported coal to fund the project. The dock opened in 1842; the original lock gates entered the dock from the New Cut opposite Felaw Street. The new custom house (now known as the 'Old Custom House') was completed in 1845.

The development attracted new industries to the dock area, such as the coprolite factory founded by Edward Packard in 1849. This factory gave its name to Coprolite Street in the docks area.

=== Renovation following 1877 act ===
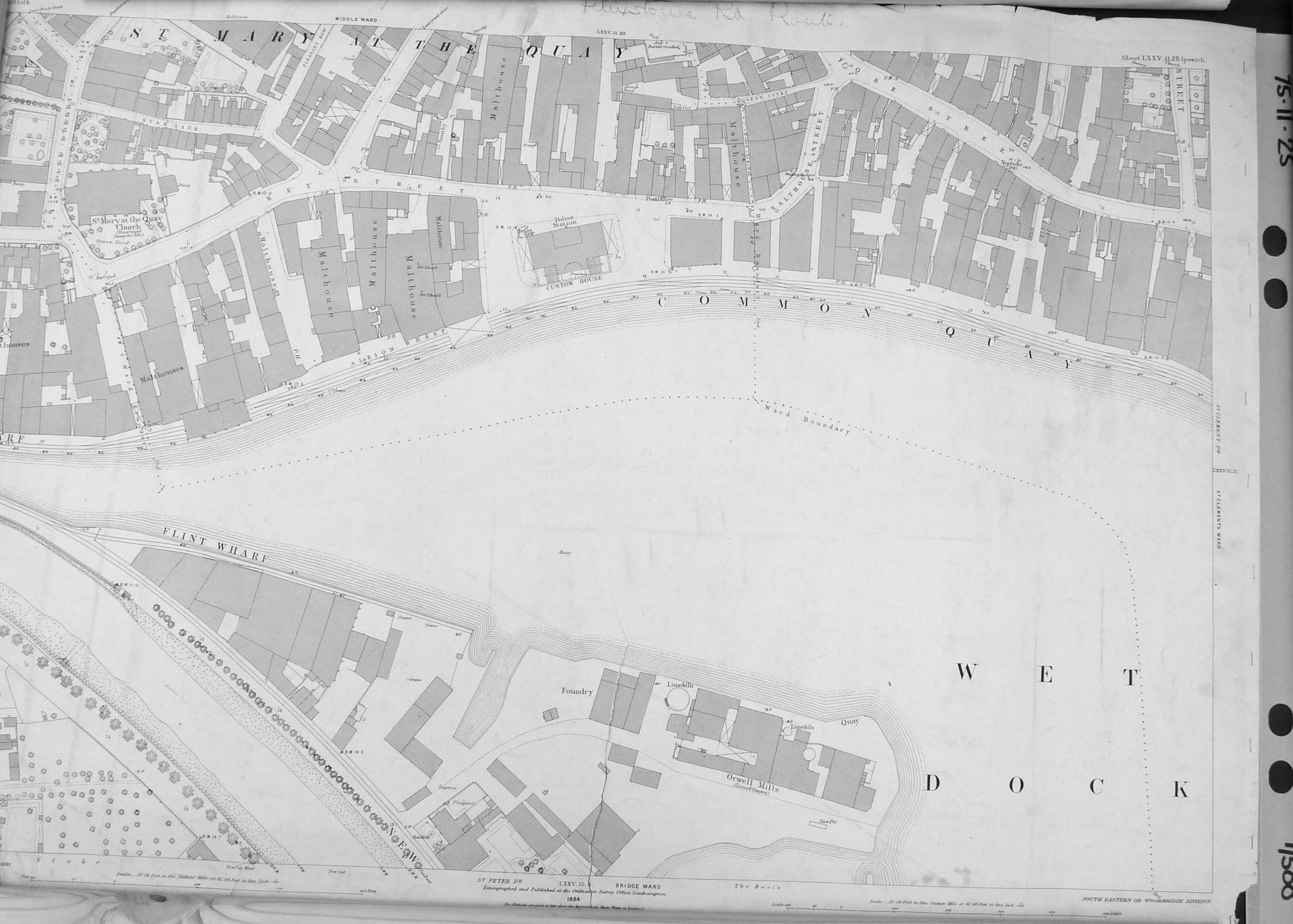
Map showing the quays to the north and east of the dock and part of the New Cut - 1884

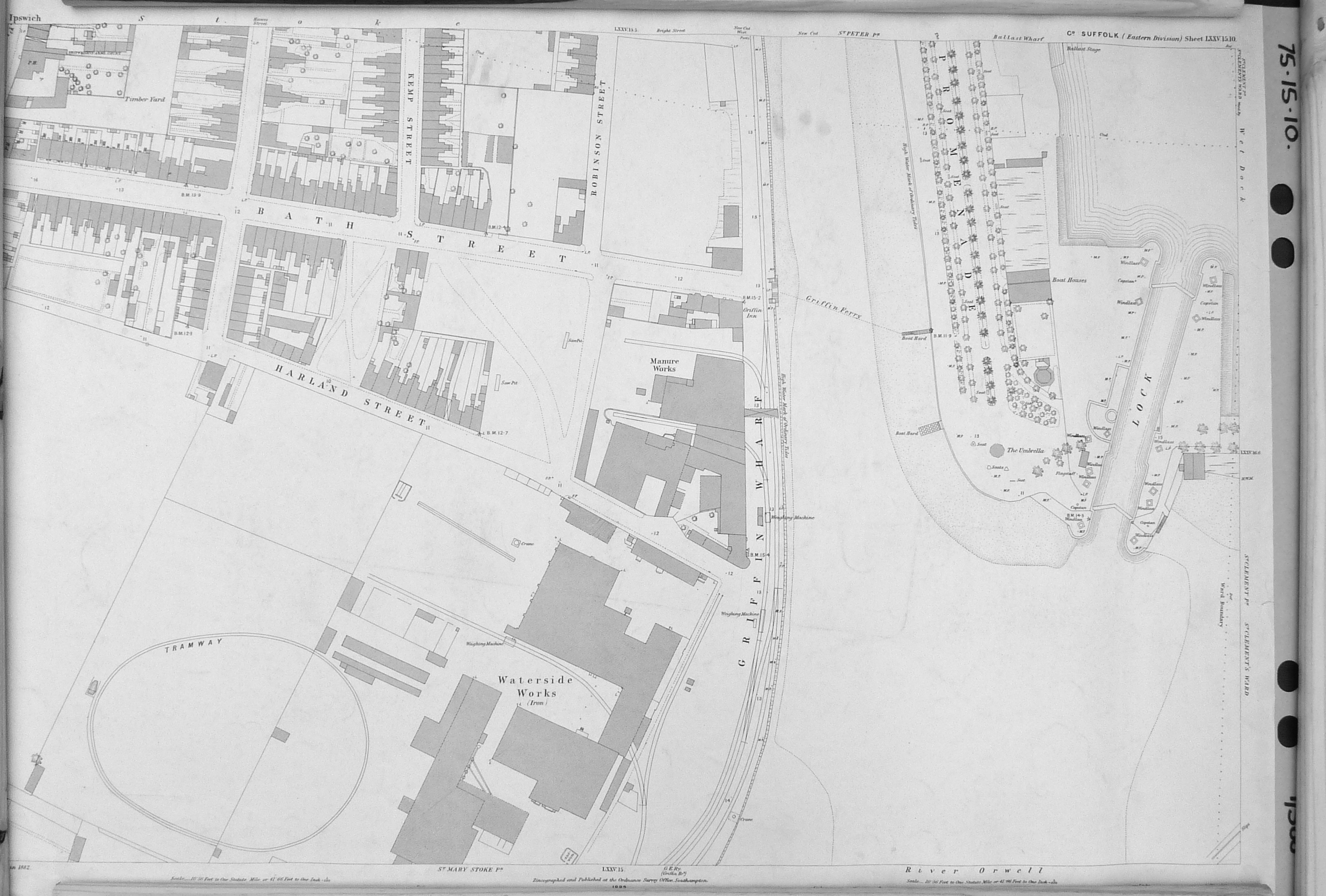
Map showing the New Cut, the lock gates, the promenade and the griffin ferry - 1884

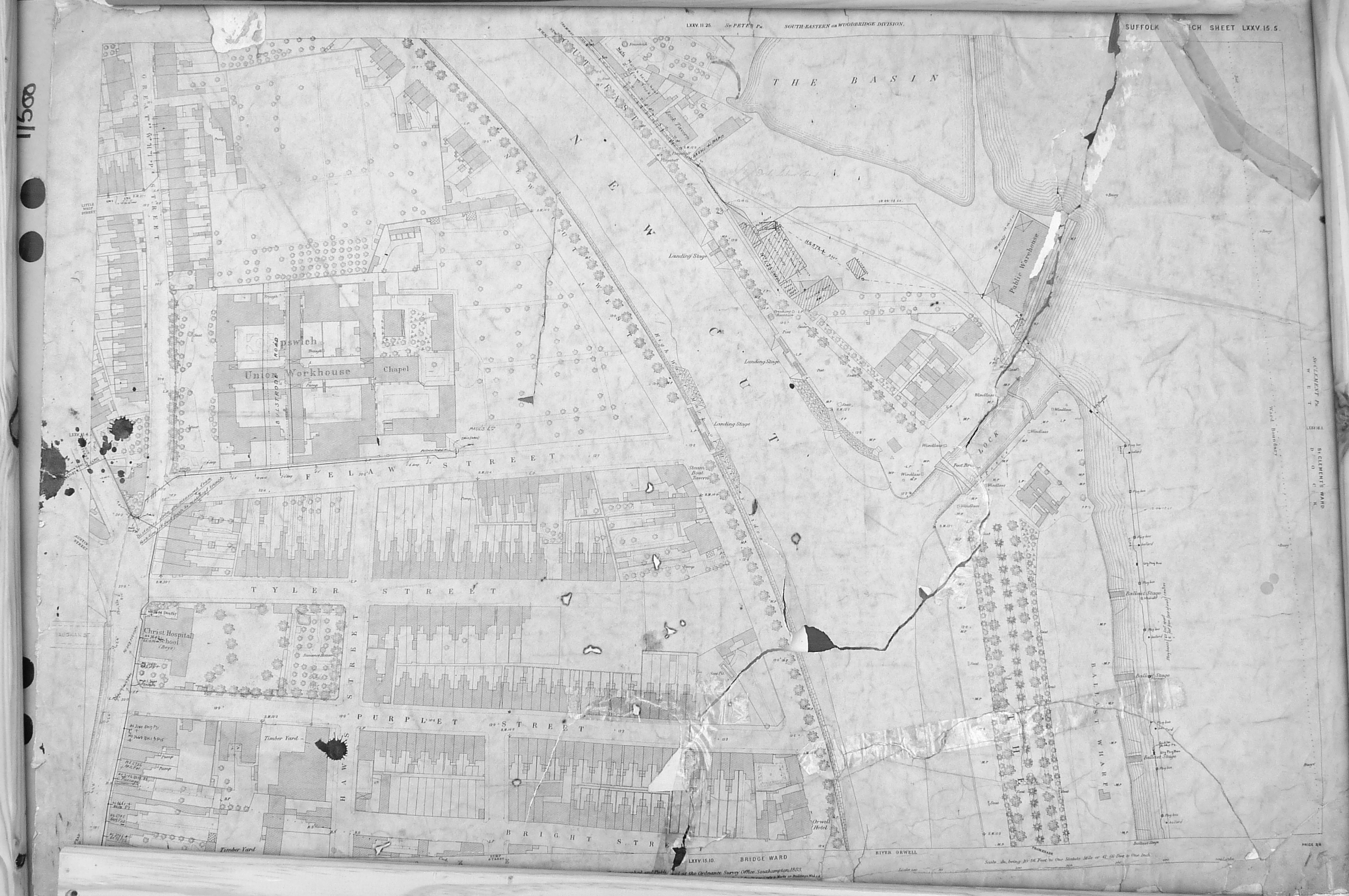
Map showing the original lock gates 1884

The Ipswich Docks Act 1877 (40 & 41 Vict. c. ccxvi) allowed for the construction of a new lock in their present position to facilitate access to the dock and allow trams to operate along the length of the 'Island' between New Cut and the dock. The new lock gates were constructed by the time of the 1898 act, which authorised the construction of a swing bridge.

Ipswich Docks Act 1913 (3 & 4 Geo. 5. c. cvi) allowed for the construction of a new entrance to the docks comprising inner and outer gates and a swing bridge, a quay and various tramways, and also allowed for the 'stopping off' of various rights of way. There was, however a condition that work had to be completed within 10 years, and following World War I, an extension was granted by an act of Parliament (8 & 9 Geo. 5. c. lvii) in 1918.

=== 1950-1973 ===
Ipswich Dock Act 1971
- Act of Parliament
- Parliament of the United Kingdom
- Long title: An Act to authorise the Ipswich Dock Commission to construct further works; and for other purposes.
- Citation: 1971 c. xiv

Dates
- Royal assent: 30 March 1971

Status: Current legislation

Text of statute as originally enacted

The Ipswich Dock Act 1971 (c. xiv) authorised the development of the West Bank to allow ro-ro ships to dock.

The Ipswich Dock Commission was reconstituted as the Ipswich Port Authority in 1973 when the first stage of the development was completed, further work was carried out in 1977 and 1979 and then again in 1998.

== Legislation ==
Ipswich Port Improvement Act 1805
- Act of Parliament
- Parliament of the United Kingdom
- Long title: An Act for improving and rendering more commodious the Port of Ipswich, in the County of Sufffolk.
- Citation: 45 Geo. 3. c. ci

Dates
- Royal assent: 10 July 1805
Other legislation
Repealed by	Ipswich Port Act 1837

Status: Repealed

Text of statute as originally enacted

Ipswich Port Act 1837
- Act of Parliament
- Parliament of the United Kingdom
- Long title: An Act to amend an Act of the Forty-fifth Year of the Reign of King George the Third, for improving and rendering more commodious the Port of Ipswich, and for constructing a Wet Dock there.
- Citation: 7 Will. 4 & 1 Vict. c. lxxiv

Dates
- Royal assent: 30 June 1837
Other legislation
Repealed by	Ipswich Port Authority Act 1986

Status: Repealed

Text of statute as originally enacted

Ipswich Dock Commission Act 1841
- Act of Parliament
- Parliament of the United Kingdom
- Long title: An Act to enable the Ipswich Dock Commissioners to raise a further Sum of Money.
- Citation: 4 & 5 Vict. c. lii

Dates
- Royal assent: 21 June 1841
Other legislation
Repealed by	Ipswich Port Authority Act 1986

Status: Repealed

Text of statute as originally enacted

Ipswich Dock Act 1843
- Act of Parliament
- Parliament of the United Kingdom
- Long title: An Act to enlarge the Powers of the Ipswich Dock Commissioners.
- Citation: 6 & 7 Vict. c. xx

Dates
- Royal assent: 9 May 1843
Other legislation
Repealed by	Ipswich Port Authority Act 1986

Status: Repealed

Text of statute as originally enacted

Ipswich Dock Act 1852
- Act of Parliament
- Parliament of the United Kingdom
- Long title: An Act to consolidate and amend the Acts relating to the Ipswich Dock, to allow certain Drawbacks, and for other Purposes.
- Citation: 15 & 16 Vict. c. cxvi

Dates
- Royal assent: 17 June 1852

Text of statute as originally enacted

Ipswich Dock Act 1877
- Act of Parliament
- Parliament of the United Kingdom
- Long title: An Act to confer further powers on the Ipswich Dock Commissioners.
- Citation: 40 & 41 Vict. c. ccxvi

Dates
- Royal assent: 10 August 1877

Text of statute as originally enacted

Ipswich Dock Act 1898
- Act of Parliament
- Parliament of the United Kingdom
- Long title: An Act to enable the Ipswich Dock Commissioners to make certain works in connexion with their dock and to confer various further powers upon the Commissioners and for other purposes.
- Citation: 61 & 62 Vict. c. cxciii

Dates
- Royal assent: 2 August 1898

Text of statute as originally enacted

Ipswich Dock Act 1913
- Act of Parliament
- Parliament of the United Kingdom
- Long title: An Act to alter the constitution of and method of election to the Ipswich Dock Commission to confer further powers on the commissioners to authorise them to construct works and acquire lands to raise additional money and to create stock and for other purposes.
- Citation: 3 & 4 Geo. 5. c. cvi

Dates
- Royal assent: 15 August 1913

Text of statute as originally enacted

Ipswich Dock Act 1918
- Act of Parliament
- Parliament of the United Kingdom
- Long title: An Act to authorise the Ipswich Dock Commission to construct additional works to alter the tonnage duties and the rates on goods which may be levied by them and for other purposes.
- Citation: 8 & 9 Geo. 5. c. lvii

Dates
- Royal assent: 21 November 1918

Text of statute as originally enacted

Ipswich Port Authority Act 1979
- Act of Parliament
- Parliament of the United Kingdom
- Long title: An Act to extend the time for the completion of the works authorised by the Ipswich Dock Act 1971; to increase the borrowing powers of the Ipswich Port Authority; and for connected purposes.
- Citation: 1979 c. ix

Dates
- Royal assent: 26 July 1979
Other legislation
Repealed by	Ipswich Port Authority Act 1986

Status: Repealed

Text of statute as originally enacted

Ipswich Port Authority Act 1986
- Act of Parliament
- Parliament of the United Kingdom
- Long title: An Act to extend the time for the completion of the works authorised by the Ipswich Dock Act 1971; to increase and amend the borrowing powers of the Ipswich Port Authority; to confer further powers on the Authority; to accord priority of passage to certain vessels passing to and from the port of Ipswich over certain other vessels not so passing; and for connected and other purposes.
- Citation: 1986 c. xv

Dates
- Royal assent: 25 July 1986

Text of statute as originally enacted

- Ipswich Dock Act 1837 (7 Will. 4 & 1 Vict. c. lxxiv)
- Ipswich Dock Act 1852 (15 & 16 Vict. c. cxvi)
- Ipswich Dock Act 1877 (40 & 41 Vict. c. ccxvi)
- Ipswich Dock Act 1898 (61 & 62 Vict. c. cxciii)
- Ipswich Dock Act 1913 (3 & 4 Geo. 5. c. cvi)
- Ipswich Dock Act 1918 (8 & 9 Geo. 5. c. lvii)
- Ipswich Dock Revision Order 1969 (SI 1969/1521)
- Ipswich Dock Act 1971 (c. xv)
- Ipswich Port Authority Act 1979 (c. ix)
- Ipswich Port Authority Act 1986 (c. xv)
- Port of Ipswich (Transfer of Undertaking) Harbour Revision Order 2002 (SI 2002/3269)

== Ipswich Dock Commission ==
Many notable local individuals were dock commissioners.
