= Goldrood House =

Coordinates: 52.0453°N 1.1382°E

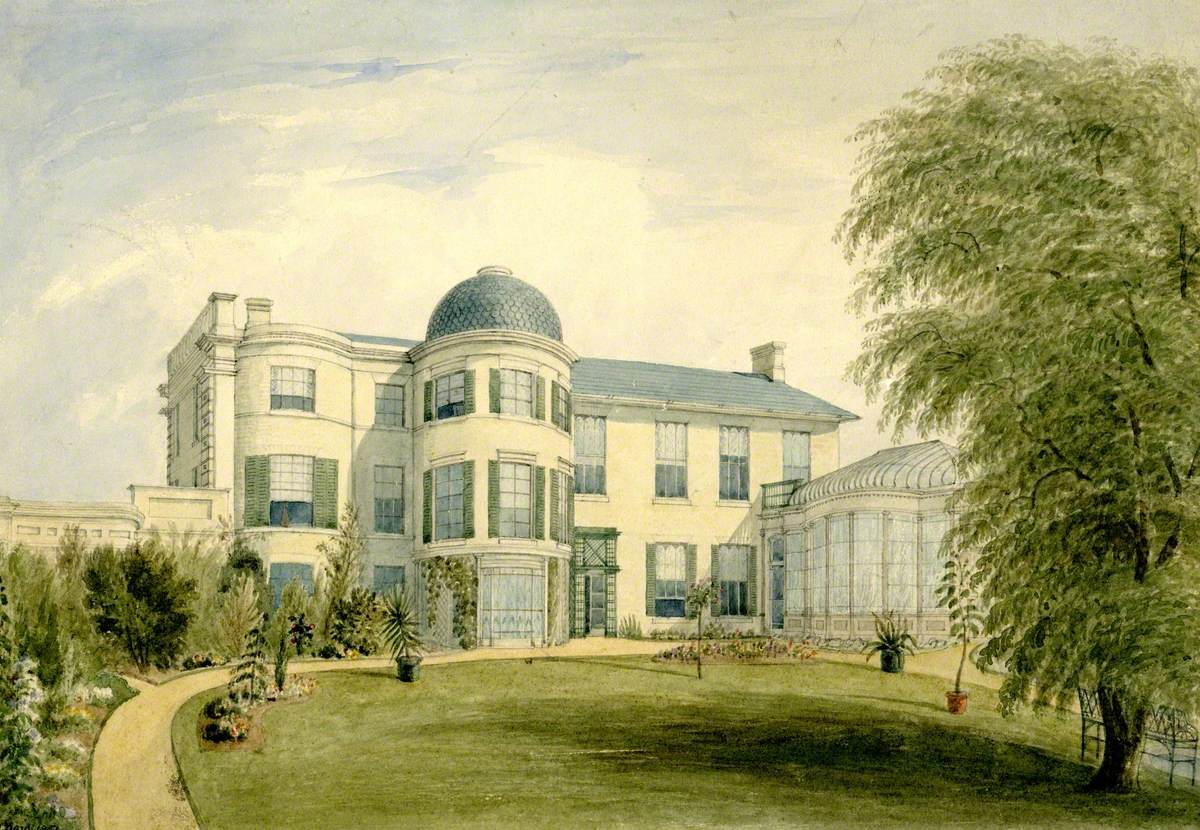
Goldrood House by Henry Davy, 1858

Goldrood House is a Grade II listed building in Chantry, Ipswich, Suffolk, England. The building is currently part of St Joseph's College.

The land was bought in 1809 by Samuel Alexander who then had the house built in 1811. It is a two-storey white brick house. It has a large 3 windowed bow on the south eastern front. It was the home of the Quaker banker Dykes Alexander.

== The Goldrood Book ==
The Goldrood Book is an album of Mary Ann Alexander which contains photographic copies of paintings of Goldrood House.. As seen on the Antiques Roadshow, Stanway 2, filmed at Stanway House in the Cotswolds.
