= Dykes Alexander =

Dykes Alexander may refer to:

- Dykes Alexander (senior) (1724–1786), English banker and Quaker
- Dykes Alexander (junior) (1763–1849), his son, English banker and Quaker minister
