= Ebenezer Goddard =

Engineer, businessman and politician based in Ipswich

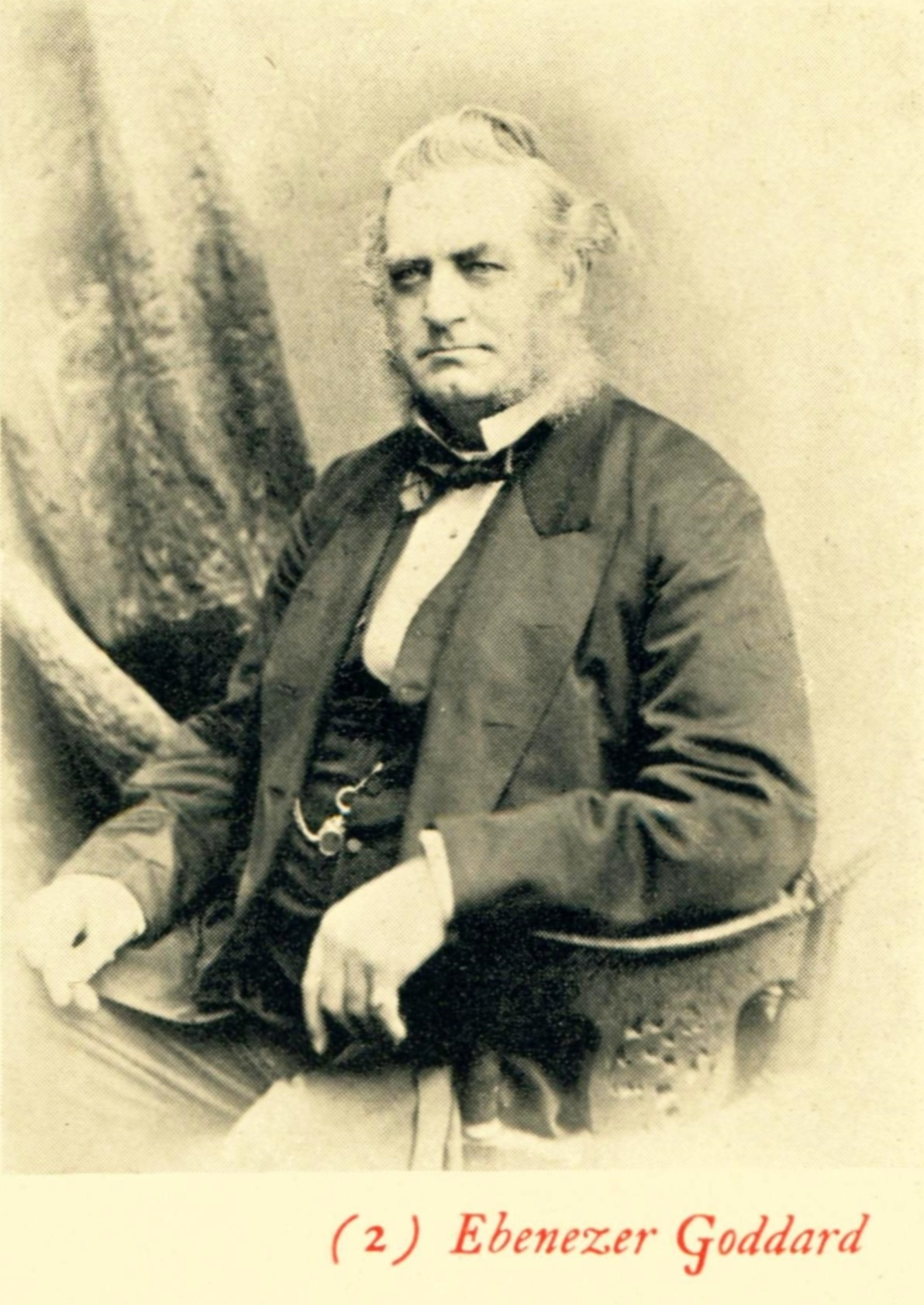
Ebenezer Goddard, about 1870

Ebenezer Goddard (10 March 1816, Ipswich–19 October 1882, Ipswich) was an Ipswich engineer, businessman and politician. He worked for Ipswich Gas Company for many years and was Mayor of Ipswich three times: 1857-1858, 1865-1866 and 1872-1873. In his capacity as mayor he laid the foundation stone for the current Ipswich Town Hall on 18 April 1866.

== Early life ==
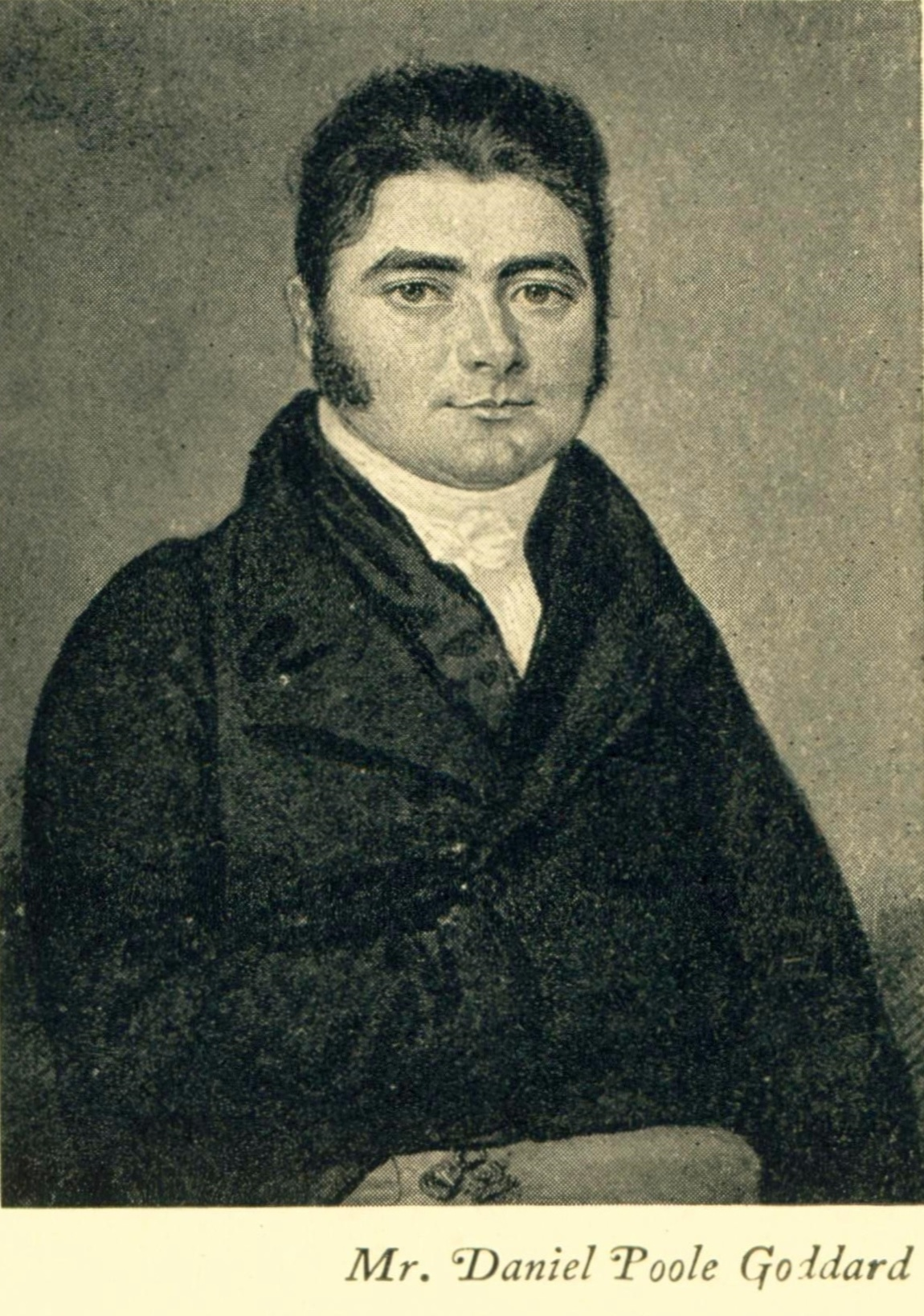
Daniel Poole Goddard (1783-1842)

Ebenezer was the son of Daniel Poole Goddard and his wife Lucy Haill. His father joined the committee of the Ipswich Gas Company in 1826, and subsequently became secretary and engineer of this organisation. Ebenezer attended school in Halesworth, Suffolk before starting an apprenticeship with J R and A Ransome. After successfully completing this he moved to Deptford where he worked for the General Steam Navigation Company. However, when his fellow workers complained that his apprenticeship was not appropriate for the work involved – and threatened a strike unless he was dismissed, he was transferred to their locomotive repair workshop in Maidenhead. After expanding his experience there, he then moved to Maudslay, Sons and Field, where it was planned he would run a piece of machinery being sold to the Turkish government to be used to print banknotes in their mint at the beginning of the Tanzimât Era. However the plan fell through and Goddard remained in England.

== Ipswich Gas Company ==
He moved to Ipswich in 1842, where his father was ill. On his father's death in November of that year, he took over as Secretary and Engineer at Ipswich Gas Company. Here he proved to be an effective businessman, the company yielding a 7 1/2% dividend in 1851 at a time when the vast majority of gas companies yielded no profits. Goddard was responsible for the company expanding its range of products to include domestic gas appliances, such as gas cookers, which were manufactured at the Ipswich Gas Works. Goddard was responsible for the design of much of these, and held their patents.

=== Patents ===
- 1850: Patent for gas stove
- 1852: Patent No. 2556 "improvements in gas burners"

== Family life ==
Ebenezer married Annie Ford, daughter of Thomas Ford. His son Daniel Ford Goddard succeeded him as Secretary and Engineer of the Ipswich Gas Company and pursued a successful career as a politician.
