= William Alexander (Quaker) =

William Alexander (3 January 1768, Needham Market,–2 April, York 1841) was an English Quaker, businessman, educator, bookseller, publisher and author, who wrote under the name Amicus.

== Early life ==
He was the third surviving son of Dykes Alexander (senior), a Quaker elder, and Martha Biddle, a Quaker minister, His sister was Mary Alexander, author and Quaker evangelist. as well as Dykes Alexander (junior). He was educated in Wandsworth. Then in 1782 he was apprenticed to Joseph Brown (1746-1808) a miller of Luton. Then in 1786 he returned to Needham Market where he worked as a mealman.

== Later life ==
By 1808 he was living in York. Here he was in charge of a girls' school, in Castlegate until 1810. Then he worked as a Printer, Stationer & Bookseller in York, where he started the Annual Monitor in 1811 and established Sessions of York.

His wife Ann (née Tuke) wrote and campaigned on behalf of chimney-boys.

He was appointed a Director of the Friends Provident Institution. He was made a Freeman of the City of York in 1813 and served as Chamberlain of the city in 1818.

== Works ==
- 1811 Some Account of the Life and Religious Experience of Mary Alexander, Late of Needham Market, York: W. Alexander
- 1820 Remarks on temporary accommodations for holding meetings for worship; principally extracted from Observations on the construction and fitting up of Meeting Houses, &c., York: W. Alexander & Son
