= Tavernspite =

Village in Pembrokeshire, Wales

Coordinates: 51.78°N 4.63°W

Tavernspite: Welsh: Tafarn-sbeit
- Location within Pembrokeshire
- Population: 349
- Community: Lampeter Velfrey
- Principal area: Pembrokeshire
- Country: Wales
- Sovereign state: United Kingdom
- Post town: WHITLAND
- Postcode district: SA34
- Dialling code: 01834
- Police: Dyfed-Powys
- Fire: Mid and West Wales
- Ambulance: Welsh
- UK Parliament: Mid and South Pembrokeshire
- Senedd Cymru – Welsh Parliament: Carmarthen West and South Pembrokeshire

Tavernspite (Welsh: Tafarn-sbeit) is a small village about 6 miles (10 km) southeast of Narberth in Pembrokeshire, southwest Wales. It lies on the B4314 Pendine to Templeton road, close to the border with Carmarthenshire and is in Lampeter Velfrey community and parish. It is a historical meeting point of several roads. The population at the 2011 census was 349.

== Name ==
Tavernspite is a corruption of Tafarn Ysbyty (Hospice Tavern), referring to the sole building at the site in the 18th century; it was believed to have been a hospice for pilgrims to St David's built by Whitland Abbey monks.

== Description ==
Tavernspite is in rural south Pembrokeshire on the B4314 road between Princes Gate and Red Roses, Carmarthenshire. The village sits on an intersection of several other country roads, including the B4328 from Whitland. It has a school, pub, garden centre and holiday park.

== History ==
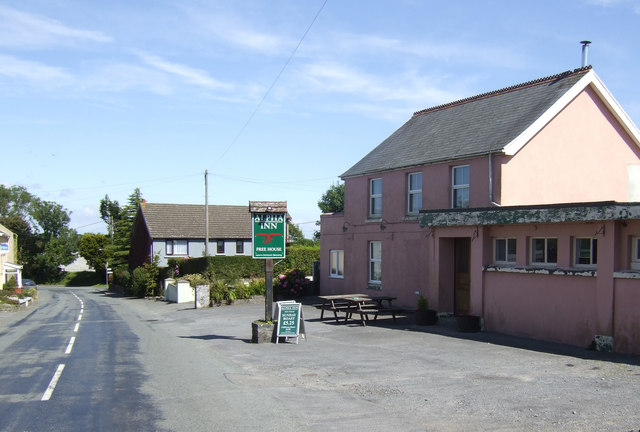
Alpha Inn, opened 1963 (date of original building unknown)

Cartographer Emanuel Bowen recorded Tavernspite in 1729 as having a building on the site of the Plume of Feathers inn.

From 1787, after the road through the village had been turnpiked (the Tavernspite Turnpike Trust was established in 1771), Tavernspite would have been known to travellers on the Ireland mail coach from London and Bristol which passed through the village on the way to Milford Haven. In 1798 the Tavernspite Roads Bill was passed by Parliament for the repairs of the roads running from the village.

In the early 1800s there were two inns.

Richard Fenton in 1811 mentions Tavernspite having an inn where the Milford mail coach could change horses and where post-chaises were kept. He examined a large tumulus half a mile before he reached the village and uncovered an urn. He describes the village as in a bleak situation on the edge of a large tract of uncultivated ground, which he finds unusual as the turnpike gives good access to markets.

In 1833 there was an establishment called the Ordnance Arms. In Lewis's 1833 Topographical dictionary Tavernspite is included in the parish of Lampeter Velfrey. He describes the settlement as

A posting inn at the entrance of the county from Carmarthen, distinguished by the name Tavern spite, occupies the site of the ancient "Taverne y spitty," an hospitium formerly belonging to Whitland abbey, upon the bank of the river Tâf; and Blaengwyddnoe, now a farm-house, was the grange of that religious establishment. To the south-west of the latter place are some very extensive earthworks, called Castel Meherin... and in a field adjoining the turnpike road, a little to the north-east, are two semicircular embankments, commanding the passage of three several valleys.

In 1840 there was an inn called the Feathers and there were 10 houses in the settlement. A pre-1850 parish map shows an inn. A school was opened by the Rev. William Seaton in 1845 and a year later there were 124 children being educated there.

Some of the toll gates on the roads around Tavernspite were caught up in the Rebecca Riots of 1843, leading the Tavernspite Turnpike Trust to publish their accounts in order to satisfy the public over how the money raised by tolls was expended.

In the 1870s two fairs were held: 20 July and 5 September.

On the Ordnance Survey maps of 1868–98, the Plume of Feathers is marked, along with a smithy, school and gate house, and there are a number of other buildings shown but not named. The county boundary between Carmarthenshire and Pembrokeshire is shown as running through the centre of the village.

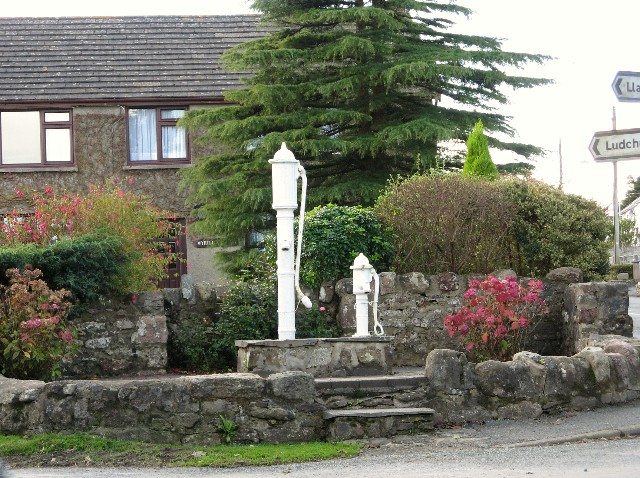
Preserved village water supply

The village is recorded as a historic place name by the Royal Commission in the early 20th century. A village hall was built in 1924, but the village did not have access to mains water until after World War 2. Prior to that, residents drew water from the village well; the pump still stands. Electricity was connected in 1953 and in the 1940s and 1950s council houses were built. The village had expanded to 56 houses by 1988.

Since there is no war memorial in the village, the possibility was raised in 2013 that Tavernspite could be a doubly thankful village, the only other known in Pembrokeshire being Herbrandston. However, it has since come to light that Levi Thomas of Tavernspite died at Gallipoli in 1915, although his name does not appear on any of the local Pembrokeshire war memorials.

The Alpha Inn was established in 1963, the building having previously been a bakery and shop, then a garage and petrol station.

== Notable people ==
- Dick Lewis (1900–1966), a Welsh politician, co-operative activist and Mayor of Ipswich, was born in the village.

== School ==
A school was opened by the Rev. William Seaton in 1845 and a year later there were 124 children being educated there. The current school, Tavernspite Community Primary, was built in 1954 and in 2018 catered for 220 pupils aged 3 to 11 years, with a number of clubs and extracurricular activities, and serving a large catchment area. The school was the first Pembrokeshire Outdoor School and is an accredited Forest School. It has been awarded The Sustainable Schools Platinum Award and voted the ‘Eco-School of the Year in Wales'.

In 2008, the school was the first in Wales to benefit from the Green Energy for Schools programme by receiving solar panels worth £20,000, sufficient to produce 3,000 kW·h of electricity each year. In 2011-12 one of the school's teachers, Adam Lopez, was a writer for The Guardian. In 2013, the school set up an advanced computer-aided tutoring system to involve pupils in modern technology.
