= Robert Burrows =

Robert Burrows may refer to:

- Robert Burrows (cricketer) (1871–1943), English cricketer
- Robert Burrows (politician) (1884–1964), British businessman and politician
- Robert Burrows (photographer) (1810–1883), English artist and pioneer of photography

== See also ==
- Robert Burrowes (Australian politician) (1822–1885)
- Robert Burrowes (Irish politician) (1810–1881)
- Robert Burrowes (priest) (died 1841), Anglican priest in Ireland
- Bob Burrow (1934–2019), American basketball player
- Rob Burrow (1982–2024), English rugby player
