= Claviger =

Claviger may refer to:

- Claviger (beetle), a genus of beetles in the family Staphylinidae
- Claviger (title)
