= Frederick Francis Seekamp =

19th century English merchant and politician

Frederick Francis Seekamp (1774–1843) was a merchant based in Ipswich, Suffolk. He traded in cheese, butter, coal and seed. He was active politically in the Ipswich Yellow Party. In 1826 he was accused of corrupt and illegal practices in his role as a Bailiff of Ipswich Corporation, through which he acted as returning officer for the Parliamentary representative for the Borough of Ipswich.

After the local government reforms introduced by the Municipal Corporations Act 1835 Ipswich Corporation became the Municipal Borough of Ipswich with a mayor, Seekamp nominated Benjamin Brame to be the first mayor in 1836. Seekamp succeeded him as mayor for the period 1836–37.

== 1826 United Kingdom general election ==
During the 1826 United Kingdom general election Seekamp was a Bailiff for Ipswich Corporation alongside Charles Chambers Hammond. Their duties included acting as returning officers for the general election.

== Family life ==
Frederick married Mary Thurston (1786–1819) with whom he had a son, Frederick Seekamp, who became an artist. On 13 September 1821, he married Elizabeth Flowerdew.
