= Robert Burrows (photographer) =

Robert Burrows (1810, Ipswich-10 November 1883, Ipswich) was an English artist and pioneer of photography.

Robert was the eldest son of a silversmith Robert Burrows (1782-1863) and his wife Elizabeth Cordy. He joined the Ipswich Society of Professional & Amateur Artists soon after it was established by Henry Davy in 1832. Davy provided artistic instruction to Burrows alongside other Ipswich artists. Burrows later served as secretary to the society.
