= Orwell Lady =

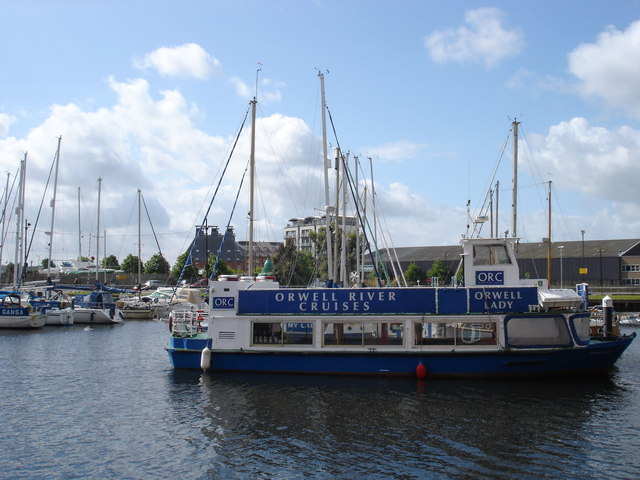
The Orwell Lady at Ipswich Dock

Orwell Lady (originally New Mary Louise) is a purpose-built river cruiser (built 1979) currently operating 13 miles (21 km) of the river Orwell and sails from Ipswich, England. The Orwell Lady is 57 feet (17 m) long and 14 feet (4.3 m) in the beam, displaces 42 tonnes, and carries 118 passengers plus crew. The Orwell Lady sails from Ipswich dock and sails to the end of the Orwell at the Port of Felixstowe allowing for views of Shotley harbour and the historic town of Harwich. The boat has a fully functioning bar and panoramic views which has helped secure the boat as a popular tourist attraction in Ipswich. In recent years the boat has become one of the most popular river cruises in East Anglia.

== History ==
The boat was built in Twickenham in 1979 and operated on the River Thames from Westminster Pier with the name New Mary Louise. The New Mary Louise was part of the Brownsea Islands Ferries based in Poole, Dorset from 1993. In 1999 her engine was rebuilt and the boat is refurbished annually. In 2001 the New Mary Louise was purchased by Orwell River Cruises Limited and renamed the Orwell Lady as a result of the owner retiring from Brownsea Islands Ferries and is licensed by the Maritime and Coastguard Agency (MCA).
