= Peter Bartholomew Long =

English politician

Peter Bartholomew Long (10 May 1805, Ipswich – 7 March 1890, Ipswich) was an English lawyer who became a prominent politician in Ipswich Corporation in the mid nineteenth century. He also trained as a painter under Henry Davy, joining the Ipswich Society of Professional & Amateur Artists. He was Mayor of Ipswich four times: 1837–1838, 1840–41, 1850–1851, 1854–1855.
