= Ipswich Gas Company =

The Ipswich Gas Company was a gas supply company formed in 1820. The Ipswich Paving Commissioners had installed 300 Smythuril's Patent Lamps in 1793. Twenty five years later Robert Ransome needed coke for his foundry, and gas suitable for gas lights was a side product. In 1818 Ransome, with his brother James and John Shewell established a small coke oven in their foundry in Old Foundry Street. Their employee, William Cubitt, made sure that the gas produced by the coke plant was collected and distributed at first to Carr Street, Tavern Street and on the Cornhill.

Dykes Alexander was the first chairman of the company. The Ipswich engineer, businessman and politician Ebenezer Goddard worked for the company for many years, as did his father Daniel Poole Goddard.
