= Kavas Jamas Badshah =

Ipswich senior officer

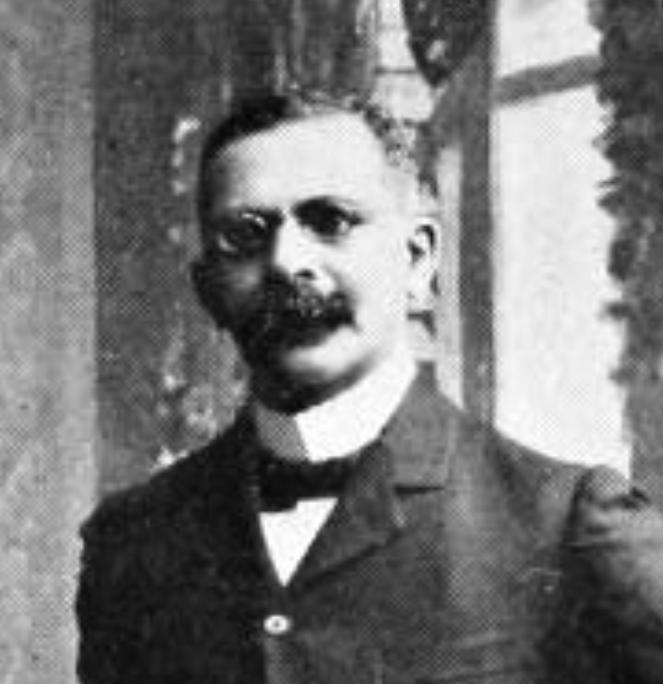
Kavas Jamas Badshah, 1898, in official photograph of senior officers of the Post Office of India

Kavas Jamas Badshah (also Kavasji Jamasji Badshah) OBE, (1858 Mumbai - 1931) was a Parsi senior officer of the Indian Civil Service who retired to Ipswich, Suffolk where he contributed to civil life and served as Mayor of Ipswich.

== Education ==
Badshah was educated at the Elphinstone High School, Mumbai followed by Bombay University. He then completed his education at University College London. He passed the exam for the Indian Civil Service in 1877 and took up appointment on 12 November 1879.

== Career in Indian Civil Service ==
- 1879: Commissioner of Excise and Salt, Bengal (Indian Salt Service)
- 1887: Post-Master of North Western Provinces and Oudh
- 1896: Deputy Director-General of the Post Office
- 1897: Comptroller of the Post Office
- 1902: Post Master General, Bengal

== Family life ==
Badshah married Emma Collington Pierson in 1885. Their son, Cecil Pierson Badshah was born in 1886 followed by Lilian Mary Collington Badshah on 14 Sep 1890 in Allahabad. His family settled in Ipswich in 1892, with Badshah joining them when he retired in 1904.

His son Cecil qualified as a solicitor and changed his name to Cecil Pierson Bradshaw in 1915. He died on 29 September 1919 in Ipswich, survived by his wife and daughter.

== Civic career in Ipswich ==
In 1913 he was elected for Middle Ward, Ipswich, becoming mayor for the period 1925-6. In 1918 he was awarded the Order of the British Empire for war services.
