= Lampeter Velfrey =

Village, parish and community in Pembrokeshire, Wales

Lampeter Velfrey: Welsh: Llanbedr Felfre
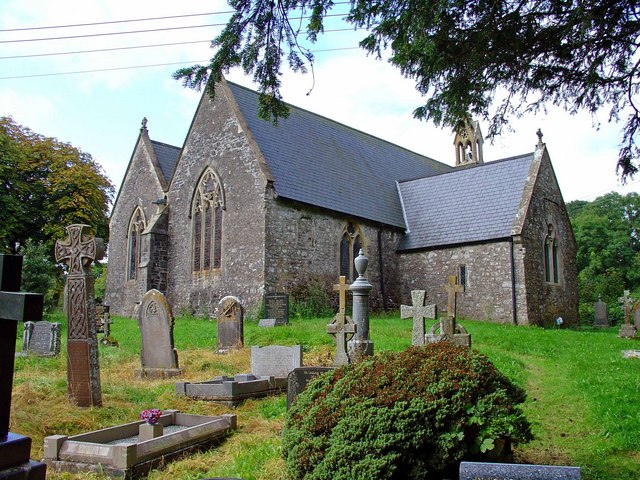
- Parish Church of St Peter

- Location within Pembrokeshire
- Population: 1,205 (in 2011)
- OS grid reference: SN 1560 1442
  - Cardiff: 68.0 mi (109.4 km)
  - London: 196.0 mi (315.4 km)
- Community: Lampeter Velfrey
- Principal area: Pembrokeshire
- Country: Wales
- Sovereign state: United Kingdom
- Post town: WHITLAND
- Postcode district: SA34
- Post town: NARBERTH
- Postcode district: SA67
- Dialling code: 01834
- Police: Dyfed-Powys
- Fire: Mid and West Wales
- Ambulance: Welsh
- UK Parliament: Mid and South Pembrokeshire
- Senedd Cymru – Welsh Parliament: Ceredigion Penfro
- List of places UK Wales Pembrokeshire 51.798°N 4.676°W Map of the community

Lampeter Velfrey (Welsh: Llanbedr Felfre) is a community and parish in the county of Pembrokeshire, Wales. In 2011 the population of the parish was 1,205, with 20.2 per cent of them able to speak Welsh. Besides Lampeter Velfrey village, other settlements in the community include Princes Gate, Ludchurch, Llan-mill, Melinau and Tavernspite.

The old Medieval spelling was "Velfre"

== Governance ==
An electoral ward of the same name exists. This ward stretches beyond the confines of Lampeter Velfrey with a total population of 1,598.

== History ==
The parish was in the former Narberth Hundred, and appeared on a 1578 parish map as Llanbeder Velfray. In the 1830s had a population of 984. Limestone was quarried locally for building and for lime. There was a parochial school in the 1800s. Local historian Geoffrey Morris was rector of Lampeter Velfrey parish until 2008 and wrote a history of the village in 2007. Archives Wales holds a number of historical papers on the village and its former inhabitants.

== Worship ==
The parish church (Church in Wales) of St Peter is a Grade II-listed building, recorded by Cadw in 1971, and was first mentioned in records in 1291. The present church, which may have replaced earlier chapelries, dates from the 13th and 14th centuries and was restored in the 19th and 20th centuries. The bell is dated 1639 and the early Henry Jones organ 1853.

There are two Independent chapels in the village: Bryn Sion (established 1859) and Carfan (established 1804).

== See also ==
- List of localities in Wales by population
