= Benjamin Brame =

Lawyer and politician in Ipswich, Suffolk

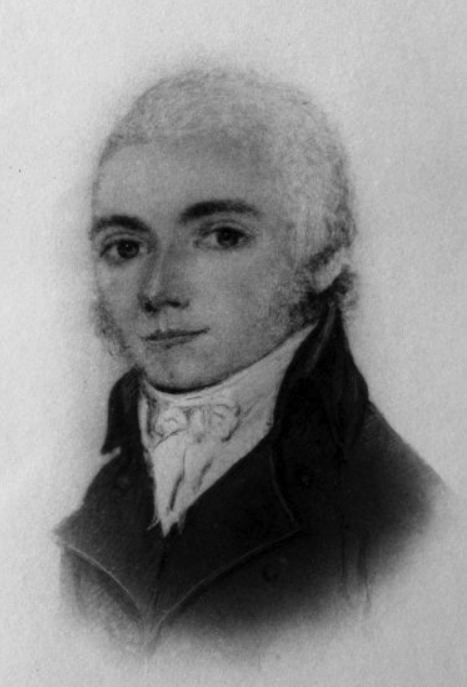
- Benjamin Brame form Vick's
- Born: 1772
- Died: 1851
- Occupation(s): Lawyer; Politician

Mayor of Ipswich
- In office January 1836 – 1836

Benjamin Brame (1772–1851) was the first mayor of Ipswich Corporation following the creation of the role by the passing of the Municipal Corporations Act 1835. He was elected on 31 December 1835 and commenced his mayoralty on 1 January 1836.

Benjamin was known as Benjamin Brame junior as he shared the same name as his father and sometimes followed in his father's footsteps in his political career. For example his father had been treasurer of Ipswich Corporation from 1806 to 1808 Benjamin Brame junior the filled this role from 1809 until 1829.

Brame was a solicitor with offices in Lower Brook Street, St. Peter's Parish. He was enrolled as a Freeman on 8 September 1794. He was one of the ten aldermen established by the Municipal Corporations Act, and aligned with the Whig party. He was nominated for mayor by Frederick Francis Seekamp and seconded by William May.

Brame had been a burgess and supported Henry Baring in the 1818 United Kingdom general election, in which Baring was narrowly defeated by William Newton.
