= St Joseph's College, Ipswich =

St Joseph's College
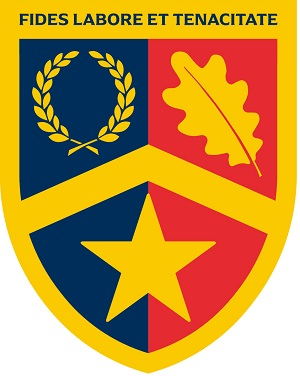

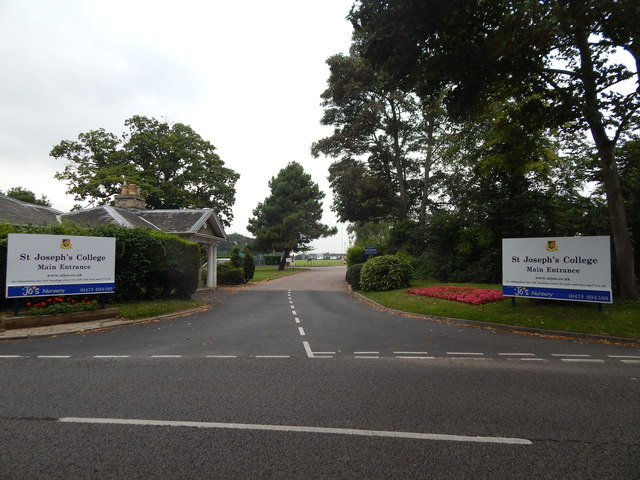
- The main entrance to St Joseph's College

Location
- Belstead Road; Ipswich, Suffolk, IP2 9DR; England; 52.043986°N 1.1348°E

Information
- Type: Private day and boarding school
- Motto: Fides Labore Et Tenacitate ("Faith by hard work and tenacity")
- Religious affiliation: Catholic
- Established: 1937
- Principal: Danielle Clarke
- Gender: Coeducational
- Age: 2 to 19
- Enrolment: 600
- Houses: 4
- Former pupils: Old Birkfeldians
- Website: https://www.stjos.co.uk/

St Joseph's College is a co-educational independent school of 550-600 day and boarding pupils between the ages of 2 and 19 in South West Ipswich, Suffolk, England, on a 60-acre campus, which includes administrative offices in the Georgian Birkfield House, a nursery and Prep School, the College Chapel, and teaching and sports facilities. Also in the grounds are the College's two boarding houses, Goldrood and The Mews.

== History ==
St Joseph's College was established in 1937 by the De La Salle Brothers, a Catholic order. The original site for the school was at nearby Oak Hill. When Birkfield House was bought, Oak Hill was used as the College's prep school. With the creation of a new, purpose-built prep facility, Oak Hill ceased to be part of the school site. In 1996 the school merged with a girls' school, the Convent of Jesus and Mary, and became independent of the De La Salle order. However, the order retained the freehold of the site and charged rent to the school. In 2014, the school bought the freehold outright. As a result of the merger with the girls' school, the College crest was altered. Whilst the crest had previously borne two oak leaves (reflecting Oak Hill, the original grounds of the school), and the de la Salle star, the design at that time replaced one of the oak leaves with a crown of thorns from the crest of the Jesus and Mary Convent School.

== Future development ==
The College campus has evolved over the decades. There is a ''Building for the Future" programme underway. Phases 1 and 2 have already been completed, with a new Technology Centre and a state-of-the-art Sixth Form Centre. Other buildings on the site include the Prep School, with rounded walls, a circular library and high-tech classrooms. The grounds include trees, shrubberies, gardens, sports pitches and open spaces. The College has an Astroturf for all weather sports, tennis courts, a sports hall and a changing room block/PE office.

== House system ==
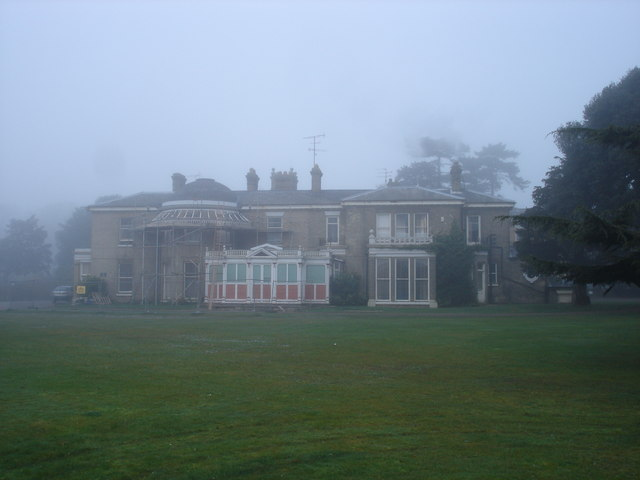
Goldrood House

The College currently has four houses:

- Birkfield (Red)
- Goldrood (Yellow)
- La Salle (Green)
- Orwell (Blue)

Birkfield House takes its name from the Georgian building of the same name found at the centre of the campus. Birkfield House was the original building that the school moved into in 1946. Birkfield Mews is one of the two boarding houses on campus, but it is more commonly known as ‘The Mews’. Goldrood House is named after ‘The Gold Rood’ house and estate, which the school acquired in 1963. The mansion, built in 1811 is now home to 50 boarders, having previously been the home of the Prep School. Prior to the Mansion's existence, the land held an ancient cross - or rood - erected in monastic times. La Salle House is named in honour of the College's patron saint, John-Baptist de la Salle (1651–1719), a French priest and educational reformer who spent his life teaching poor children in parish charity schools. Saint John-Baptist is also the patron saint of teachers. Orwell House takes its name from the River Orwell flowing through Suffolk and visible from the first floor windows of the buildings on the College campus.

The house system originally had two houses designated for day pupils and two for boarders, all named after major figures in England's Roman Catholic history:

- Campion (named after St Edmund Campion, an English Jesuit and martyr) (green) [Boarders]
- Sherwin (named after St Ralph Sherwin, an English martyr) (blue) [Boarders]
- More (named after St Thomas More, English lawyer, politician and martyr) (black) [Day pupils]
- Beckett (named after St Thomas Becket, an early archbishop of Canterbury and martyr) (orange) [Day pupils]

== Boarding ==
The College offers full, weekly and flexi-boarding and its boarders come from both the United Kingdom and overseas. Goldrood House is used for younger male boarding students and The Mews for female boarders, as well as Sixth Form boys, with separate sleeping areas.

== Annual Rugby Festival ==
The National Schools Rugby Festival was launched in 1987 to commemorate the Golden Jubilee of the College. Schools invited to take part come from both the state and independent sectors. The festival has previously featured: former England captain Chris Robshaw; British and Irish Lion Mako Vunipola; England winger Charlie Sharples; Zach Mercer; Mike Tindall; Jonathan Joseph; and Marcus Smith.

== Chapel ==
One of the most notable buildings on the campus is the College Chapel. Built in a modern style, the Chapel design echoes the form of a tent, like those used by the Israelites whilst they were in the desert. In 2017, just as the Chapel reached its 50th anniversary, serious flaws in the roof were discovered. The building was temporarily closed for renovations, which were completed in 2019 and the Chapel was reopened to welcome the College community once again.

== Old Birkfeldians ==
The Old Birkfeldians is the Alumni Association of St Joseph's College. It is named after the site of the original school (Birkfield House). It has been merged with the Alumni Association of the old Junior School (Old Oakhillians).

- Richard Ayoade, actor and comedian
- Derek Henderson, international DJ
- Sean Blowers, actor
- Sir Dominick Chilcott, British High Commissioner to Sri Lanka and Ambassador to Iran, Ireland and Turkey
- Dominic Christian, CEO of Aon UK
- Brian Eno, musician
- Jonathan Green, journalist
- Matt Henry, New Zealand cricketer
- Matt Hunn, Kent cricketer
- Trevor Jacques, writer and researcher in the area of consensual BDSM, sexual fetishism and sexual health
- Lewis Ludlam, Northampton Saints rugby player
- John McDonnell, Labour Shadow Chancellor of the Exchequer
- Pablo Miller
- Pat Mills, comics writer and editor
- Chris Mullin, Labour Member of Parliament
- Dan Murphy, Harlequins rugby player
- Peter Nelson, 9th Earl Nelson, hereditary peer
- Vincent Regan, actor
- Drew Locke, rugby
- Louise Rickard, rugby player
- James Rowe, professional football manager
- George Wacokecoke, Bath rugby player
- Richard Westbrook, racing driver
- David Willis, journalist

== Sexual abuse ==
Francis Carolan, a former RE schoolmaster and assistant housemaster at St Joseph's College, was remanded in custody and charged in November 2021 with four offences of indecent assault on a boy aged between 14 and 15 in the early 1990s. Carolan committed suicide shortly before his trial was due to take place.

== Popular culture ==
In August 2005, the school became the setting for the third and final season of Channel 4's historical reality show That'll Teach 'Em. The school was re-branded as "Charles Darwin Grammar School" and took thirty sixteen-year-olds for a month of 1950s-style boarding school education, with an emphasis on practical sciences.
