= Trevor Jacques =

Canadian writer

Trevor H. Jacques
- Born: 24 July 1956; Dorking, Surrey, England
- Died: 22 May 2021 (aged 64); Toronto, Ontario, Canada
- Education: BSc, A.R.C.S., GradInstP
- Alma mater: Royal College of Science, Imperial College
- Occupations: IT consultant, author, sex researcher, and sex educator
- Years active: 1979–2021
- Organization(s): Associate of the Royal College of Science; Graduate of the Institute of Physics; Member of the Royal College of Science Association
- Known for: Sex education and advocacy
- Notable work: On The Safe Edge (1993); Alternate Sources (1996); Gay Guide Canada (1997); Canada's Gay Guide (1998, 1999)
- Awards: Pantheon of Leather award, Canadian Region (1994, 1997)
- Website: TrevorJacques.com

Trevor H. Jacques (24 July 1956 – 22 May 2021) was a Canadian author, activist, sex researcher, and IT consultant based in Toronto, Ontario, Canada. His research and writing were in the area of consensual BDSM, sexual fetishism and sexual health. He was also a BDSM switch.

Jacques was best known for two notable sex books: On The Safe Edge: A Manual for SM Play and Alternate Sources.

== Biography ==
Jacques attended St. Joseph's College, Birkfield, Ipswich, a school run by the De La Salle brothers, from 1967 to 1974. He earned his degree in Physics from the Imperial College of Science and Technology in 1978, thereby becoming an associate of the Royal College of Science (A.R.C.S.) and graduate the Institute of Physics (GradInstP.). From 1979, he worked for Seismograph Service Ltd. as a field seismologist off the coast of the French Congo and Gabon and in England, for two and a half years, before designing the acceptance test specifications and procedure for the missile management system of a European aircraft for Computing Devices Company, in Hastings, East Sussex. In 1981, he emigrated to Toronto to work at Spar Aerospace for nine years on an infrared surveillance system for the Canadian and U.S. navies. Subsequently, he moved to SmartStar and Orapro (database companies) in Toronto, as head of technical support and then director of consulting. He was CIO at Stott Pilates (now Merrithew Health and Fitness) for three years (1998–2001), and continues to provide IT consulting to the company.

=== Later ===
He co-founded Toronto's Safer SM Education seminar series in 1991, along with co-authors of On The Safe Edge, Dr. Dale McCarthy (1937–2007, co-founder of the AIDS Committee of Toronto (ACT)), Michael Hamilton, and Sniffer (the latter being a dentist and teacher at the University of Toronto), and both organised and presented the seminars for thirteen years (1991–2004). The seminars led to both the publication of On The Safe Edge and updated versions of Safer SM (a BDSM safer sex pamphlet published by the AIDS Committee of Toronto).

Jacques edited and published Gay Guide Canada and Canada's Gay Guide, 1998 and 1999. He also sponsored the production and printing Toronto's Pride Guide in 1996, 1997, and 1998 on behalf of Pride Toronto. In 2001 and 2002, he edited and published the souvenir guide for the Mr. Leatherman Toronto Competition.

Jacques has contributed articles, interviews, and expert advice to dozens of magazines, newspapers, and radio and television stations in North America and Europe.

Jacques served as an expert witness in the 1998 "Bondage Bungalow" case in north Toronto. On The Safe Edge was cited in the submissions by the BDSM community in London, England to the Law Commission as it prepared its report "Consent in the Criminal Law" (consultation paper 139), as a result of the Spanner case.

In 2009, Jacques was featured in the fourth Canadian edition of the sexuality textbook Understanding Human Sexuality.

Jacques's most recent publication is BDSM: Safer Kinky Sex, in both English and French, for the AIDS Committee of Toronto. It is the third major revision of a safer sex education pamphlet created and edited by the Toronto BDSM community, this time large enough to take the form of a booklet. He also edited the two variants of the previous version (see References). Jacques was invited by ACT to launch the French version in Montréal, in May 2011.

== Awards and recognition ==
- Pantheon of Leather Canadian Award, 1994.
- Honorary board member of the Leather Archives and Museum, 1996.
- Pantheon of Leather Canadian Award, 1997.
- Mr. Leatherman Toronto Competition Francis Robichaud Memorial award for consistent significant contributions to Toronto's gay and lesbian community, 2001
- AIDS Committee of Toronto, 10 years outstanding service, 2002

== Conferences ==
- Guelph Sexuality Conference, University of Guelph, Ontario, 1997. Poster session.
- Association of American Sex Educators, Counselors, and Therapists/Society for the Scientific Study of Sexuality (AASECT/SSSS), St. Louis, Missouri, 1999. Presentation.
- International Academy of Sex Research (IASR), Annual Meeting, Paris, 2000. Presentation.
- Society for the Scientific Study of Sexuality (SSSS), Montréal, Québec, 8 November 2002. Presentation.
- International Academy of Sex Research (IASR), Annual Meeting, Bloomington, Indiana, 2003. Presentation.
- TOKink conference, Toronto, Canada, 30 April 2006. Keynote.
- 9th. International Conference on Bisexuality, Toronto, Canada, 16 June 2006. Keynote.

== Media ==
- Too Much 4 Much, CityTV (1992). Interview about Nine Inch Nails’ Happiness in Slavery
- SexTV, season 1, episode 4, 7 November 1998. Feature interview about BDSM.
- TVOntario, (1999). Panel member following first showing of Tops and Bottoms.
- Sex Matters, 26 February 2010. Interview about BDSM.
