= David Willis (journalist) =

English journalist

David Rowland Willis (born 29 September 1960 in London) is an English journalist who lives in the United States.

== Education ==
Willis was educated at St Joseph's College, an independent school in the county town of Ipswich in Suffolk, followed by Harlow Technical College, since renamed Harlow College, in the new town of Harlow in Essex.

== Career ==
Willis entered journalism after college as a cub reporter on the Hertfordshire Mercury newspaper and joined the BBC in 1983. After spells in local radio and regional television, he moved to London to assume the role of political correspondent, based at the Houses of Parliament. His career as a foreign correspondent began in 1994, after he was appointed the BBC's Asia correspondent. During six years based in Singapore, he covered the Hong Kong handover, the funeral of Mother Teresa of Calcutta, and the death of Chinese leader Deng Xiaoping and obtained exclusive pictures of the Cambodian dictator Pol Pot's "trial" by fellow Khmer Rouge cadres. He also reported first-hand on the downfall of Indonesia's president Suharto, as well as the subsequent bloodbath in East Timor– during which he was briefly jailed by the Indonesian authorities – and broke a series of exclusive reports relating to the downfall of Singapore-based "rogue trader" Nick Leeson.

Appointed the BBC's California correspondent in January 2000, Willis has since covered a string of top stories in north, south and Central America. He travelled the length and breadth of the country after 9/11, gauging reaction to the attacks on the Pentagon and World Trade Center, chronicled the economic collapse in Argentina–during which he and his crew were tear-gassed on the streets of Buenos Aires–and spent the 2002 football World Cup reporting from Rio de Janeiro on the progress of the ultimately triumphant Brazil national team. He unearthed exclusive and disturbing evidence of child soldiers serving on the front line in Colombia's drugs war, and covered the 2002 election of Luiz Inácio Lula da Silva as president of Brazil. For the last ten years he has also covered the Academy Awards.

Willis has also served as a war correspondent. He was "embedded" with U.S. forces during the 2003 military invasion of Iraq, and filed vivid dispatches from the front line, as American marines battled their way to Baghdad. He survived an ambush by members of the Republican Guard, and attacks on the marine unit to which he was assigned. His reports also featured prominently on National Public Radio (NPR) and ABC News, and in a BBC book, The Battle for Iraq. Since the invasion, he has undertaken a string of difficult and dangerous follow-up assignments in Iraq.

In 2003 Willis was invited to take up a place on the Reuters Fellowship, which every year provides study scholarships to senior journalists from around the world. During the three-month sabbatical as a visiting scholar at Oxford University, he conducted research on the relationship between the Bush administration and the media. Some of his current projects include covering breakthroughs in the fight against Alzheimer's disease, health problems occurring as a result of oil drilling in Colorado, and long-form news subjects. He has also served as a regular guest presenter of the BBC Radio 4 programme "Americana".

Willis lives in Silver Lake, California, and is currently working on a book, a humorous account of his journey at attempting stardom, and a tongue-in-cheek look at how easy—or difficult—it is to break into Hollywood. He drew inspiration from his six-month sabbatical from the BBC in 2006, during which he tried to become a successful thespian. In an article he said, "Although I won't be giving up the day job any time soon, as far as acting is concerned I've caught the bug, and it's much too early to take the final bow."

== Personal life ==
Willis became a naturalised US citizen on 21 June 2019 in Los Angeles, California.

== Selected articles ==
- The Long Goodbye: Part 1, 30 July 2008
- Gas Boom / BBC World News America, 30 April 2008
- Bad spelling shot down in US, 8 May 2008
- LA workers swap cars for subway, 22 May 2008
- Britney's MTV comeback falls flat, 10 September 2007
- A Hollywood romance, 6 October 2006
- Finding the actor's inner anger, 30 June 2006
- Perfecting the Hollywood headshot, 8 June 2006
- From front line to chorus line, 4 May 2006
