= George Josselyn =

English politician (1807-1888)

George Josselyn (1 January 1807 Belstead – 6 May 1888) was an English solicitor and Conservative Party politician who played a prominent part in civic life in Ipswich, Suffolk.

== Family life ==
Josselyn married Elizabeth Browne Bell, the daughter of Captain Scarlet Browne Bell, of the East India Company, who had died before she was born.

== Political career ==
Josselyn was an Alderman of Ipswich from 1846 to 1878 and served as mayor of Ipswich three times in 1842–3, 1851–2 and 1859–60.

== Business career ==
George was a director of the Great Eastern Railway.
