= Mary Whitmore =

First woman to be Mayor of Ipswich, England

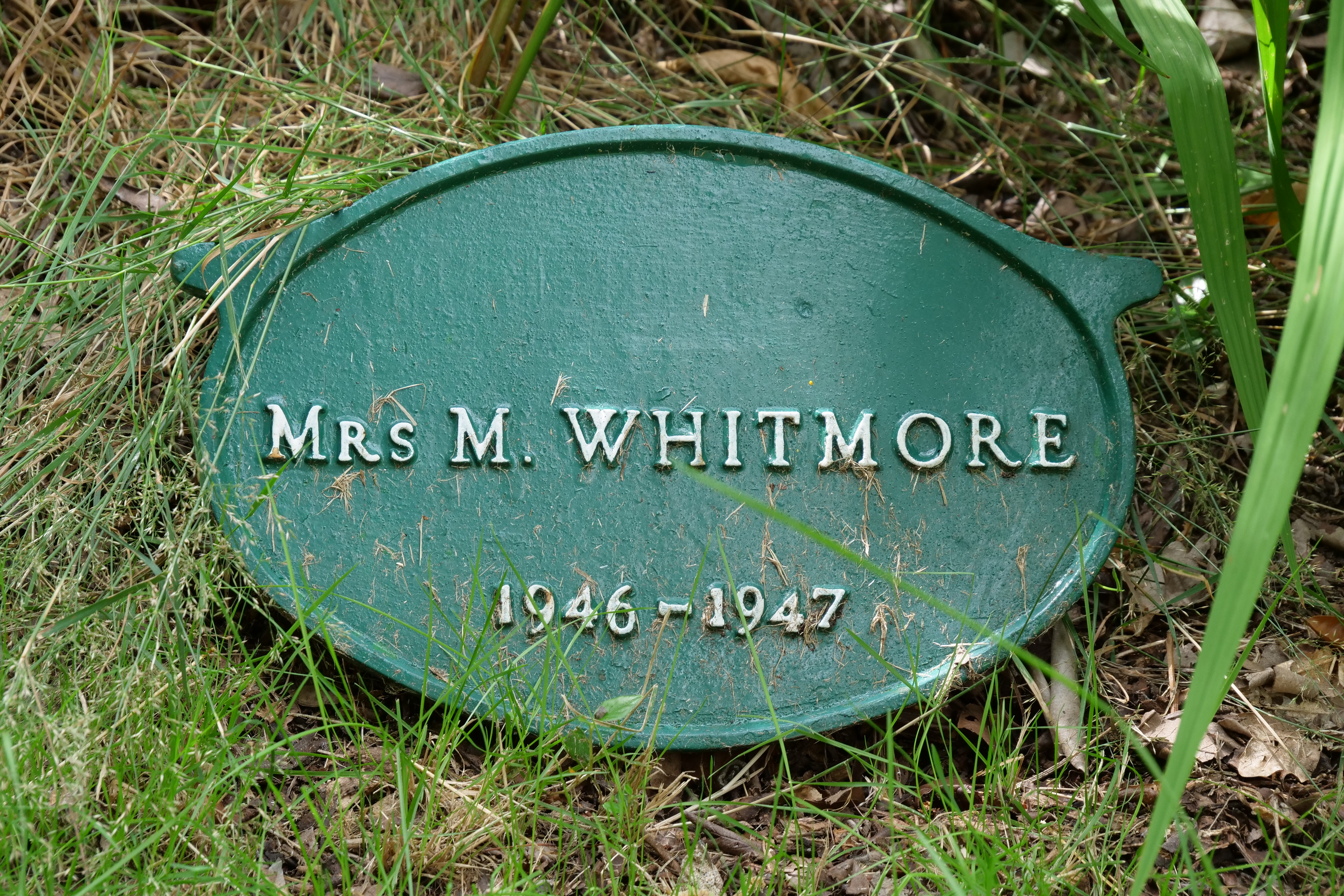
- Plaque commemorating Mary Whitmore, Mayor's Walk, Christchurch Park
- Born: September 17, 1884
- Died: July 19, 1974 (aged 89)
- Occupation: Teacher

Mayor of Ipswich
- In office January 1946 – 1947

Mary Whitmore (née Fletcher) (17 September 1884 – 19 July 1974) was an English social activist who was the first woman to be Mayor of Ipswich, in 1946–47.

== Early life ==
Whitmore was born Mary Fletcher in 1884 in Whitton, Suffolk, to Isaac Fletcher and his wife Rosetta (née Elliott). She won a scholarship to Ipswich Higher Grade School in 1895. By 1901 she was a pupil teacher at a board school. She later trained as a teacher at Whitelands College.

== Career ==
Whitmore was a suffragette, and was a founder member of the Ipswich branch of the Women's Social and Political Union. She was a founder member of the Ipswich Workers' Educational Association, and was its secretary from 1929 to 1939.

She was elected a Labour Councillor in 1930. She was Mayor of Ipswich in 1946–47, and was the first woman to hold the post.

For many years she taught at Nacton Road Mixed School.

She was awarded MBE in the 1951 Birthday Honours for her contribution to public service.

An Ipswich Society blue plaque was installed on Ipswich Town Hall in 2016.

== Personal life ==
Whitmore married James Offer William Whitmore (1882-1944) in 1922. He had previously been married to Eva Martha Pryke (1883-1920). Mary and James had one daughter, Enid (1923-2016), who married a clergyman, Trevor Howard.

Whitmore died in 1974, aged 89, at the Rectory at Belchamp Otten, in Essex; her son-in-law, Canon Trevor Howard, was Rector of St Ethelbert & All Saints, Belchamp Otten, 1959–93.
