= Dick Lewis (politician) =

Welsh politician and activist

Richard Lewis
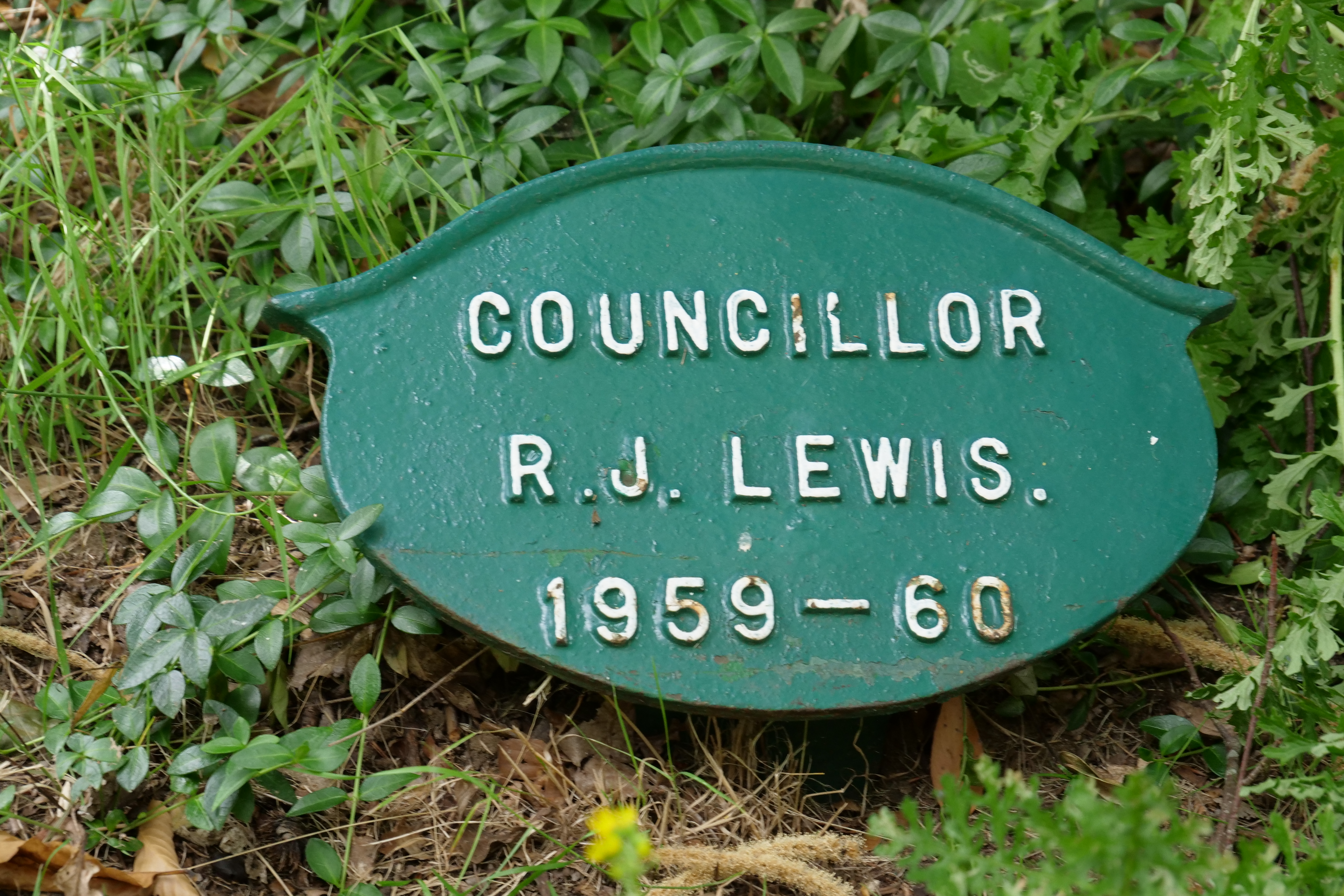
- Plaque commemorating Richard Lewis, Mayor's Walk, Christchurch Park
- Born: Richard James Lewis; 4 October 1900; Tavernspite, Wales
- Died: 20 January 1966 (aged 65)
- Occupation(s): Miner; Educationalist

Mayor of Ipswich
- In office 1959–1960

Richard James Lewis (4 October 1900 – 20 January 1966) was a Welsh politician and co-operative activist.

Born in Tavernspite, in Pembrokeshire, Lewis grew up in Rhondda and studied at Treorchy Grammar School. When he was fourteen, he began working at the local coal mine, joining the South Wales Miners' Federation (SWMF). In 1921, the SWMF sponsored him to attend the Central Labour College for two years, after which he returned to Rhondda, where he was active in the 1926 UK general strike, although this left him unemployed. In 1927, he was elected to Rhondda Urban District Council.

In 1928, Lewis moved to London, to work for the National Council of Labour Colleges as an organiser of tutors. In 1930, he also became education secretary of the Ipswich Co-operative Society, and was then a founding member of the education executive of the Co-operative Union.

During World War II, Lewis formed the Ipswich Committee Against Malnutrition, which distributed cheap milk for children and elderly people, a scheme later rolled out nationally. He was elected to Ipswich Town Council for the Labour Party in 1942, and stood unsuccessfully for Liverpool West Derby as a Labour Co-operative candidate at the 1945 UK general election, and then in Sudbury and Woodbridge at the 1951 and 1955 UK general elections.

In 1959/60, Lewis served as Mayor of Ipswich. He died in 1966, following an unsuccessful operation.
