= Ipswich Town Hall =

Municipal building in Ipswich, Suffolk, England

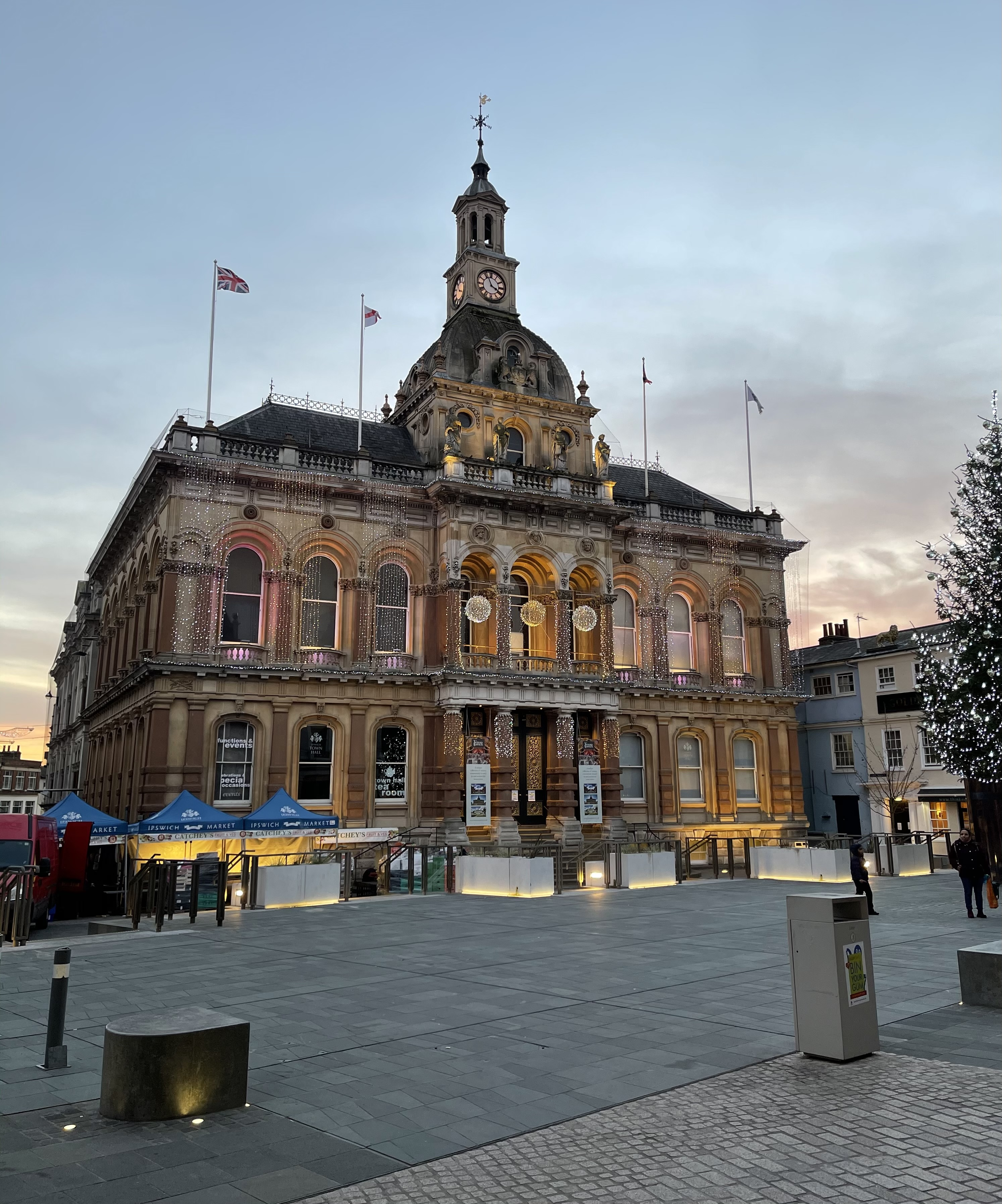
- Ipswich Town Hall as seen from Tavern Street

- Shown in Suffolk
- 52.0577°N 1.1525°E
- Location: Ipswich

History
- Built: 1868

Site notes
- Architect: Bellamy and Hardy
- Architectural style: Italianate style

Listed Building – Grade II
- Designated: 4 August 1972
- Reference no.: 1206572

Ipswich Town Hall is a municipal building in Ipswich, in the county of Suffolk, England. It is a Grade II listed building. It is used for meetings of Ipswich Borough Council and also serves as an events venue and art gallery.

== History ==
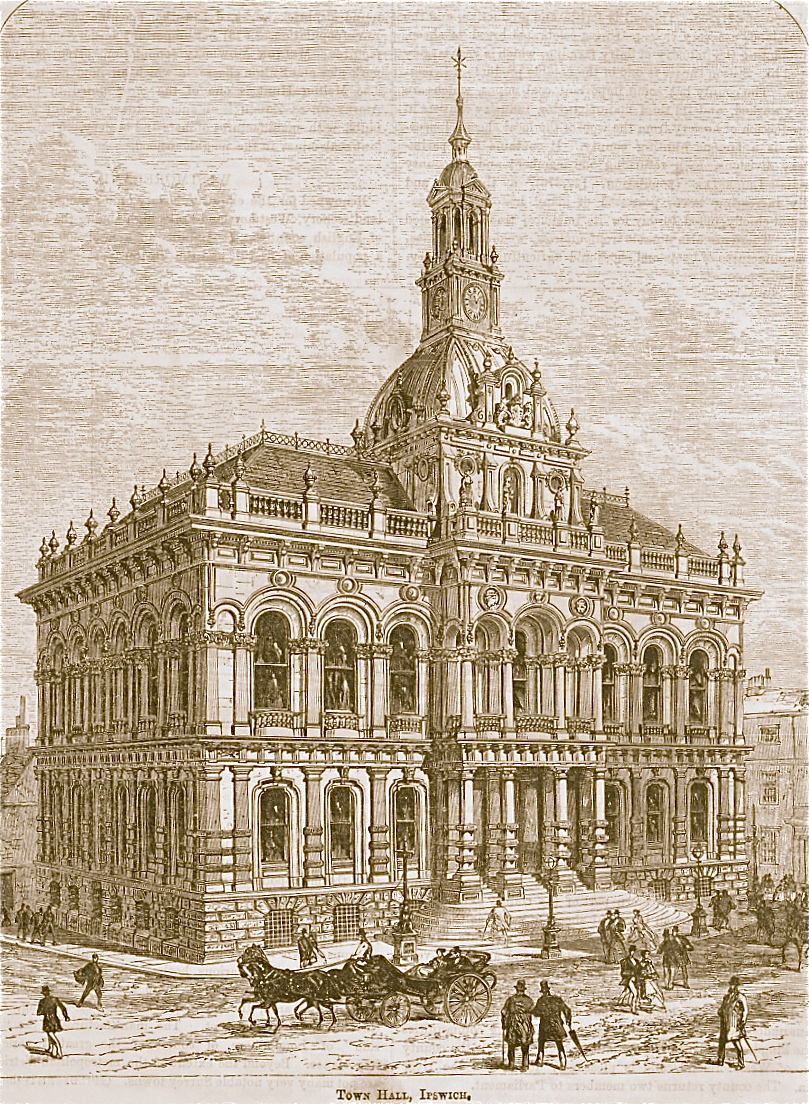
Ipswich Town Hall c. 1867-68

The first town hall had its origins in a chapel dedicated to St Mildrith which had been converted into a civic building by the insertion of an upper floor in the 18th century. This building together with an adjacent building standing to the east of it were remodelled with a new facade in the Paladian style by Benjamin Catt in 1818. The internal alterations to consolidate these two buildings properly into one civic space were not completed until 1842.

The foundation stone for the current building was laid by the mayor, Ebenezer Goddard, on 18 April 1866. The new building was designed by the Lincoln firm of architects Bellamy and Hardy in the Italianate style. It was constructed on the site of the old town hall at a cost of £16,000 and was opened by John Patteson Cobbold, the then mayor, in 1868.

An Ipswich Society blue plaque was installed on the Town Hall in 2016 commemorating Mary Whitmore, the first woman to be Mayor of Ipswich, in 1946.

The council built itself a new civic centre on Civic Drive in 1970 to serve as its main offices, but continued to use the town hall for full council meetings. The civic centre was in turn replaced in 2006 when the council moved to Grafton House. The town hall continues to be used for full council meetings and also includes the council's customer service centre.

== Design ==
The building is built in a grand Italianate style with the figure heads of King Richard I, Cardinal Thomas Wolsey and King John decorating the front wall. King Richard I promised the town its first charter but died before it was granted, King John granted the town's charter and Cardinal Wolsey was born and educated in Ipswich. Sitting above the figure heads are four statues representing Commerce, Agriculture, Law and Order and Justice. Placed on the smaller tower sits an open stone work lantern. The tower houses an illuminated four-dial turret striking clock designed by Messrs. Dent of 61 Strand who were the makers of the Big Ben. John Warner & Sons of the Crescent Foundry London, cast the bell that sits in the tower that was made in 1867.

When it opened the town hall included a Council Chamber, a Quarter Sessions Court, a library, committee and retiring rooms, Grand and Petty Jury Rooms and a room for the Magistrates' business. The basement included a police station with seven cells and a parade area, a kitchen, offices and space for the Corporation fire engine and hose to be kept. It was subsequently altered to include two art galleries.

Works of art contained in the building include a bust of the Duke of Wellington by Peter Turnerelli and a bust, in similar style, of Cardinal Thomas Wolsey by an unknown artist.
