= George Sampson (cricketer) =

New Zealand cricketer

Personal information
- Full name: George Hurfitt Sampson
- Born: 7 July 1845; Bell Block, Taranaki, New Zealand
- Died: 17 March 1911 (aged 65); New Plymouth, Taranaki, New Zealand

Domestic team information
- Years: Team
- 1874/75: Otago
- Source: CricInfo, 23 May 2016

George Hurfitt Sampson (7 July 1845 – 17 March 1911) was a New Zealand cricketer. He played one first-class match for Otago during the 1874–75 season.

Sampson was born at Bell Block in Taranaki in 1845, the son of Charles Sampson and his wife Martha (née Gollop) who had emigrated from Dorset in England, arriving in New Zealand in 1842. (Note: CricketArchive and McCarron both give Sampson's father as Henry Sampson, a professional cricketer who played for Yorkshire teams throughout the 1840s and 50s. This appears to be in error.) The family farmed at Bell Block and were forced from their land in 1860 during the First Taranaki War, in which George and his father both served as volunteers in the militia. Sampson continued to serve in a variety of roles in the militia during the Second Taranaki War and Tītokowaru's War later in the decade. He later farmed at Waitara.

Sampson's only first-class match was a January 1875 fixture between Otago and Canterbury. Opening the batting for Otago, he scored a total of 10 runs in the match. He played in a team of 22 for Canterbury against the touring English side led by James Lillywhite during the following season.

Sampson married and had a family of 10 children. He died in hospital at New Plymouth in 1911 aged 65.
