= George Green Sampson =

English physician and politician

George Sampson
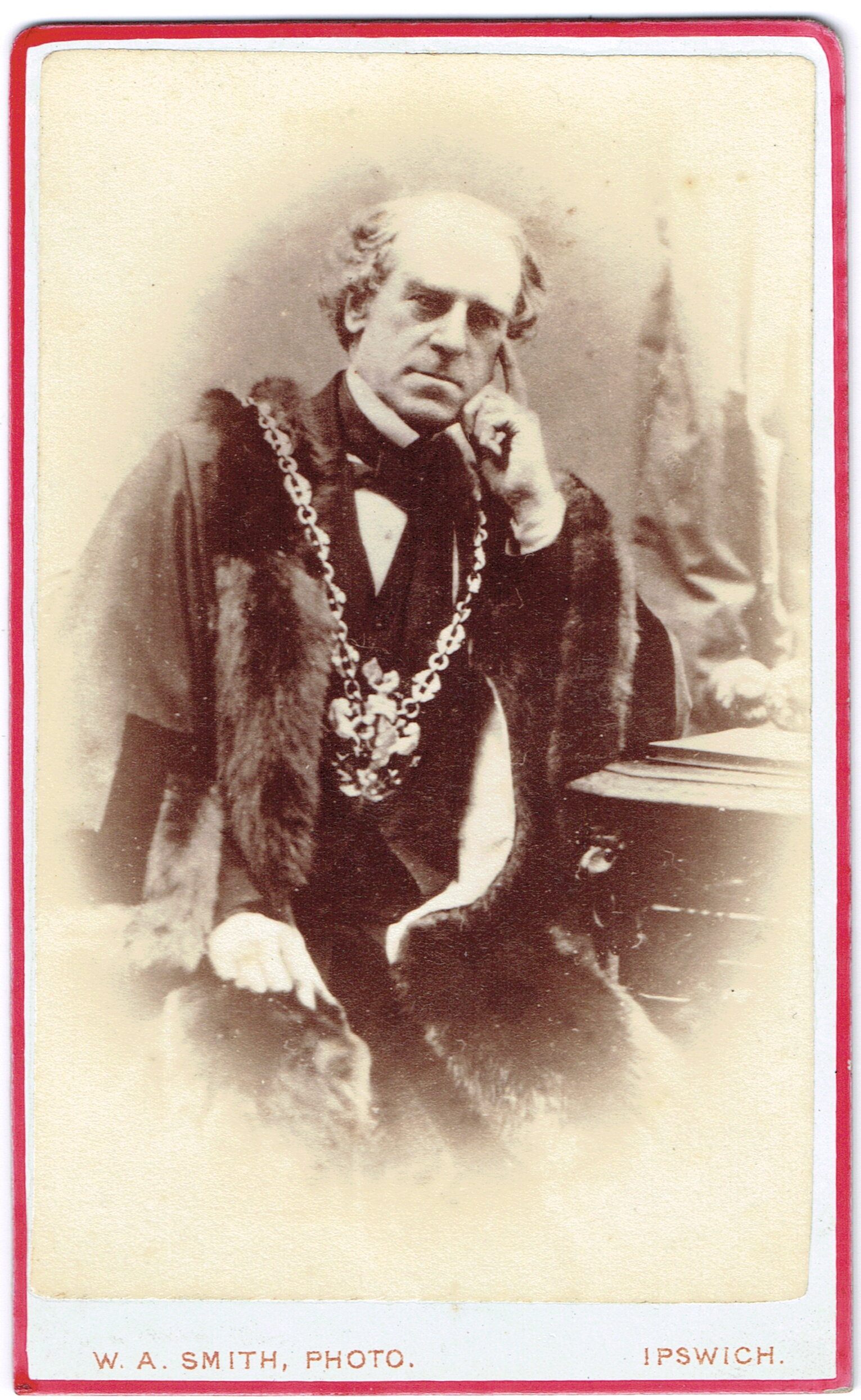
- George Green Sampson, Mayor of Ipswich, c.1871 by Walter Smith
- Born: George Green Sampson; 1804
- Died: 1885 (aged 80–81)
- Occupation: Physician

Mayor of Ipswich
- In office 1838–1839
- In office 1846–1847
- In office 1870–1872

George Green Sampson (1804–1885) was a physician and politician in Ipswich, Suffolk.

In 1819 he was apprenticed to his uncle, John Denny, who was a prominent surgeon in Ipswich with a practice at Tower Ditches known as Denny's Passage. In 1826 he received further training at Guy's Hospital for six months and received his Licentiate of the Society of Apothecaries. In 1827 he became a member of the Royal College of Surgeons. He then purchased the medical practice of William Hamilton in Ipswich for £100.

He was the first Mayor of Ipswich to be elected four times, serving 1838-1839, 1846-1847, 1870-1871 and 1871-1872.

It was in his capacity as mayor of Ipswich that he laid the first stone of Ipswich Docks in 1839. He was responsible for the introduction of the gold chain of office and badge in November 1871.

He was active in the Suffolk Branch of the Provincial Medical and Surgical Association, and in 1844 served on their committee to support Sir James Graham's bill to regulate the medical profession.

The Ipswich Journal's obituary reported that "Dr. Sampson" (as he was known to the poor of Ipswich, who admired him greatly) was a man of impetuous temperament but also intensely kind and sympathetic, although he had no patience for healthy young men whose crooked backs and bent knees contrasted with his own upright figure, maintained well into old age. He died at his home in Ipswich on 27 June 1885.
