= Bailiff of Ipswich =

The title Bailiff of Ipswich was used from 1200 to 1834 for the most senior officers of Ipswich Corporation, the municipal corporation that owned property in and was responsible for the government of Ipswich. Although over 40 English towns had been granted corporate status by 1200, with the granting of the charter, Ipswich became one of the first towns to be granted the privilege of having two bailiffs elected by the inhabitants gathered in common council. The office was abolished with the implementation of the Municipal Corporations Act 1835, after which the most senior civic office in Ipswich was Mayor.

The bailiffs were either portmen or common councillors. They were elected every September along with the town clerk and installed before a partisan dinner at Michaelmas (29 September). Their role included acting as returning officers in elections, particularly UK parliamentary elections. They were also joint trustees of several charities which in the early nineteenth century yielded about £2,000 a year.

== First bailiffs ==
The charter to incorporate the Borough of Ipswich was granted on 25 May 1200. After provisions to found the borough, it further stated:

"Moreover, we desire and grant that the same our burgesses may elect two of the more lawful and discreet men of their town, and present them to our chief justice at our Exchequer, who shall well and faithfully keep the provostship of the aforesaid borough of Ipswich; and that they shall not be removed, as long as they comport themselves well in that bailiwick, except by the common counsel of the aforesaid burgesses."

Further provision was given for the election of four coroners.

The whole community of the town gathered in the churchyard of St Mary-le-Tower where they elected John fitz Norman and William de Beaumes as the two bailiffs. They were also elected as two of four the coroners alongside Philip de Porta, and Roger Lew.

== Prominent Bailiffs of Ipswich ==
- Richard Smart (c. 1507 – 1560)
