= Dykes Alexander (senior) =

Alexander & Co. founder and Quaker Banker from Suffolk, England

Dykes Alexander (1724 – 10 April 1786, Needham Market) was a Suffolk banker active in the Quaker congregation there. He founded the bank Alexander & Co. in Needham Market in 1744.

== Family life ==
Dykes married Martha Biddle on 18 December, 1747 in Kingston upon Thames. She became a Quaker minister in about 1750 and remained active as such until her death in 1775. She was the daughter of John and Abigail Biddle, Quakers in Esher, Surrey. They had nine children:

- Samuel Alexander: 7 October 1749:
- Martha
- 7 February, 1760, Mary
- Sarah
- 14 July 1763: Dykes
- William
- Abigail
- 3 January 1768: William
- Ann
