= George Simpson =

George Simpson may refer to:

== Politicians and officeholders ==
=== Australia ===
- George Simpson (Queensland politician) (1849–1919), member of the Parliament of Queensland
- George Simpson (Western Australian politician) (1856–1906), member of the Legislative Assembly of Western Australia
- George Bowen Simpson (1838–1915), politician and judge in New South Wales, Australia

=== Canada ===
- Sir George Simpson (HBC administrator) (1792–1860), Scottish explorer of Canada, governor of Rupert's Land
  - Sir George Simpson (condominiums), Montreal, Quebec, Canada
- George Simpson (Canadian politician) (1858–1906), politician in Prince Edward Island, Canada

=== United States ===
- George L. Simpson (died 1907), American politician from Virginia
- George W. Simpson (1870–1951), New York politician and judge

== Sport ==
- George Simpson (footballer, born 1876) (1876–1955), English football player for Doncaster Rovers and Chesterfield
- George Simpson (footballer, born 1883) (1883–?), English footballer for Sheffield Wednesday and West Bromwich Albion
- George Simpson (footballer, born 1933) (1933–2012), English football player for Mansfield Town and Gillingham
- George Simpson (golfer) (1887–1920), Scottish professional golfer
- George Simpson (sprinter) (1908–1961), American runner

== Others ==
- Sir George Simpson (meteorologist) (1878–1965), meteorologist for Robert Falcon Scott's Antarctic expedition
- George Simpson (botanist) (1880–1952), New Zealand botanist
- George Simpson (Royal Navy officer) (1901–1972), British admiral
- George Gaylord Simpson (1902–1984), American paleontologist
- George Simpson, Baron Simpson of Dunkeld (born 1942), British businessman
- George Buchan Simpson (1820–1892), Scottish art collector, connoisseur and patron of Scottish painters
- George Freeland Barbour Simpson (1874–1958), Scottish physician and gynaecologist
- George Goodman Simpson (1896–1990), Australian flying ace

== See also ==
- George Simson (1767–1848), MP
