= Daniel Poole Goddard =

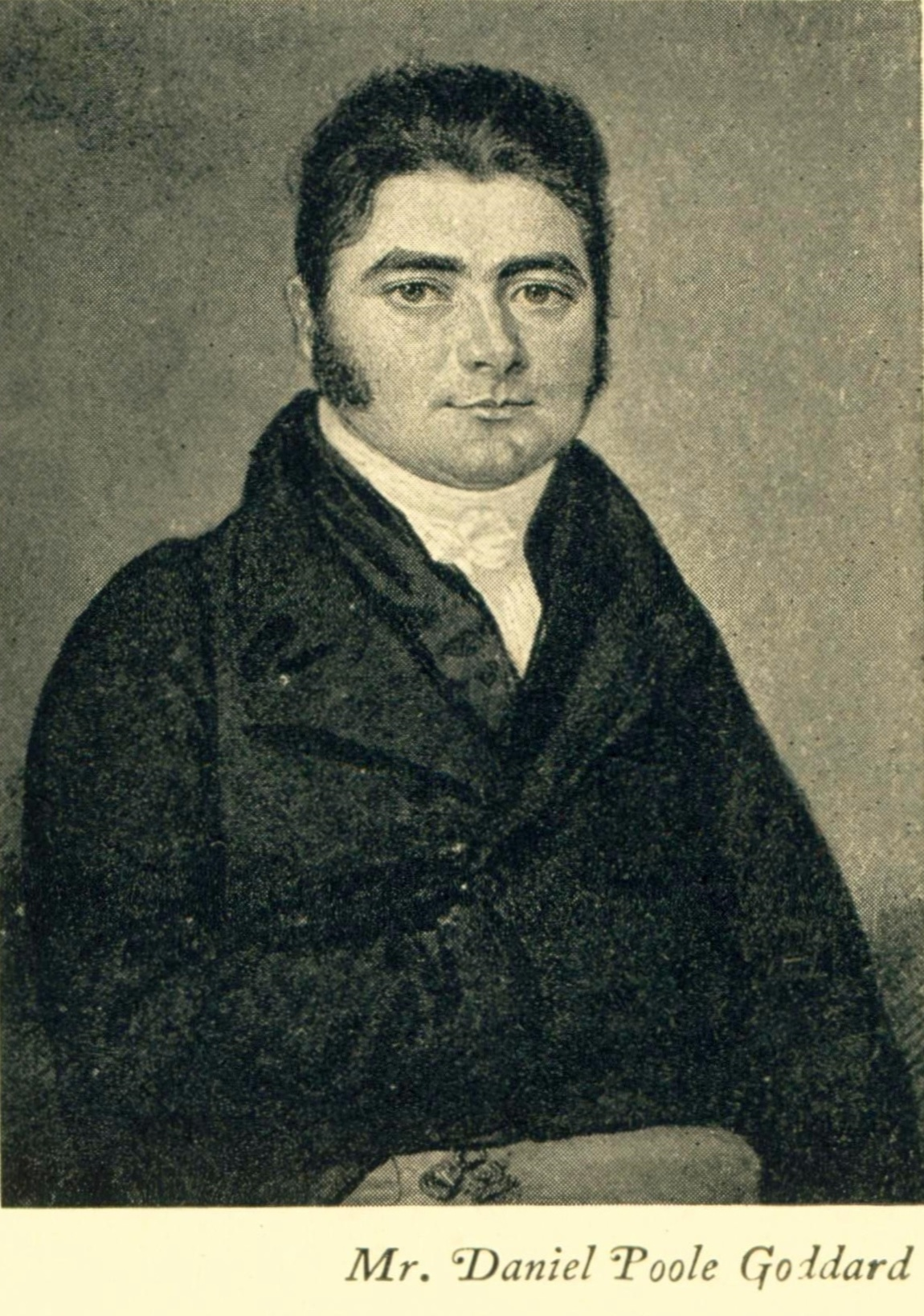

Daniel Poole Goddard (1783-1842) was a brewer in Ipswich who subsequently played a major role in the early development of the Ipswich Gas Company for whom he served as secretary and engineer.

Daniel was born in Stepney, London, and baptised at the Bull Lane Independent Church there on 15 December 1783. He was the only one of 23 children to reach the age of maturity and his mother died when he was three. He was sent to school at Framlingham in Suffolk and spent the holidays with his grandfather at Rendham. In 1806 he was in Ipswich where he married Lucy Haill at St Mary le Tower on 14 August. In 1830 he is recorded as being a brewer living in Orwell Place.
