= List of mayors of Ipswich Borough, Suffolk =

Ipswich was created a Borough in 1200 by charter of King John.

Prior to 1835, the officers of Ipswich Corporation, at various times, consisted of:

- Two bailiffs
- The high steward
- Coroner
- Twelve portmen
- Twenty-four common council of headboroughs
- An indefinite number of burgesses or freemen
- A recorder
- A town clerk
- Chamberlains
- A water bailiff
- A treasurer
- Clavigers (record keepers who held the keys to the miniment chest)
- Sergeants-at-mace

== Municipal Borough of Ipswich ==
The Municipal Corporations Act 1835 created the Municipal Borough of Ipswich. Following this Act, a mayor was elected, together with a High Steward, Recorder, ten Aldermen and thirty councillors. The mayors were as follows: William Vick published an album, The Mayors of Ipswich from 1835 to 1890 in 1890.

Date	Name	Image	Party	Notes	Refs
1836	Benjamin Brame		Ipswich Yellow Party/Whig		
1836-37	Frederick Francis Seekamp		Whig		
1837-38	Peter Bartholomew Long			Physician	
1838-39	George Green Sampson			Physician	
1839-40	John May (senior)				
1840-41	Peter Bartholomew Long				2nd term
1841-1842	John Chevallier Cobbold		Conservative		
1842-1843	George Josselyn		Conservative		
1843-1844	William May		Conservative		

- 1844-1845 William Rodwell
- 1845-1846 Thomas d'Eye Burroughes
- 1846-1847 George Green Sampson
- 1847-1848 John May (senior)
- 1848-1849 Charles Burton
- 1849-1850 Thomas Baldock Ross
- 1850-1851 Peter Bartholomew Long
- 1851-1852 George Josselyn
- 1852-1853 Samuel Harrison Cowell
- 1853-1854 Charles Foote Gower
- 1854-1855 Peter Bartholomew Long
- 1855-1856 George Christopherson
- 1856-1857 George Christopherson
- 1857-1858 Ebenezer Goddard
- 1858-1859 Jeremiah Head
- 1859-1860 George Josselyn
- 1860-1861 Edward Grimwade
- 1862-1863 George Bacon
- 1864-1865 Samuel Harrison Cowell
- 1865-1866 Ebenezer Goddard
- 1866-1867 Robert Charles Ransome
- 1867-1868 John Patteson Cobbold
- 1868-1869 Edward Packard (senior)
- 1869-1870 Edward Grimwade
- 1870-1871 George Green Sampson
- 1871-1872 George Green Sampson
- 1872-1873 Ebenezer Goddard
- 1873-1875 Dr Barrington Chevallier
- 1875-1876 George Calver Mason
- 1876-1877 Walter Turner
- 1877-1878 Charles Henry Cowell
- 1878-1879 Alexander Francis Nicholson
- 1879-1880 David Henry Booth
- 1880-1881 Alfred Wrinch
- 1881-1882 Frederick Fish
- 1882-1883 Edward Rush Turner
- 1883 John May Jnr
- 1884-1885 Sterling Westhorp
- 1885-1886 Benjamin Page Grimsey
- 1886-1887 Edward Packard (junior)
- 1887-1888 Robert Maplestone Miller
- 1888-1889 John Henry Josselyn

== County Borough of Ipswich ==
Following the enactment of the Local Government Act 1888 the County Borough of Ipswich was created with the rest of Suffolk being divided into the administrative counties of East and West Suffolk. The County Borough of Ipswich had the following mayors:

- 1889-1890 Nathaniel Catchpole
- 1890-1891 Frederick Turner
- 1891-1892 Sir Daniel Ford Goddard
- 1892-1893 Roderick Donald Fraser
- 1893-1894 Samuel Richard Anness
- 1894-1895 John Henry Bartlet
- 1895-1896 George Francis Josselyn
- 1896-1897 Felix Thornley Cobbold
- 1897-1898 Robert Stocker Paul
- 1898-1899 Edwin Perkins Ridley
- 1899-1900 William Churchman
- 1900-1901 William Fraser Paul
- 1901-1902 Arthur Churchman
- 1902-1903 William John Catchpole
- 1903-1904 Frederick Bennett
- 1904-1905 John Henry Grimwade
- 1905-1906 Bunnell H Burton
- 1906-1907 William Orford White
- 1907-1908 Harry W Raffe
- 1908-1909 Francis Charles Ward
- 1909-1910 Alexander Gibb
- 1910-1911 Peter Wyndham Cobbold
- 1911-1912 Frederick Edward Rands
- 1912-1913 Edward Colby Ransome
- 1913-1914 William Pipe
- 1914-1915 John Dupuis Cobbold
- 1915-1916 Sydney Brand
- 1916-1917 Valentine Desborough Colchester
- 1917-1918 Henry Dixon Phillips
- 1918-1919 Edward Colby Ransome
- 1919-1920 Frederick Edward Rands
- 1920-1921 Frank John Mason
- 1921-1922 William Pipe
- 1922-1923 Alfred Sizer
- 1923-1924 John Richard Staddon
- 1924-1925 Frederick William Turner
- 1925-1926 Kavas Jamas Badshah
- 1926-1927 Charles Ernest Tempest
- 1927-1928 William Rowley Elliston
- 1928-1929 James Francis Clark Hossack
- 1929-1930 Arthur Lewis Clouting
- 1930-1931 Sidney Charles Grimwade
- 1931-1933 George William Senton
- 1933-1934 Robert Frederick Jackson
- 1934-1935 George Ambrose Mallett
- 1935-1936 Hubert Ernest Holland
- 1936-1937 Albert Victor Smith
- 1937-1938 George Underwood
- 1938-1939 Edward Lawrence Hunt
- 1940-1941 Robert Frederick Jackson
- 1942 (Nov-Dec) Frank John Mason
- 1942-1943 (Dec-Nov) Owen Dudley Phillips
- 1943-1944 Charles West English
- 1944-1945 Sidney Charles Grimwade
- 1945-1946 Frederick Henry Warner
- 1946-1947 Mary Whitmore
- 1947-1949 James Barry Cullingham
- 1949-1950 Arthur James Cook
- 1950-1951 Cyril Catchpole
- 1951-1952 Albert John Colthorpe
- 1952-1953 James Chalmers
- 1953-1954 Lesley Lewis
- 1954-1955 Clifford Gerald Roper
- 1955-1956 Christopher Gorden Rushen
- 1956-1957 Phineas Weiner Lewis
- 1957-1958 Robert Ratcliffe
- 1958-1959 George William Pipe
- 1959-1960 Richard James Lewis
- 1960-1961 Percy John Fowler
- 1961-1962 Charlotte Green
- 1962-1963 Arthur Vernon Bishop
- 1963-1964 John McClennan Stewart
- 1964-1965 Edward Charles Grimwade
- 1965-1966 Victor Robert Redvers Francis
- 1966-1967 Marjory Keeble
- 1967-1968 Arthur J Lambert
- 1968-1969 Owen Sturly Nunn / Mrs Marjorie J Nesby
- 1969-1970 Samuel William Teagar Godward
- 1970-1971 Wallace Mortimer Morfey
- 1971-1972 Cyril George Skinner
- 1972-1973 Walter Horace Mulley
- 1973-1974 Ruby Ann Skerritt
- 1974-1975 Arthur J Lambert
- 1975-1976 Beryl James
- 1976-1977 Hugh R Davis
- 1977-1978 David Myer
- 1978-1979 Alan Seabrooke
- 1979-1980 Eric Grant
- 1980-1981 Sydney Mason
- 1981-1982 Ann Smith
- 1982-1983 Beryl James
- 1983-1984 Douglas Grimwood
- 1984-1985 Peter K Gardiner
- 1985-1986 Eric Grant
- 1986-1987 Gillian Auton*
- 1987-1988 Derek Warsop
- 1988-1989 William A Quinton
- 1989-1990 Sheila Baguley
- 1990-1991 Jack West
- 1991-1992 Kenneth Wilson
- 1992-1993 Joan Cubbin
- 1993-1994 Margaret Alderton
- 1994-1995 Ian Roderick Grimwood
- 1995-1996 Albert W Grant
- 1996-1997 Philip H L Smart
- 1997-1998 Jeannette E Macartney
- 1998-1999 George Hamilton Clarke
- 1999-2000 John Charles Mowles
- 2000-2001 Don Edwards
- 2001-2002 Maureen Carrington-Brown
- 2002-2003 Richard Risebrow
- 2003-2004 Penelope Kathryn Breakwell
- 2004-2005 Roger Edwin Fern
- 2005-2006 William George Wright
- 2006-2007 Henry George Davies
- 2007-2008 Inga Elisabeth Lockington
- 2008-2009 David Hale
- 2009-2010 David Goldsmith
- 2010-2011 Jane Chambers
- 2011-2012 John Le Grys
- 2012-2013 Mary Blake
- 2013-2014 Hamil Clarke
- 2014-2015 Bill Quinton
- 2015-2016 Glen Chisholm
- 2016-2017 Roger Fern
- 2017-2018 Sarah Barber
- 2018-2019 Jane Riley
- 2019-2021 Jan Parry**
- 2021 Jane Riley***
- 2021-2022 Elizabeth Hughes
- 2022-2023 John Cook
- 2023-2024 Lynne Mortimer
- 2024-2025 Elango Elavalakan
- 2025-2026 Stefan Long
- 2026-2027 Pat Bruce-Browne

== Notes ==
- Mother of Jan Parry, later mayor 2019-2021
  - Jan Parry was elected Mayor at the annual council meeting in May 2019. Owing to the COVID-19 pandemic she agreed to carry on for a further municipal year. However, she stepped down from the council at the end of January 2021 for family reasons. She was the first mayor who was also the daughter of a former mayor.
  - Former Mayor Jane Riley was elected Mayor in February 2021 on an interim basis, and was succeeded by Elizabeth Hughes at annual council meeting in May 2021.
