= Ipswich Society of Professional & Amateur Artists =

Arts organization based in England, the United Kingdom

The Ipswich Society of Professional & Amateur Artists was an organisation founded in 1832 by Henry Davy in Ipswich, Suffolk.
