= Dykes Alexander (junior) =

Banker and Quaker minister

Dykes Alexander (14 July 1763, Needham Market – 27 February 1849, Ipswich) was a banker and Quaker minister in Ipswich, Suffolk.

He was the son of Dykes Alexander (senior) and Martha Biddle. He married Hannah Brewster, the daughter of Richard Brewster and Catherine Peckover on the 5 July 1786. He bought some land in St Mary Stoke, Ipswich in 1808, but sold this to his cousin Samuel Alexander in 1809. Samuel built Goldrood House there, wherein Dykes subsequently lived.

Dykes Alexander was the first chairman of the Ipswich Gas Company.

On 2 November 1848, whilst visiting Thomas Fox in Rushmere, Ipswich, when he mistook a door to the cellar for the door to the drawing room. He fell down the stone staircase and sustained serious injuries. Already by 17 November there was concern that these may prove fatal. He died on 27 February 1849.

== Family ==
Dykes and Hannah Alexander had seven children including:

- Catherine Alexander (1787-1849) married Thomas Fox
- Richard Dykes Alexander (1788-1865)
- Henry Alexander(1789-1838)
- Hannah (1793-)
- Priscilla (1805-1883), married Algernon Peckover, with whom she had eight children including Alexander Peckover, 1st Baron Peckover and Priscilla Hannah Peckover.
