= Claviger (title) =

Medieval title

A claviger was the title of an office-holder found in many medieval boroughs, cities and other organisations. The term means key holder, which is derived from clavis + gerere (key + to carry). The office was retained in many localities in England and Wales until the municipal reforms instituted by the Municipal Corporations Act 1835.
