= Samuel Alexander (banker) =

- Born: June 16, 1773; Needham Market, England
- Died: May 3, 1838 (aged 64); Ipswich
- Occupation: Banker
- Known for: An Alderman with Ipswich Corporation
- Family: Gurney family

Samuel Alexander (16 June 1773 Needham Market - 3 May 1838, Ipswich) was a prominent banker based in Ipswich, Suffolk. He was the son of Samuel Alexander (1749-1824) and Elizabeth Gurney (1747-1786), of the Gurney quaker banking family of Norwich.

Samuel was active in local politics in Ipswich. He was an Alderman with Ipswich Corporation.

His funeral was attended by his relative, Elizabeth Fry (née Gurney), and involved a procession as described in the Suffolk Chronicle:

“... hearse was preceded by about 80 gentlemen of Ipswich, headed by the Mayor and Magistrates, who walked two and two from the churchyard of St.Mary Stoke, through St. Peter's, St. Nicholas’ and St. Matthew’s Street until they arrived at the extremity of the town, when they filed off on each side of the road so as form an avenue ..."
