= Henry Davy =

English landscape painter

Henry Davy (1793–1865) was an English landscape painter, engraver and lithographer active in East Anglia.

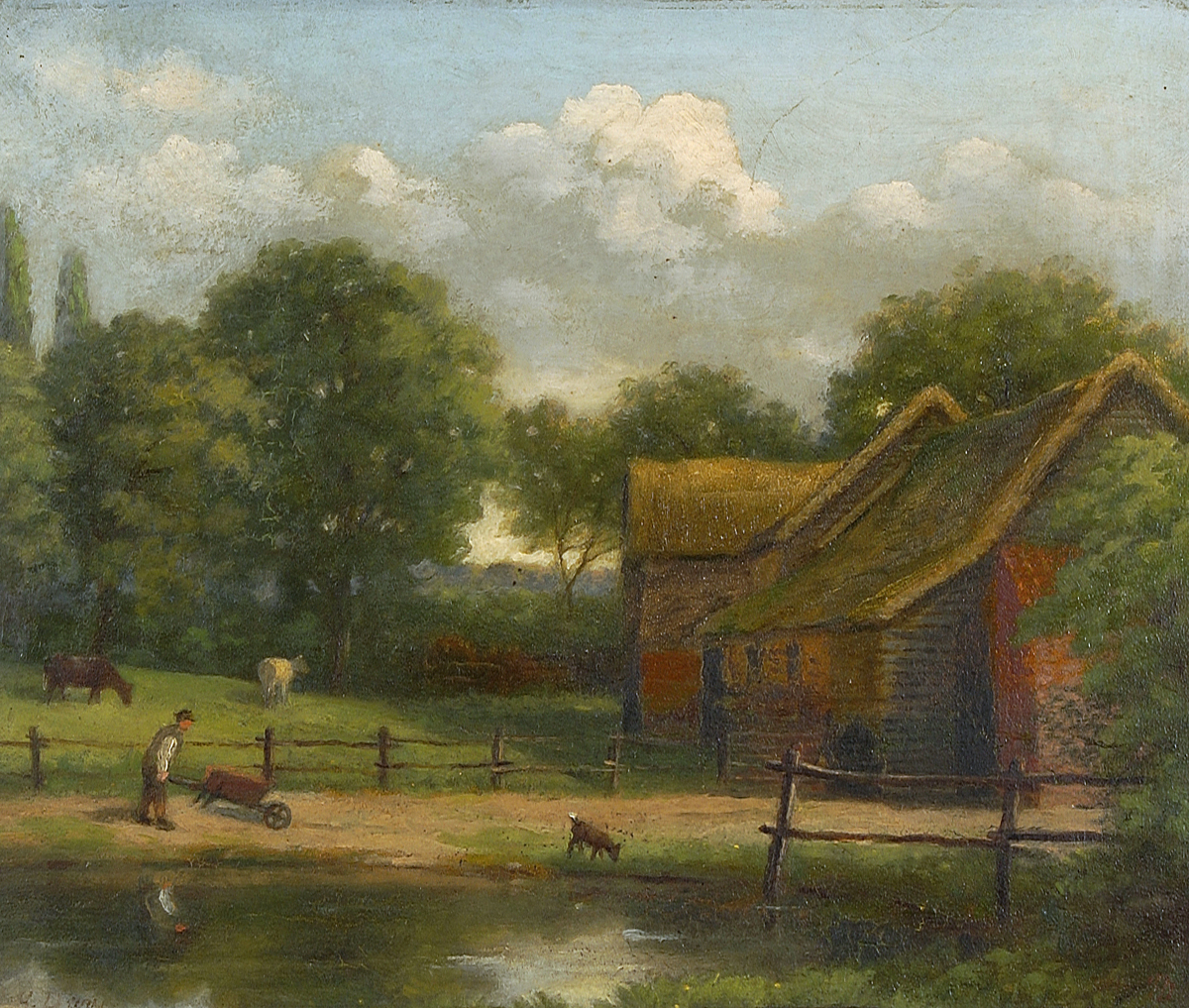
Seventeenth-Century Barn by Henry Davy

Davy was born on 30 May 1793 in The Poplars, which is now Birketts Farm, on Westhall Common, near Halesworth, Suffolk. He was the tenth and youngest child in his family. His father, Thomas Davy, was a farmer. His mother, Sarah, was Thomas's second wife. She was the eldest daughter of William Gibson, surgeon of Carlton Colville and Willingham Hall, Beccles, Suffolk.

Early in life, Davy was apprenticed to a grocer at Halesworth, but his creative yearnings got the better of him and he left his apprenticeship to pursue drawing. Instead he became apprenticed to John Sell Cotman at Great Yarmouth, and assisted him in the etching of his Norfolk architectural views and illustrations of monumental brasses, published in 1818 and 1819. With this experience he issued his series of ten etchings of Suffolk Antiquities including details of Beccles church, in 1818.

In 1824 he married Sarah Bardwell, daughter of a master mariner in Southwold. Until 1829 he lived and worked in Southwold as an instructor in drawing and sketching from nature, and in the production of his watercolours and etchings. Between 1823 and 1827 he issued a Collection of sixty etchings of further Suffolk Antiquities in parts, and these were re-issued (printed by Deck, in Ipswich) together with the earlier ten as A Series of Etchings Illustrative of the Architectural Antiquities of Suffolk in 1827. By this date he had also produced a series of Views of the Seats of Noblemen and Gentlemen in Suffolk which contained only twenty plates, because, although many had subscribed, the funds contributed were not very large.

In 1829 Davy moved to Ipswich and soon settled in Globe Street (now renamed St George's Street), from which address the large body of his subsequent etchings down to the 1860s were usually dated. His first years in Ipswich were difficult, and in 1833 he sold many of his books, plates and other possessions by auction. His later etchings, by which he is best known, were in general issued and sold individually. His preparations for them, at first showing particular attention to Suffolk churches, included a copious body of sketches, from which he distilled a mass of detail for the preparation of his plates. During the late 1830s and 1840s he also produced journalistic illustrations of public events – such as the Laying of the First Stone of Ipswich Docks (1839) – as well as making drawings of farming and agricultural subjects, and of archaeological finds.

== Works ==
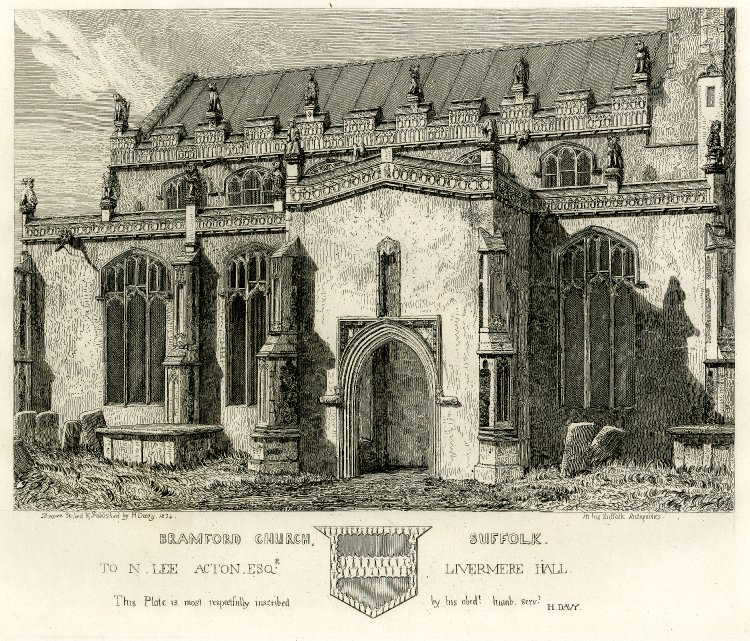
Bramford Church, Suffolk, by Henry Davy

Davy published at Southwold in 1818 and 1827 sets of etchings illustrating the antiquities of Suffolk and the noblemen's seats in the county. He also exhibited three landscape paintings in 1829 in the Suffolk Street exhibition of the Society of British Artists. His works are:

- A Set of ten Etchings illustrative of Beccles Church, and other Suffolk Antiquities, 1818.
- Series of Etchings illustrative of the Architectural Antiquities of Suffolk, accompanied with a Historical Index, drawn and etched by Henry Davy, Southwold, 1827.
- Views of the Seats of the Noblemen and Gentlemen in Suffolk, from drawings by Henry Davy, Southwold, 1827.

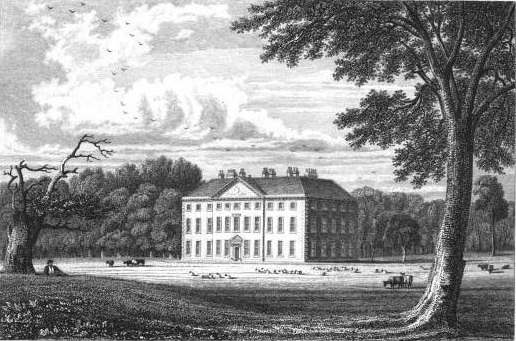
Benacre Hall

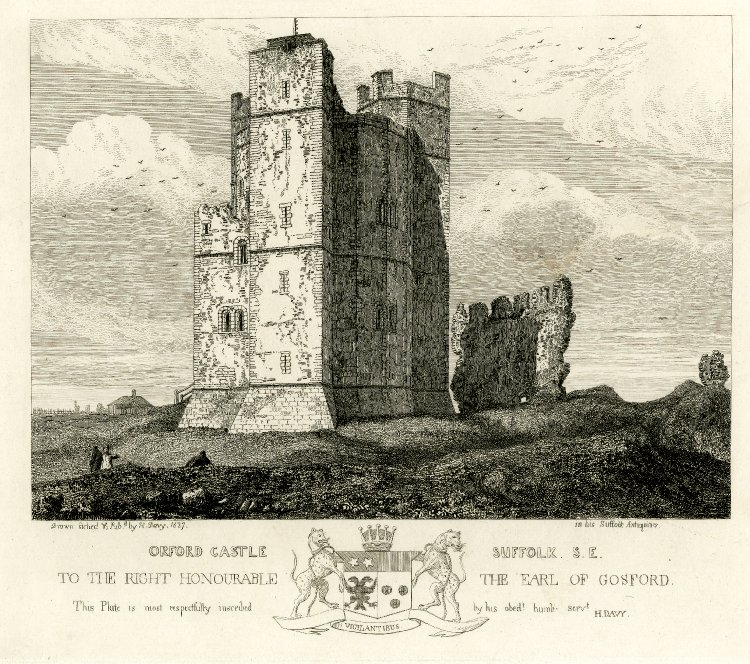
Davy's drawing of the south-east face of the Orford Castle, Suffolk.

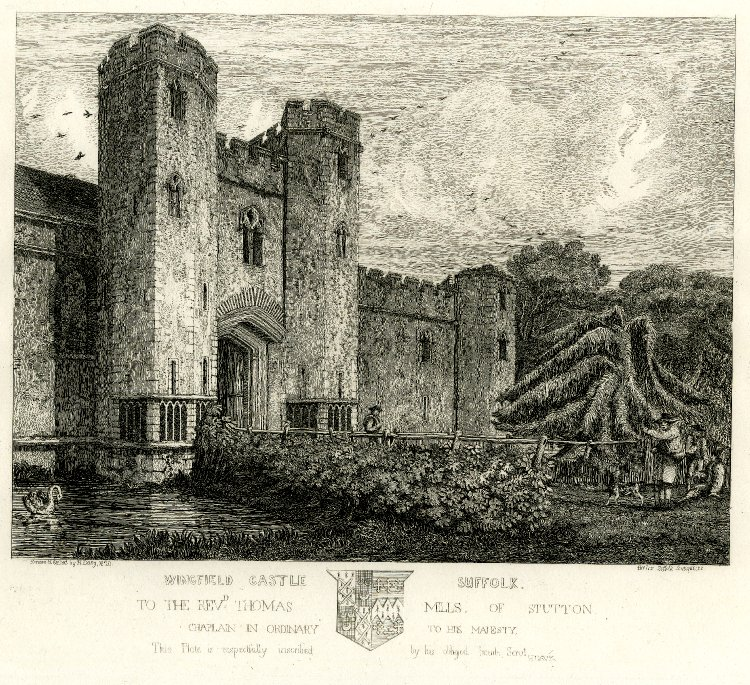
Etching of Wingfield Castle, Suffolk.

== Notes ==
Attribution

This article incorporates text from a publication now in the public domain: Stephen, Leslie, ed. (1888). "Davy, Henry". Dictionary of National Biography. Vol. 14. London: Smith, Elder & Co.
