= John Speed's Ipswich =

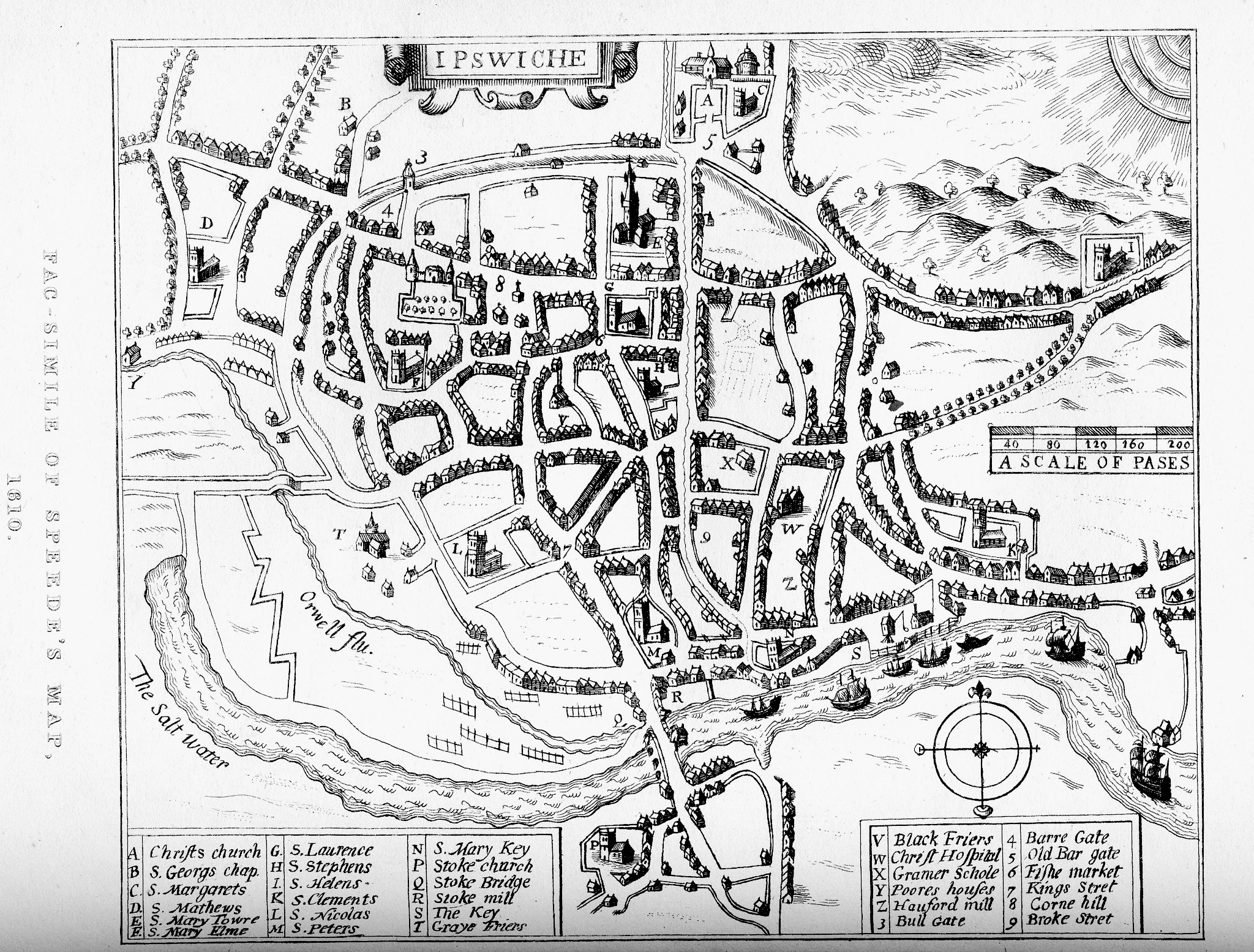
A facsimile of Speed's map was published in 1850 in John Wodderspoon's Memorials of the Ancient Town of Ipswich

John Speed's Ipswich is a graphic account of the town of Ipswich, Suffolk created by John Speed in conjunction with the Dutch engraver, Jodocus Hondius, in 1610. It was featured as an inset for his map of the county of Suffolk, published in Theatre of The Empire of Great Britaine. It is the earliest extant map of Ipswich and features many buildings of the late medieval period, whilst at the same time showing streets laid out in a grid pattern which has largely been retained into the twenty first century.

== Elements of John Speed's Ipswich ==
John Speed's map contains different key elements:

=== "Orwell flu." ===
The river labelled "Orwell flu." has been known as the River Gipping or Little Gipping.

=== Parish churches ===
Ipswich was divided into four wards, each further subdivided into parishes centred on a parish church, as follows.

Ward			
East	St Clement's (K)	St Mary at the Quay (N)	St Stephen's (H)
West	St Matthew's (D)	St Mary-le-Tower (E)	St Mary at the Elms (F)
North	St Margaret's (C)	St Helen's (I)	St Lawrence's (G)
South	St Peter's (M)	St Nicholas' (L)	

Each ward had a headborough who was the leet officer for the ward.

=== Other religious buildings ===
- Ipswich Greyfriars
- Ipswich Blackfriars

=== Other buildings ===
- Poorhouses (mislabbelled Y, actually Z): These are the Tooley's and Smart's Almshouses. These had been founded in 1550 by Henry Tooley with a further endowment provided by William Smarte (MP) in 1591. They were rebuilt as a whole in 1846.
