= Witherspoon =

Witherspoon may refer to:

- Witherspoon (surname), including a list of people with the name
- John Witherspoon College, in Rapid City, South Dakota, US
- Witherspoon Street School for Colored Children, a former school in Princeton, New Jersey, US
- John Witherspoon Middle School, Princeton, New Jersey, US

== See also ==
- Weatherspoon, a surname
- Wetherspoon (surname)
- Wetherspoons, a British pub company
- Wotherspoon, a surname
- Witherspoon Building, in Philadelphia, Pennsylvania, US
- Witherspoon Cottage, at Saranac Lake, New York, US
- Witherspoon-Hunter House, in York, South Carolina, US
- Witherspoon Institute, a think tank in Princeton, New Jersey, US
- Witherspoon Lodge of Free and Accepted Masons, No. 111, historic building in Mount Dora, Florida, US
- Witherspoon v. Illinois, a US Supreme Court case regarding selection of jurors in capital cases
  - Witherspoon questions, questions asked of prospective jurors in capital cases in the United States
- Miss Witherspoon, a 2006 play by Christopher Durang
