= Alexander Carpenter =

15th-century English religious author

Alexander Carpenter, Latinized as Fabricius (fl. 1429), was the English author of the Destructorium viciorum, a religious work popular in the 15th and 16th centuries. Some published editions of the work bear the author's name as "Alexander Anglus" ("Alexander the Englishman"), but he is further identified in a 1496 edition which states that the work was compiled "a cuiusdam fabri lignarii filio" -- "by a certain son of a worker of wood," i.e., a carpenter's son. This identifier also states that the work was begun in 1429, which rules out authorship by Alexander of Hales (ca. 1185-1245) which had by some scholars been considered a possibility. Alexander Carpenter authored other works, termed Homiliae eruditae ("Learned Sermons"), but they are not at present known.

Carpenter is thought by some to have been a follower of the English theologian John Wycliffe (ca. 1328-1384), but that is disputed.

A copy of Destructorium viciorum was donated by William Smarte to the Town Library of Ipswich. In 1630 this found to be missing and John Allen, the minister at St Mary Quay replaced it. However the original was later found, after which the library had two identical copies.
