= Ipswich Blackfriars =

- Saint Mary, Blackfriars, Ipswich
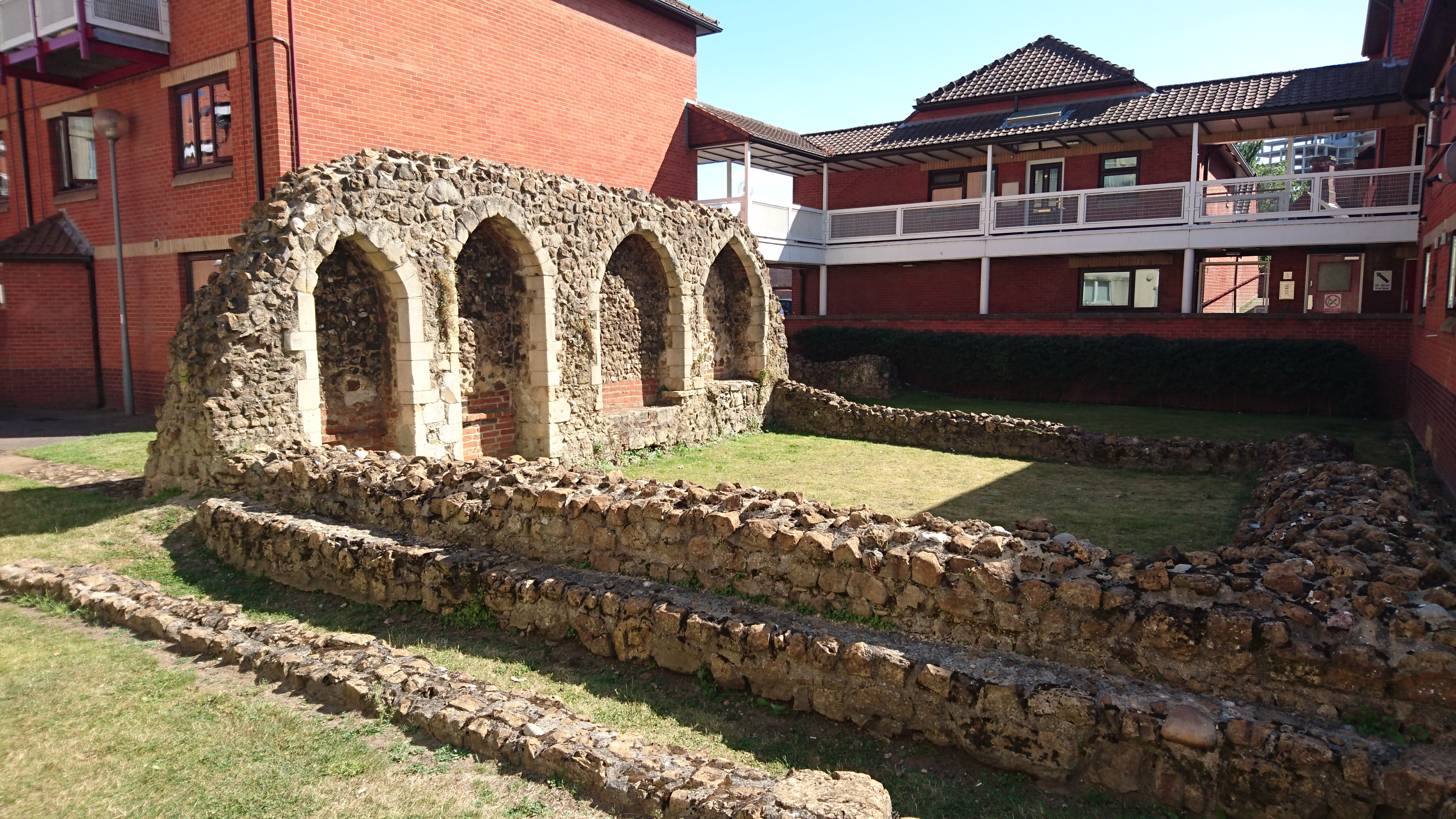
- Remains of St Mary, Blackfriars, Ipswich

- Location in Suffolk
- 52°03′18″N 1°09′30″E
- OS grid reference: TM 16634 44330
- Location: Ipswich, Suffolk
- Country: England
- Denomination: Roman Catholic

History
- Founded: 1263
- Dedication: Saint Mary

Architecture
- Closed: 1538

Ipswich Blackfriars was a medieval religious house of Friars-preachers (Dominicans) in the town of Ipswich, Suffolk, England, founded in 1263 by King Henry III and dissolved in 1538. It was the second of the three mendicant communities established in the town, the first (before 1236) being the Greyfriars, a house of Franciscan Friars Minors, and the third the Ipswich Whitefriars of c. 1278–79. The Blackfriars were under the Visitation of Cambridge.

The Blackfriars church, which was dedicated to St Mary, disappeared within a century after the Dissolution, but the layout of the other conventual buildings, including some of the original structures, survived long enough to be illustrated and planned by Joshua Kirby in 1748. By that time later uses had supervened and their interpretation had become confused. The last of the monastery buildings, the former sacristy, chapter house and dormitory, continued in use as a schoolroom for the Ipswich School until 1842 before finally being demolished in 1849. In 1898 Nina Layard had some success in locating buried footings. A modern understanding of the site emerged during the 1970s and 1980s, through scholarly interpretation and in excavations by the Suffolk County Council team, by which the position of the lost Blackfriars church was recognized and revealed, much of the original plan was clarified or confirmed, and former misapprehensions were corrected.

The site of the Blackfriars church, between Foundation Street and Lower Orwell Street, is preserved as an open grassed recreation area where the footings of the building and a surviving fragment of the wall of the sacristy can be seen, and are explained by interpretative panels. A modern housing development covers the site of the lost conventual buildings.

== Foundation ==
Contrary to earlier antiquarian tradition, in 1887 it was shown decisively that King Henry III established the Dominican friars at Ipswich in 1263. Henry purchased land in Ipswich from Hugh son of Gerard de Langeston and gave it to the friars for them to live there, instructing John de Vallibus (de Vaux), Keeper of the Peace, to go in person to give them seisin. On 26 November 1265 he augmented this grant with other land purchased from the same Hugh. In the same founding phase Robert Kilwardby, who was appointed Provincial prior of the Dominicans in England in 1261 and became Archbishop of Canterbury in 1272, acquired a messuage on behalf of the friars in 1269.

In April 1277 when visiting Ipswich Edward I gave the friars alms for food, and at Michaelmas term 1291 Queen Eleanor's executors gave 100 shillings to the friars preachers of Ipswich, and to 19 other houses. In December 1296 and January following, when in Ipswich for the betrothal of his daughter Elizabeth to the Count of Holland, the King again gave alms.

The old foundation attribution to "Henry de Manesby, Henry Redred and Henry de Landham", or else to "John Hares", arose from the monastic catalogue of John Speed, who in 1614 drew a distinction between a house of Friars Preachers in Ipswich (founded by the three), and the Ipswich Blackfriars (where John Hares "gave ground to build their house larger"). John Weever, 1631, followed Speed's first edition, listing burials for the former and "personages I finde to have beene registred in the Martirologe of this house" (probably benefactors) for the latter. Later authorities saw the distinction was false, and in reality all these supposed founders were later benefactors of the Dominican friars preachers.

== Development ==
Among the names of principal benefactors, which Weever derived from the friars' calendar or martyrology, stood notably Roger Bigod, Earl Marshal, probably referring to the 5th Earl of Norfolk (died 1306). That of Sir Robert de Ufford, Earl of Suffolk (1298–1369), calls to mind the Ufford burials and the Despencer associations at the Ipswich Greyfriars. Sir Richard and Lady Margaret Plays (de Playz, or de Plais) were possibly that 4th Baron de Plaiz (c.1323-1360) of Chelsworth, Suffolk (heir to John de Lancastria) and his wife Margaret, of Weeting Castle in Norfolk, of the founding family of Bromehill Priory of Austin canons, where Sir John de Sutton (another Blackfriars benefactor) succeeded Sir Richard de Playz as patron of the parish advowson. Their granddaughter Margaret married that Sir John Howard who is also named among the benefactors of Blackfriars by Taylor. These were patrons of the late 14th century.

Weever mentions the burial of Adam de Brandeston at Blackfriars, who was sometime M.P. and deputy butler of Ipswich, but was outlawed for felony. His will requesting burial at the friars preachers was proved in December 1362. Gilbert Boulge ("Roulge"), an Ipswich wool merchant buried here, held a fourth part of a knight's fee in Debach in 1380.

Excavation in the priory cemetery revealed about 250 burials, including a man's skeleton from which the right hand had been severed, the wound having healed in his lifetime. The form of the injury indicated violent assault rather than a surgical or judicial amputation, and the victim had sustained other fractures. The unusual pathology suggested identification with Richard de Holebrok, of Tattingstone near Ipswich: in 1327 Richard was attacked at Tattingstone by a large mob led by Benedict, John and William de Braham, who tied him to a tree and cut off his hand. Dame Alice de Holebrok, widow of Sir John, was among the burials observed by Weever at the Ipswich Greyfriars, and should be of this Tattingstone family. Later a Holebrok married a Fastolf: John and Agnes Fastolf, who had tombs at Blackfriars, were probably among the Holebrok descendants who succeeded to their manors at Bentley and Holbrook.

In around 1389 or 1391 it is recorded that a Provincial chapter was celebrated at Ipswich Blackfriars (probably one of many). Not long afterwards a disagreement arose as to who was the rightful prior. In 1397 the Master-general declared in favour of F. John de Stanton (and against F. William), at the same time assigning F. John Sygar as lector, and making other arrangements.

=== The site ===
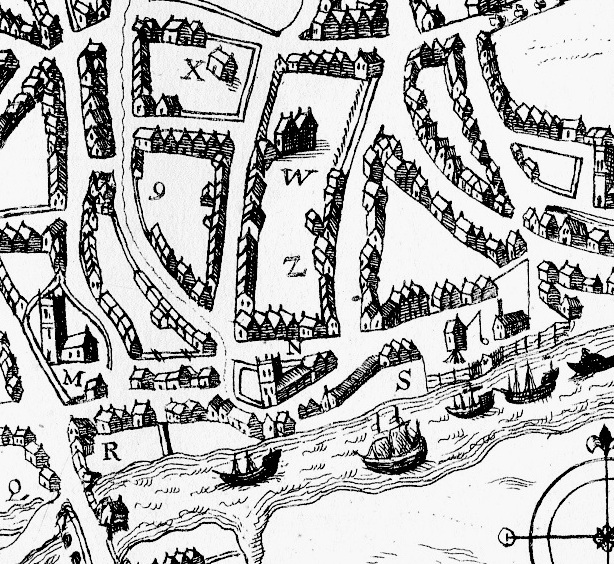
Site of Blackfriars (W) in relation to St Mary-at-Key (N) and St Peter's (M), after John Speed (1610). The church has already gone.

The Ipswich town rampart, reconstructed c.1200 on the line of a Viking-age defence, lay in its south-eastern quarter on the east side of the Blackfriars site within the line of Lower Orwell Street. The priory lands accrued within this sector, with Foundation Street on its west side, and St Mary at Key to the south, within which parish it principally lay. In 1307 Alice Harneis (wife of the leading townsman and coroner Philip Harneis, who led the group for the re-writing of the Town Custumal, and to whom the town Farm was committed), assigned to the friars a plot of 200 ft by 36 ft which she held from Sir Payn de Tibetot, 1st Baron Tibetot (c. 1279–1314), (of the patron family of the Greyfriars). This required a Borough inquisition as it affected a Custom (Hadgavol) reserved to the Crown.

An acre of land on the south side was assigned to the friars in 1334. The pardon granted to the friars in 1346 for 100 feet of land and a ditch acquired without licence from John Harneis (i.e. "John Hares") followed an inquisition stipulating that the townsmen were to have free ingress for maintaining and defending the rampart. The donor was probably Philip's brother John, also prominent in town affairs, whose will was proved in 1323. Similarly a grant made by the whole borough and commonalty in 1349, of a 103 ft plot extending into the middle of the town ditch, carried the proviso that the friars were to maintain the wall (rampart), and also the two great gates to north and south of their court by which the commonalty could have access if necessary. In 1352 three messuages (also yielding Hadgavol) were assigned for enlarging the homestead by Henry de Monessele, Henry Rodbert and Henry Loudham (i.e. "Manesby, Redred and Landham").

=== The priory complex ===
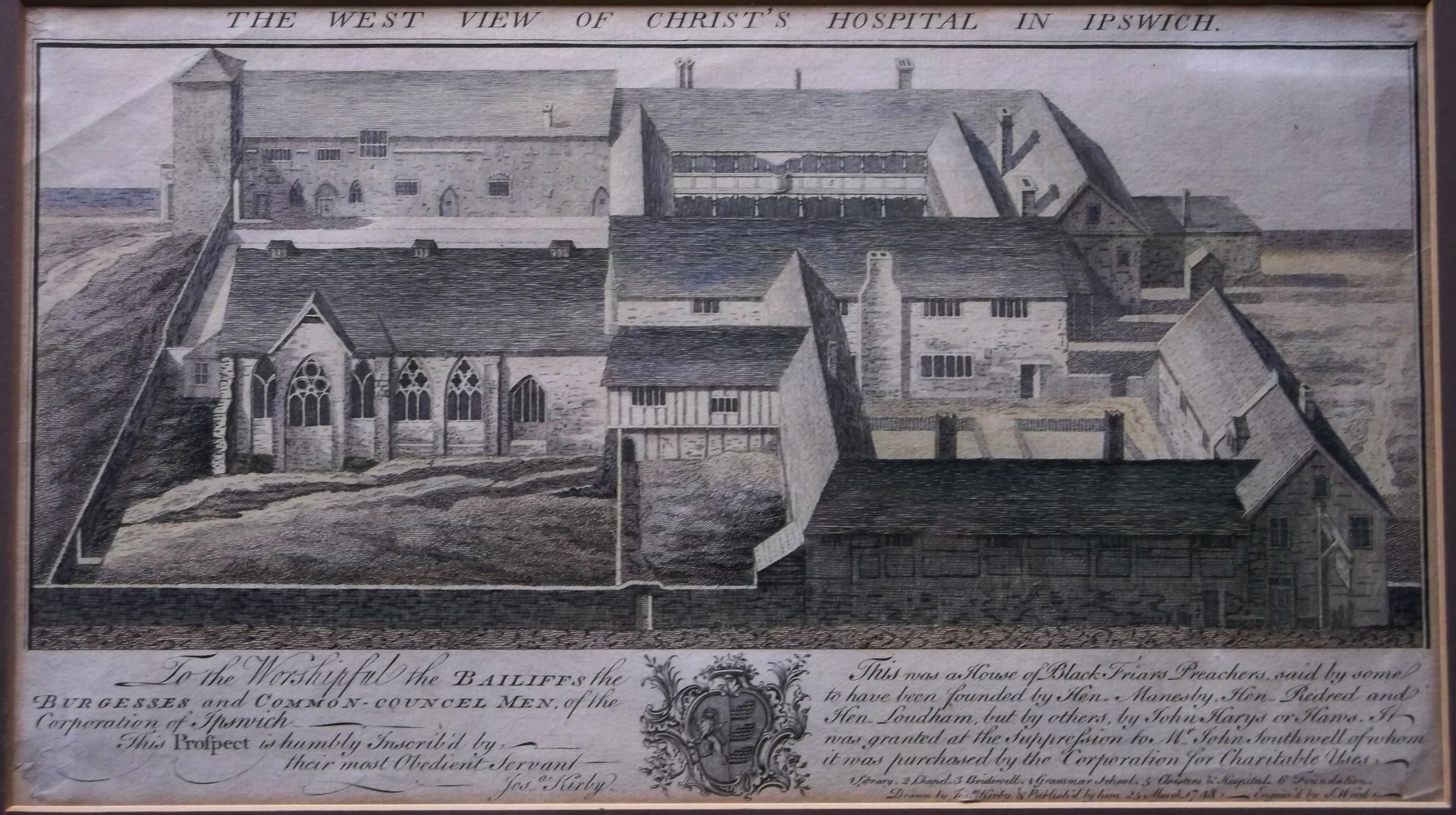
Joshua Kirby's 1748 illustration of buildings on the site of the Ipswich Blackfriars. The Priory Church, already demolished, formerly stood to the left (north) of this group.

Joshua Kirby's 1748 Prospect and Plan of the buildings on the Blackfriars site preserved an important record, but sustained the misapprehension that a medieval structure with tracery windows (left, middle distance, aligned north–south) was the original friary church, that the large hall behind it (upper left) had been the friars' refectory, and that the two-tier galleried courtyard shown to the back right (a post-medieval construction, the Christ's Hospital) stood on the site of the friars' cloister. In a study made in 1976 based upon contemporary understanding of English medieval priory construction, R. Gilyard-Beer observed that the supposed church was in fact the refectory or frater of the former Blackfriars, that the hall shown behind it had contained the sacristy, chapter house and dormitory, and that the courtyard between them was the true site of the friars' cloister.

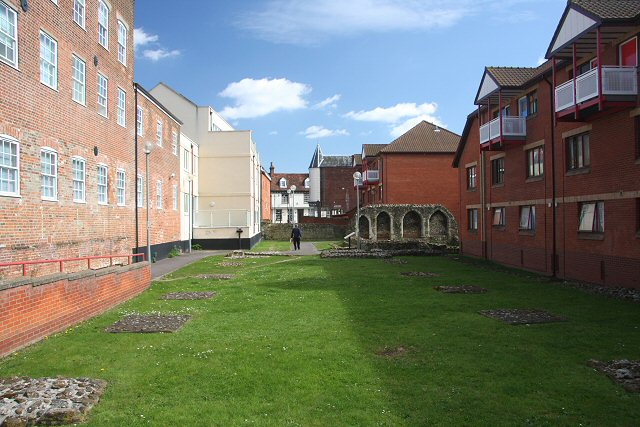
The site of St Mary's church (looking east), which occupied the entire open space between the modern buildings: footings show the piers of the nave arcades

From this it was inferred that the real Blackfriars church had stood directly to the north of these, aligned east and west, its long aisled nave of some 135 ft length and 55 ft breadth forming the north side of the cloister, and the angle at the entry to the choir and sanctuary nesting against the north-west corner of the sacristy. The walking-place for the friars (entering from the cloister passage and crossing the church behind the altar) would have been within the nave structure at its east end, rather than within the choir structure at its west, the more usual arrangement. These deductions were amply confirmed by excavations, which revealed the footprint (now preserved) of a very substantial aisled church extending fully as predicted from the (western) Foundation Street frontage to the unaisled choir (58 ft) ending close to the former rampart in the east, and with the walking-place in the anticipated position.

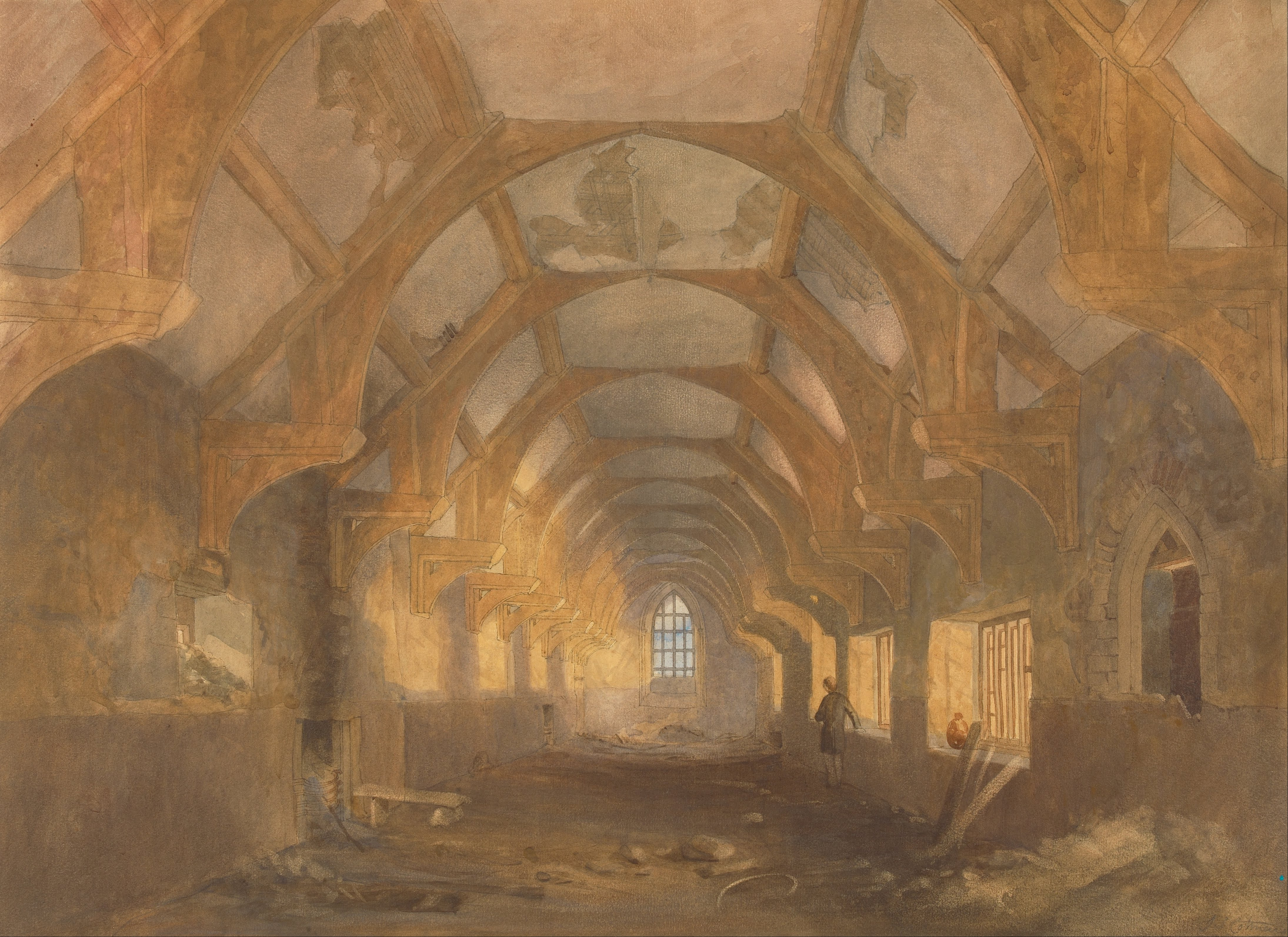
The former Blackfriars dormitory (the Upper Room), looking south, c.1842. Artist: John Sell Cotman

The fragment of standing wall with blocked arches was the lower part of the east wall of the sacristy, and is all that remains of the dormitory/chapter house range demolished in 1849, the upper floor of which was latterly used as a schoolroom. This was about 120 feet long and 24 feet wide. Early 19th century illustrations exist, both interior and exterior. Henry Davy's engraving of 1845–46 shows the frontage with the arched doorway of the chapter-house with pointed windows on either side (as in Kirby's view), and with post-medieval fenestration above, but without the upper string-course shown by Kirby which Gilyard-Beer interpreted as creasing for the roofline of the cloister alley against it. John Sell Cotman's wash drawing of the interior of the upper chamber or dormitory, after the schoolroom use ended in 1842, shows a view looking south, with the wall facing the cloister to the right. The fine hammerbeam roof is thought to have been brought from elsewhere after the Dissolution.

Upon excavation it was found that part of the wall now standing (which appeared to continue across the choir of the church), was a Victorian reconstruction using older materials, and that section was accordingly removed. Other structures stood, or were planned, east of the "dormitory" as early as 1275, for which the proximity of the town ditch may suggest a convenient purpose. Gilyard-Beer considered that a range forming the south side of the cloister had already been lost when Kirby's Prospect was drawn, which must have stood forward upon the open area shown, connecting the dormitory and refectory at their south ends. The free-standing wall seen to the right of Davy's illustration, and in another by F.B. Russel and W. Hagreen, was apparently part of its back wall. He inferred that this may have contained a study-dormitory.

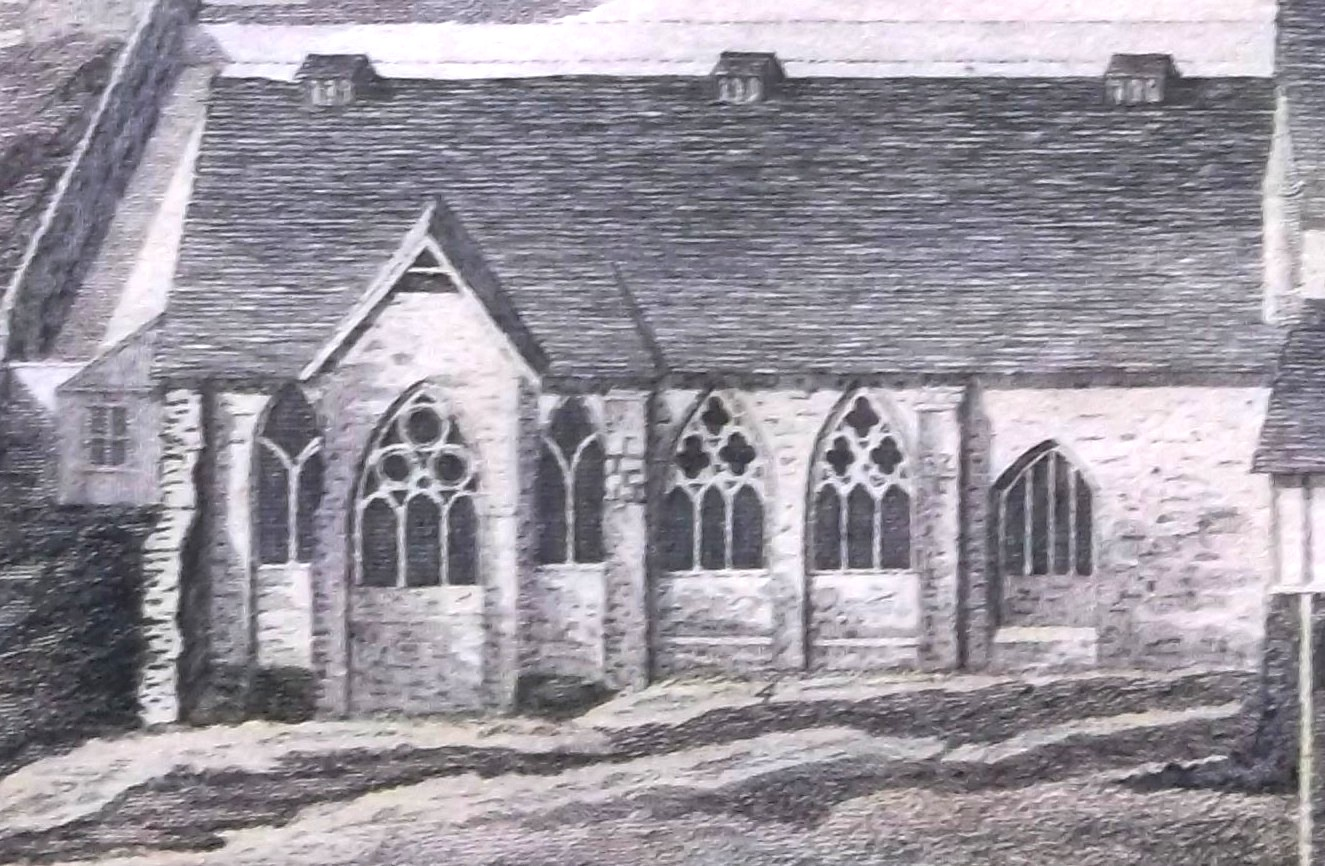
Blackfriars refectory shown by Kirby

Kirby shows the refectory to have had tracery windows in the Decorated Gothic style, progressing from a geometric form at the north end to more curvilinear forms to the south, suggesting a sequence of construction from the late 13th to early 14th century. The final window has perpendicular mullions (a later style). The gable extension at the second window contained the raised lectern from which homilies or scriptures were read at mealtimes and (as Kirby's Plan shows) was approached externally by steps on the south side. The windows are raised to be set above the level of the seated diners. The upper end of this hall was to the north, and the later window and final bay probably mark the position of the screens passage at the lower end giving access to the buttery or pantry. This building was used as a schoolroom until demolished in 1763, when the school moved into the old dormitory. The windows either side of the chapter house doorway were also in curvilinear style.

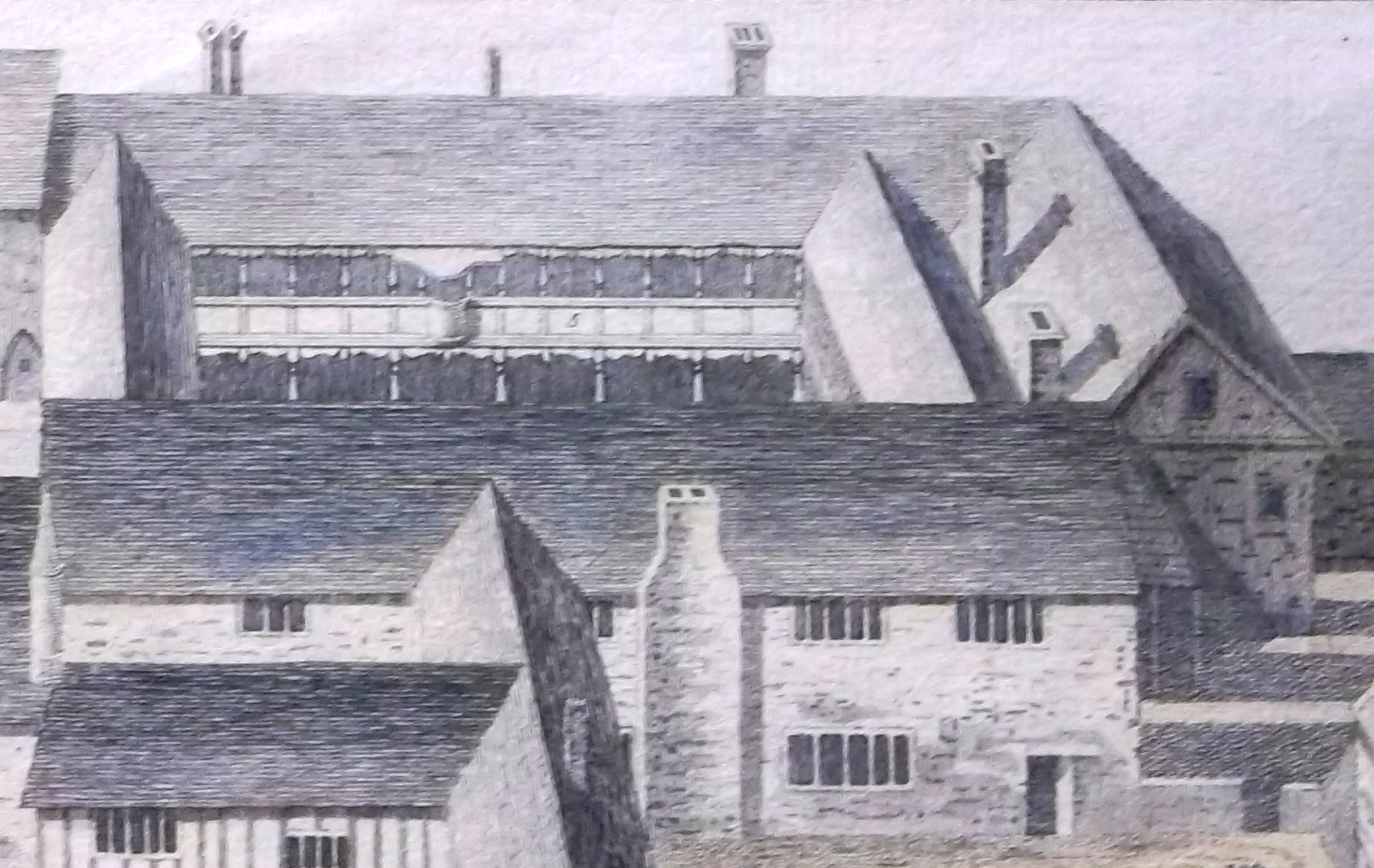
The southern courtyard shown by Kirby, possibly reconstructed on the site of a second cloister, with the suggested Infirmary on the south side

Although excavation revealed little of the more southerly part of the complex, the realization that the priory layout had conformed to an orderly plan, with a very imposing church, encouraged what was necessarily a more speculative interpretation of that part of Kirby's Prospect and Plan. Gilyard-Beer suggested that the two-tiered gallery courtyard then in use as Christ's Hospital, evidently of later construction, had been rebuilt on the plan of an original second cloister which may also have been of two storeys. A large two-storied stone building possibly corresponding to that on the south side of the second cloister was still standing in 1845 and may have been the Infirmary. The buildings at the south-west corner perhaps occupied the site of the former prior's lodge and guest quarters.

== Suppression ==
The very copious bequests made to the friars of East Anglia show that the mendicants, who depended upon charitable donations for subsistence, were substantially favoured by the population they served throughout the 15th and early 16th centuries. Many requested burial at the Blackfriars. Yet they became extremely impoverished. The Greyfriars closed first, where on 7 April 1538 the Visitor for the friaries, Richard Yngworth, Bishop of Dover, prepared an inventory and recovered certain church valuables which had been sold. These he caused to be "leyd in a close house w[ithi]n the blak friers, suarly lokyd, and the p[ri]or chargyd with it".

But even before this, in 1536 and 1537, the Black friars themselves were leasing out whatever properties were not immediately in use, including two gardens to Henry Tooley abutting on the garden of William Sabyn, a mansion and garden to Sir John Willoughby, various houses including "Lady Daundey's Lodging" to William Golding, and two dwellings (Friar Woodcoke's lodging, and another) to William Lawrence. They also leased out "a building called le Frayter, with upper chamber, and free ingress and egress", to Golding and Lawrence. The original Frater (refectory) did not have an upper chamber. If "le Frayter" indicates the original dormitory building, that may be the origin of its later identification as a refectory.

In November 1538 Bishop Yngworth returned and the closure of the Whitefriars and Blackfriars followed. The conventual buildings were at first leased to William Sabyn, King's serjeant-at-arms in Ipswich, whose land adjoined the friars' premises, and who is listed with the others in the minister's accounts of the Blackfriars rental. The entire property was sold to him in November 1541 to hold in chief for the twentieth part of a knight's fee, and a yearly tithe of five shillings. Sabyn was a considerable figure, a naval sea-captain and veteran of numerous engagements, controller of the Ipswich customs (in succession to Sir Edward Echyngham) in 1527, Bailiff, Portman and M.P., and a benefactor of St Mary-at-Key. He soon afterwards died, his will being proved in 1543. By intermediate means it became the property of the Borough of Ipswich. The subsequent uses of the site and buildings have their own stories.
