= Christ's Hospital, Ipswich =

Hospital in Ipswich, England

Christ's Hospital, Ipswich was established in Tudor Ipswich, Suffolk. The original benefactors were Richard Felaw, William Smarte and Henry Tooley.
