= River Church Ipswich =

Coordinates: 52.0529°N 1.1564°E

- Location in Suffolk
- OS grid reference: TM 166 442
- Location: Ipswich, Suffolk
- Country: England
- Denomination: Church of England
- Website: River Church

Architecture
- Functional status: Anglican Church plant

River Church Ipswich is an Anglican church in Ipswich, Suffolk, England. It is part of the network of HTB church plants.

River Church is based at St Mary-at-the-Quay in the Waterfront area of central Ipswich.

== History ==
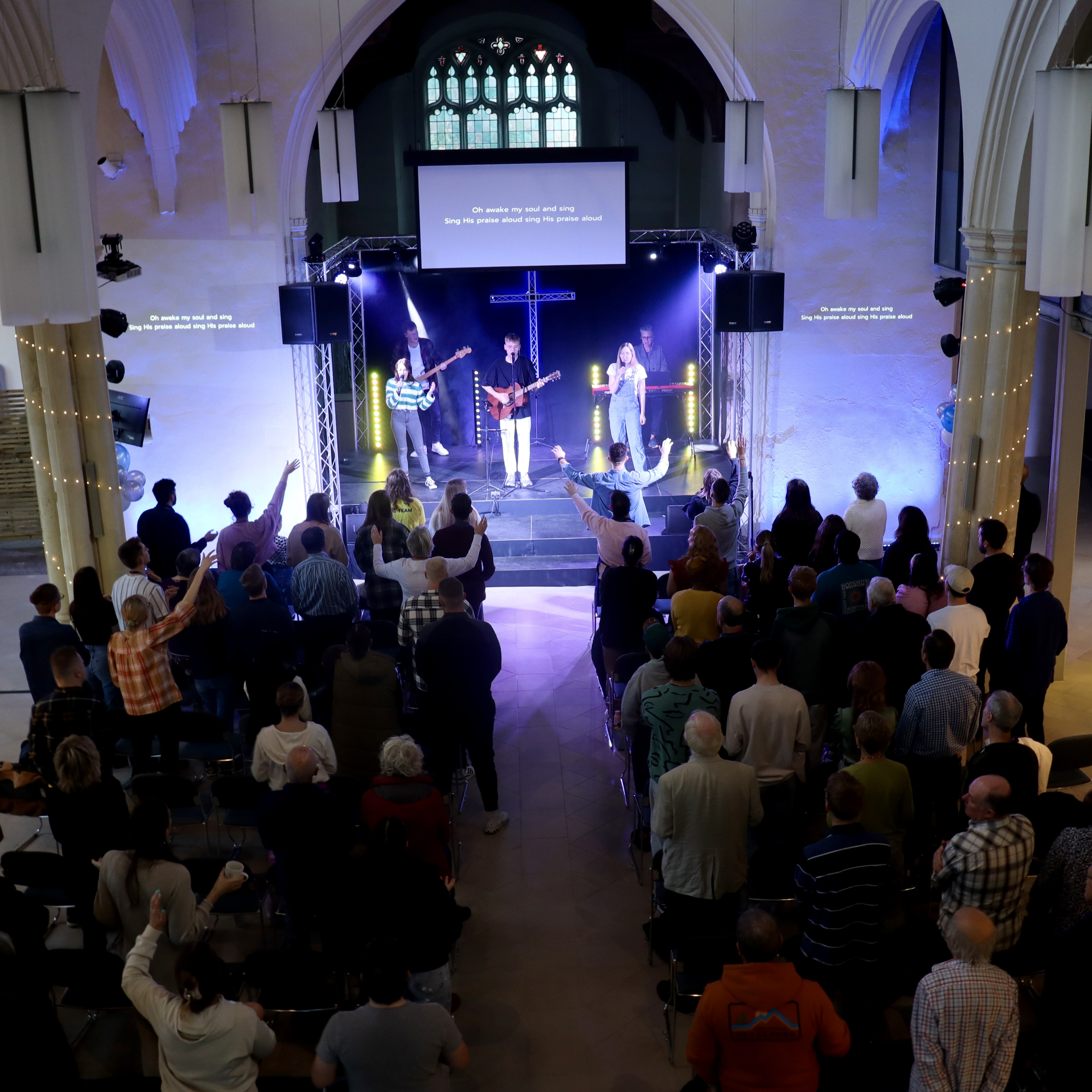
THE SIX at River Church

River Church launched in September 2021 and is led by Amy and Matt Key, who are both ordained in the Church of England. River Church has a dream to see Ipswich overflowing with life, and is popular amongst students from the nearby University of Suffolk. River Church runs regular Alpha courses.
