= Weeting-with-Broomhill =

Coordinates: 52°29′08″N 0°38′52″E

- Civil parish
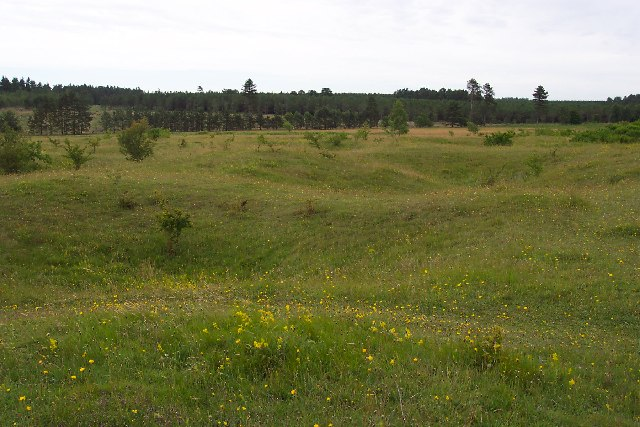
- Grimes Graves

- Location within Norfolk
- Area: 25.16 km^{2} (9.71 sq mi)
- Population: 1,839 (2011 census)
  - Density: 73/km^{2} (190/sq mi)
- OS grid reference: TL798908
- Civil parish: Weeting-with-Broomhill
- District: Breckland
- Shire county: Norfolk
- Region: East
- Country: England
- Sovereign state: United Kingdom
- Post town: BRANDON
- Postcode district: IP27
- Dialling code: 01842
- Police: Norfolk
- Fire: Norfolk
- Ambulance: East of England
- Website: Council website

Weeting-with-Broomhill is a civil parish in the English county of Norfolk. It covers an area of 25.16 km^{2} (9.71 sq mi) and had a population of 1,751 in 786 households at the 2001 census, the population increasing to 1,839 in 814 households at the 2011 Census. The area of the parish includes the village of Weeting. For the purposes of local government, it falls within the district of Breckland. The parish covers the area to the north of Brandon.

The parish contains a Neolithic site known as Grimes Graves. This is an extensive system of Stone Age flint mines. Now a scheduled monument looked after by English Heritage.
