= Weeting =

Coordinates: 52°28′00″N 00°36′42″E

- Village
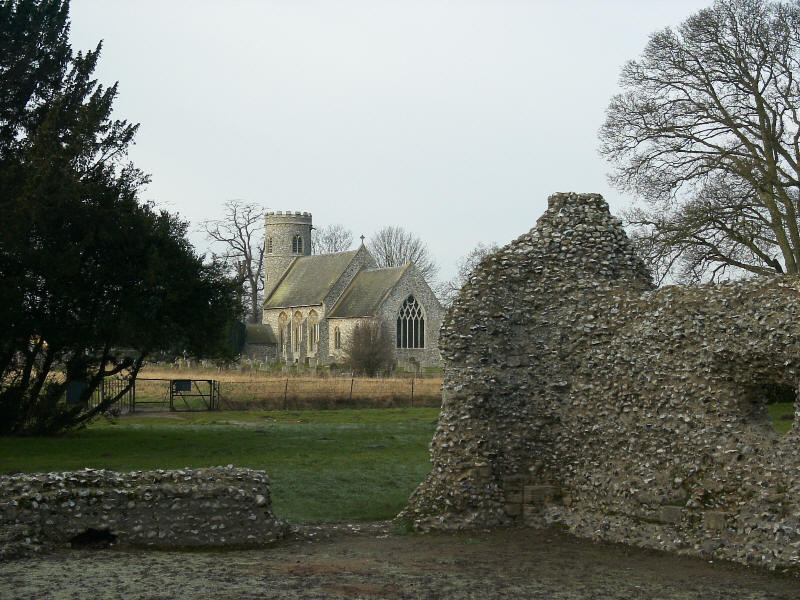
- Weeting St. Mary, seen from the ruin of Weeting Castle

- Location within Norfolk
- District: Breckland
- Shire county: Norfolk
- Region: East
- Country: England
- Sovereign state: United Kingdom
- Post town: Brandon
- Postcode district: IP27
- Dialling code: 01842
- Police: Norfolk
- Fire: Norfolk
- Ambulance: East of England
- UK Parliament: South West Norfolk

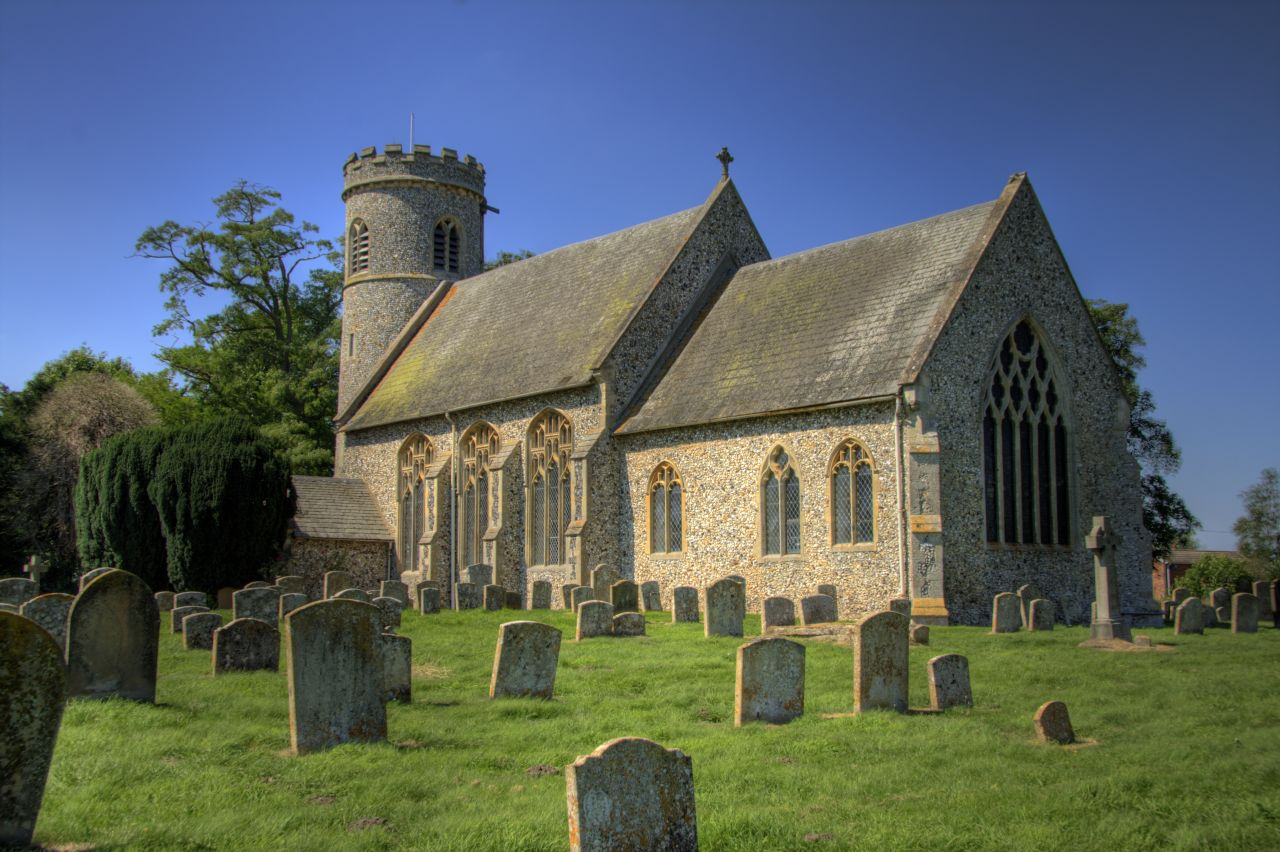
Weeting St. Mary

Weeting is a village in Norfolk, England. The population can be found in the civil parish of Weeting-with-Broomhill.

The village's name means 'wet place'.

== Weeting St Mary Church ==
Its church, St. Mary, stands close to the ruins of Weeting Castle, and is one of 124 existing round-tower churches in Norfolk. Another church, All Saints stood 500M south of St.Mary's, but was destroyed by the fall of its tower in C.1700, the site is still visible today, with various grave markers lining a fence on the south side of the old churchyard, and a high mound marks the location of the church foundations, during dry spells, the crop mark outline of All Saints can be clearly seen, and some flint remains of the tower, south aisle wall, and east wall are just breaking the surface.

== Weeting Hall ==
Weeting Hall was built in the 18th century.

Between 1889 and 1927, the house was owned by Thomas Skarratt Hall, a bank manager who had made a fortune from being a founding investor in the Mount Morgan Mine in Queensland, Australia.

During the 1920s and 1930s, Weeting Hall housed a Ministry of Labour work camp. The Ministry of Labour opened a residential training centre in 1926, aimed at helping unemployed men - particularly war veterans - to acquire basic agricultural techniques. The centre had a capacity of 200; of these, three quarters were expected to emigrate to countries such as Canada or Australia. The training programme initially consisted of a 'testing period', involving heavy manual tasks such as road-making and log-splitting; those judged suitable were then trained in dairy work, ploughing, horse management, rough carpentry and seed planting.

By 1929, the policy of overseas emigration was under severe pressure. High unemployment in the Dominions led to a sharp decline in demand for freshly trained British workers, and the collapse of mining and heavy manufacturing at home had produced new pressures. Weeting Hall was redesignated as an Instructional Centre, taking in young long-term unemployed men from the depressed areas and giving them a three-month exposure to heavy manual work. The Ministry sometimes described this as a "reconditioning" process, which hardened up young men who had gone "soft" through prolonged unemployment. While some of the trainees did find work as a result, quite significant numbers were either dismissed or walked out - despite the risk to their benefits. Weeting was one of a number of work camps opened by the Ministry rising to a total of 35 by 1938; by the summer of 1939, with unemployment falling as war became imminent, all were closed, and several were turned over to other uses. Weeting Hall, which was used to house wounded Indian and Gurkha soldiers during the Second World War, was demolished in 1954.

== Weeting Row ==
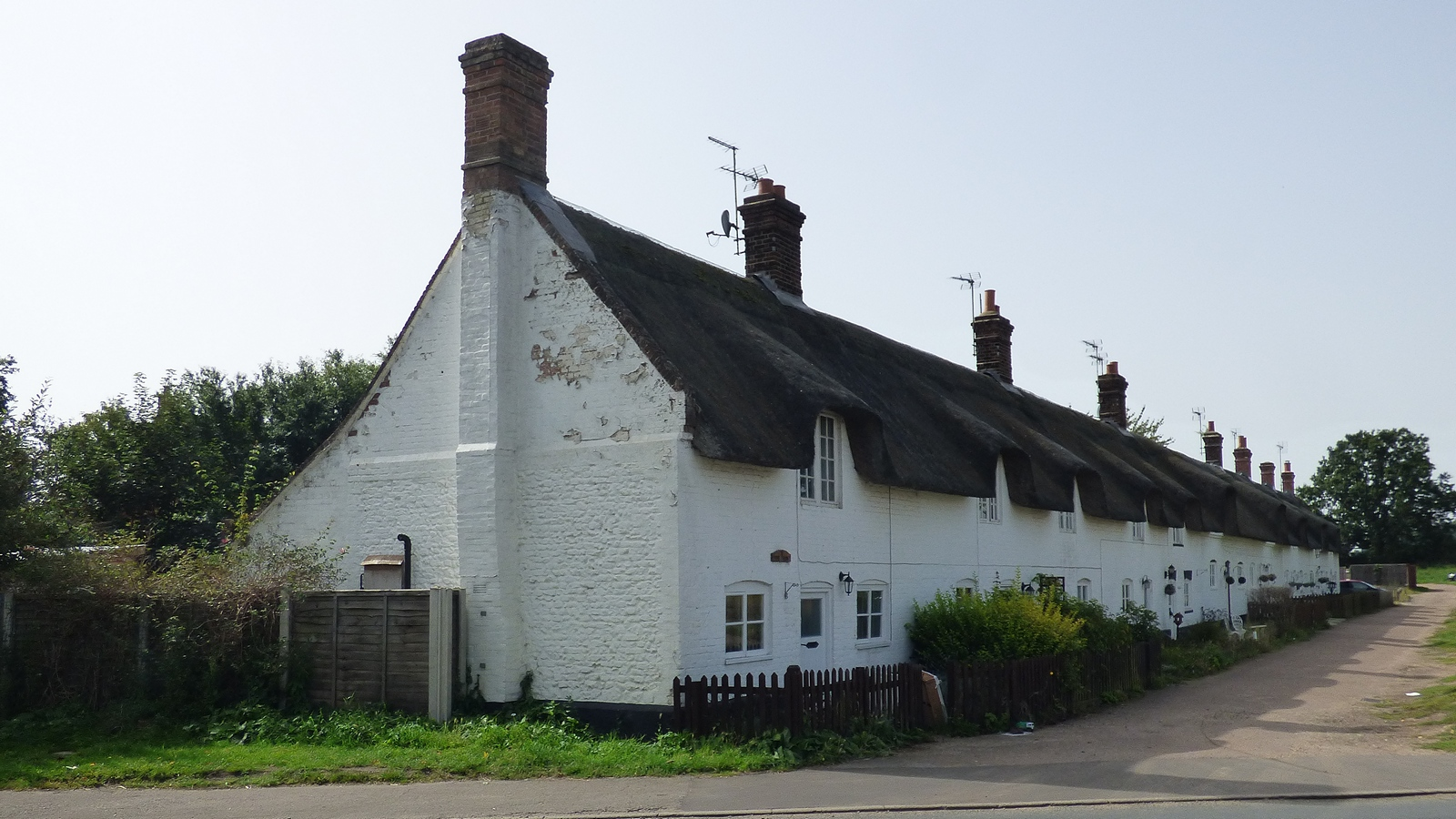
Weeting Row

Weeting has many thatched cottages and is home to one of the longest continuous lines of thatched roofed houses. The row of ten cottages is believed to be dated between the eighteenth and nineteenth century and is Grade II listed. In January 2007 the thatched roof caught fire, initially only damaging one house. However, four months later, another fire ravaged four of the cottages.

== Sources ==
- Field, J. (1992) Learning Through Labour: Training, unemployment and the state, 1890–1939. University of Leeds: Leeds. ISBN 0-900960-48-5.
