= Witherspoon (surname) =

Witherspoon (/ˈwɪðərspuːn/ WIDH-ər-spoon) is a Scottish surname, deriving from the elements wether, an archaic name for 'sheep' and spang, which means 'a narrow strip of land'. The name is found in the county of Lanarkshire. Notable people with the name include:

== Athletics ==
- Ahkello Witherspoon (born 1995), American football player
- Brian Witherspoon (born 1985), American football player
- Chazz Witherspoon (born 1981), heavyweight boxer
- Derrick Witherspoon (born 1971), American football player
- Devon Witherspoon (born 2000), American football player
- Jim Witherspoon (born 1951), Canadian ice hockey player
- Kyson Witherspoon (born 2004), American baseball player
- Reggie Witherspoon (basketball), American baseball coach
- Reggie Witherspoon (sprinter) (born 1985), American sprinter
- Sophia Witherspoon (born 1969), American former basketball player
- Tim Witherspoon (born 1957), American boxer twice recognized as Heavyweight Champion of the World
- Will Witherspoon (born 1980), American football player

== Entertainers ==
- Cora Witherspoon (1890–1957), American actress
- Dane Witherspoon (1957–2014), American actor
- Herbert Witherspoon (1873–1935), American bass singer and opera manager
- Jimmy Witherspoon (1920–1997), American blues singer
- John Witherspoon (actor) (1942–2019), American comedy actor
- Lajon Witherspoon (born 1972), vocalist for the Atlanta-based alternative metal band Sevendust
- Reese Witherspoon (born 1976), American actress and film producer

== Politicians ==
- James Hervey Witherspoon, Jr., (1810–1865), Confederate States of America politician
- John Witherspoon (1723–1794) clergyman and signatory of the United States Declaration of Independence
  - Doctor John Witherspoon, a bronze sculpture in Washington D.C. by William Couper of John Witherspoon
- Robert Witherspoon (1767–1837), U.S. Representative from South Carolina
- Samuel Andrew Witherspoon (1855–1915), U.S. Representative from Mississippi

== Others ==
- Frances M. Witherspoon, (1886–1973), American writer and activist
- Gary Witherspoon, Professor of American Indian studies at the University of Washington
- Sarah Witherspoon, American mathematician
- Sharon Witherspoon, British statistician

== See also ==
- Weatherspoon, a surname
- Wetherspoon (surname)
- Wetherspoons (J D Wetherspoon plc), a British pub company
- Wotherspoon, a surname
