= Wotherspoon =

- Current region: England and Scotland and former British colonies

Wotherspoon is a surname first recorded in the 13th century with its origins in England and Scotland.

== History ==
The history of the surname Wotherspoon reveals a divergent roster of spellings over the centuries. Today only a handful of variants survive including Weatherspoon, Wetherspoon, Wedderspoon and Witherspoon. The first written record appeared in the 13th century during the reign of Queen Margaret of Norway, who ruled over Scotland from 1286 to 1290. In 1290, one Roger Wythirspon was referred to in Orignes Parochiales Scotiae: the Antiquities, ecclesiastical and territorial, of the parishes of Scotland. In 1496, the Accounts of the lord high treasurer (1473 – 1566) recorded "Widderspune the foulare that tald talis and brocht foulis to the King." Other early records of the name come to us from witnessed documents. Maister Nichol Vithirspouyne witnessed letters of reversion in 1519, and Sir Thomas Vaddirspoun, a cleric acted as a witness at Falkland in 1548. The spread of the name to the New World can be witnessed in the names of significant Americans. Reverend John Witherspoon (1722–1794) became president of the College of New Jersey (now Princeton University) in 1768, and was a signatory to the United States Declaration of Independence. General William Wallace Wotherspoon (1850–1921) headed New York's state canal system and was United States Army Chief of Staff in 1914.

== Geographic spread in Great Britain ==
The Wotherspoon surname is common in Scotland, and Northern and North West England. Its geographic origins are difficult to ascertain although its variant spellings are stronger in some regions than others. County Durham had far more inhabitants named Witherspoon than any other county. For example, Witherspoons are 1422 times more likely to be found in the Birtley, County Durham than anywhere else in the UK. However, the Wotherspoon spelling is more commonly found in Central Scotland.

== Global geographic spread ==
Wotherspoon has spread to the United States, New Zealand, Australia and Canada, and other former British colonies. Like the UK, the global community displays a degree of regional difference in spelling. More Witherspoons are citizens of the US than England or Scotland, yet Wotherspoon is more commonly found than any other variant in New Zealand and Australia.

== Disputed English or Viking roots ==
Many genealogical experts have been dumbfounded by the origins of the name Wotherspoon. In 1896 Charles Wareing Endell Bardsley, author of A Dictionary of English and Welsh Surnames concluded his research by noting, "I can make nothing out of this surname, and leave it to the consideration of more enlightened students." Various hypotheses have been given for its origins since. It is sometimes noted that Wotherspoon originated in the ancient kingdom of Dalriada. However, despite this Gaelic background, the theories in current circulation suggest its linguistic origins derive from either the English or Norse invasions into Scotland. The etymology for the Old English theory postulates that the name derives from the term "wether" meaning sheep or ram, and "spong" meaning a narrow strip of land. The Old Norse etymology suggests that Wotherspoon means "water span" deriving from vatn (water) and spenna (span).

== Notable people with the surname ==
- Adella Wotherspoon (1903–2004), General Slocum ship disaster survivor
- Blake Wotherspoon (born 1997), Australian field hockey player
- David Wotherspoon (born 1990), Scottish professional football player
- Dylan Wotherspoon (born 1993), Australian field hockey player
- Jeremy Wotherspoon (born 1976), Canadian speed skater
- Parker Wotherspoon (born 1997), Canadian ice hockey player
- Trent Wotherspoon, Canadian politician
- Tyler Wotherspoon (born 1993), Canadian ice hockey player
- William Wotherspoon (rugby union) (1868–1942), Scottish rugby union international
- William Wallace Wotherspoon (1850–1921), Chief of Staff of the U.S. Army
- William Wallace Wotherspoon (painter) (1821–1888), American landscape painter

== See also ==
- John Wodderspoon (1806-1862), English journalist and antiquarian
- Weatherspoon, a surname
- Wetherspoon (surname)
- Wetherspoons (J D Wetherspoon plc), a British pub company
- Witherspoon (surname)
