= Weatherspoon =

Weatherspoon is a surname. Notable people with the name include:

== American football players ==
- Cephus Weatherspoon (born 1948)
- Chuck Weatherspoon (born 1968)
- Sean Weatherspoon (born 1987)

== Basketball players ==
- Clarence Weatherspoon (born 1970)
- Nick Weatherspoon (1950–2008)
- Quinndary Weatherspoon (born 1996)
- Teresa Weatherspoon (born 1965)

== Musicians ==
- William Weatherspoon (1936–2005)

== See also ==
- Wetherspoon (surname)
- Wetherspoons (J D Wetherspoon plc), a British pub company
- Witherspoon (disambiguation)
- Wotherspoon, a surname
