= Tooley's and Smart's Almshouses =

Coordinates: 52°03′16″N 1°09′28″E

Tooley's and Smart's Almshouses are Grade II listed almshouses in Ipswich which were founded in 1550 by Henry Tooley with a further endowment provided by William Smarte (MP) in 1591. They were rebuilt as a whole in 1846.
