= Wetherspoon (surname) =

Wetherspoon is a surname. Notable people with the surname include:

- John Wetherspoon (1844–1928), Scottish-born farmer and politician in New South Wales, Australia
- Aaron Wetherspoon, a King of the Cage champion in mixed martial arts

== See also ==
- Wetherspoons (J D Wetherspoon plc), a British pub company
- Weatherspoon, a surname
- Witherspoon (surname)
- Wotherspoon, a surname
