= Weeting Castle =

Ruined, medieval manor house in England

- Weeting, Norfolk
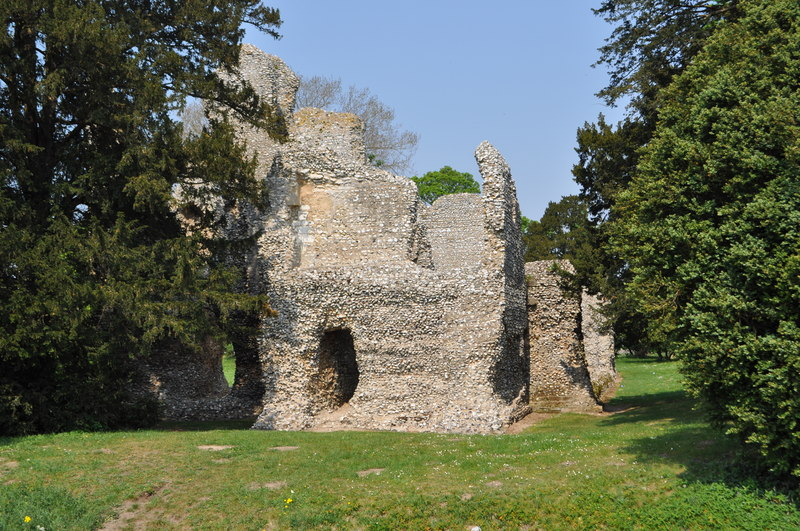
- Remains of the chamber block

Site information
- Type: Manor house
- Controlled by: English Heritage
- Open to the public: Yes
- Condition: Ruined

Location
- Shown within Norfolk
- Coordinates: 52.4711°N 0.6163°E

Site history
- Built: c. 1180
- Materials: Flint

Weeting Castle is a ruined, medieval manor house near the village of Weeting in Norfolk, England. It was built around 1180 by Hugh de Plais, and comprised a three-storey tower, a substantial hall, and a service block, with a separate kitchen positioned near the house. A moat was later dug around the site in the 13th century. The house was not fortified, although it drew on architectural features typically found in castles of the period, and instead formed a very large, high-status domestic dwelling. It was probably intended to resemble the hall at Castle Acre Castle, owned by Hugh's feudal lord, Hamelin de Warenne.

Weeting Castle ceased to be used in the late 14th century and fell into decay. The ruins formed an ornamental feature in the grounds of nearby Weeting Hall from 1770 onwards, and passed into the ownership of the state in 1926 when the government acquired the surrounding estate. The site is now managed by English Heritage and open to visitors.

== 10th–13th centuries ==
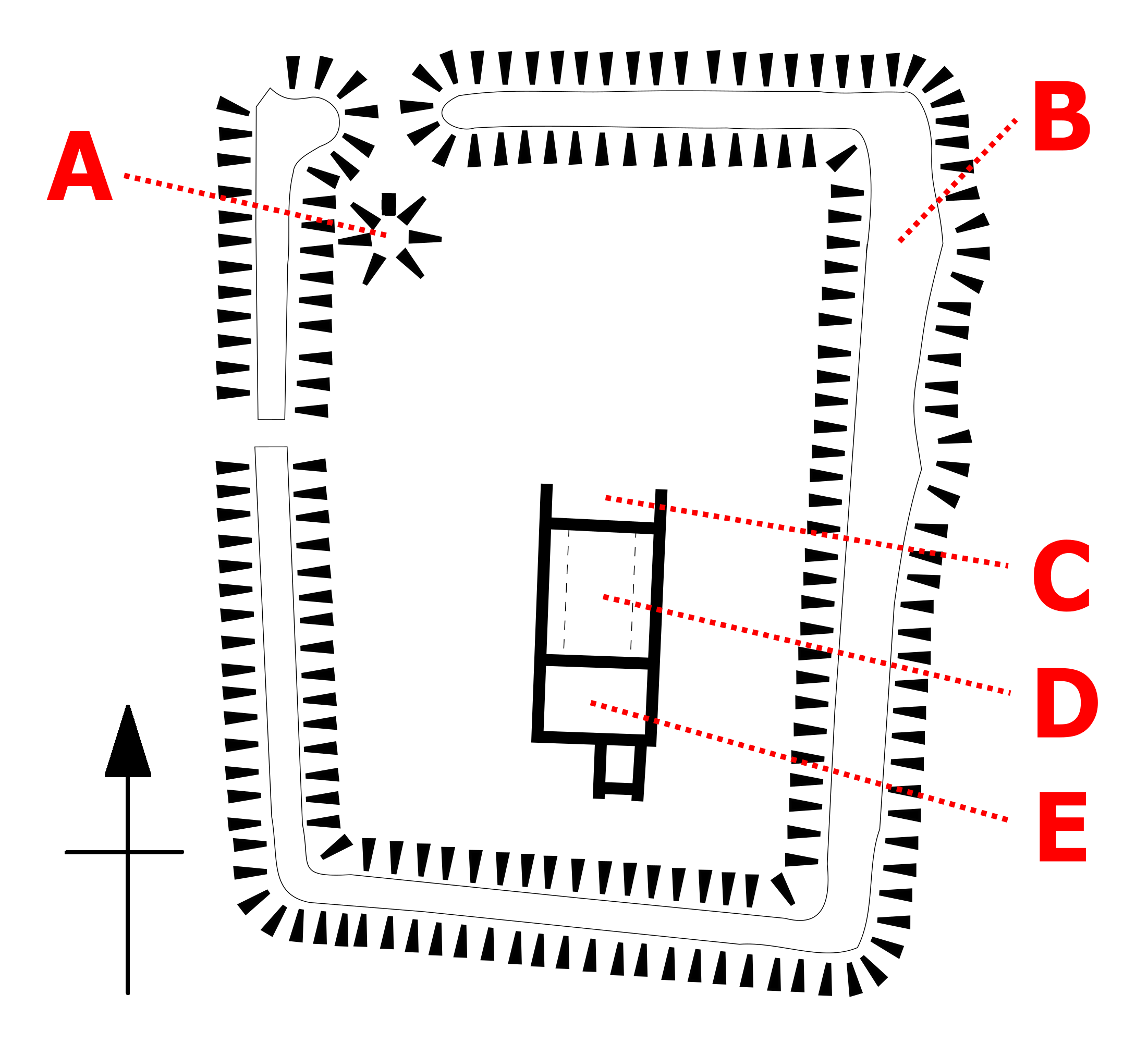
Plan of the castle: A - ice house; B - moat; C - service block; D - hall; E - chamber block

Weeting Castle is located around 750 metres (2,460 ft) north of the village of Weeting in Norfolk, England. There was an earlier Anglo-Saxon settlement at the site in the 10th century, but the castle itself was built around 1180 by Hugh de Plais. Hugh acquired the estate following his marriage to Philippa Montfichet, where he then constructed a very large, stone manor house. The new building was probably intended to resemble the hall at the centre of Castle Acre Castle, then being redeveloped by Hugh's feudal lord, Hamelin de Warenne, the Earl of Surrey. (Note: The design and sequence of the manor house has been subject to academic debate. Following archaeological investigations in 1964–66, it was argued that the house was built in two phases — the chamber block and hall block being built at separate times — and that the hall rested on an undercroft. The historian Thomas "Sandy" Heslop argued against this interpretation in 2000, noting the absence of any supports for an undercroft or evidence of alternative foundations for a different design; Heslop suggested that there was no strong evidence for a multi-phase construction, and that the design of the manor house as a single build would have fitted with contemporary architectural fashions. English Heritage's current interpretation of the property follows Heslop's analysis.)

Hugh's manor house was around 30 by 14 metres (98 by 46 ft) across and comprised three sections running south to north: a chamber block, the main hall, and a service wing. (Note: A service wing or block was a set of rooms in larger medieval buildings, typically including a pantry and buttery. It would be usually located alongside the main hall.) The chamber block, or tower, was three storeys tall, with thick walls made from flint rubble and ashlar. The ground floor formed an undercroft, supporting a solar — a set of private chambers — above. The chamber block would have been entered by an external staircase at the first floor, and an internal newel staircase in the north-west corner linked the different floors. Although not fortified, the tower drew on the architectural traditions of earlier castle keeps and great towers.

The two-storey tall hall was 14.7 by 12 metres (48 by 39 ft) in size internally, with two wooden arcades running down each side, forming narrow aisles along which benches would have run. A raised dais at the northern end, framed by blind stone arcading, would have supported the great table, with similar arcading facing it at the opposite end of the hall. The hall was probably linked by doors to the service block to the north, which was 12 by 3.4 metres (39 by 11 ft) internally in size and contained a pantry and a buttery. A separate kitchen building stood beyond the service block, positioned across a small, enclosed courtyard to reduce the fire risk to the main building.

A 10 metres (33 ft) wide moat was dug around the site in the mid-13th century, creating an island approximately 85 by 60 metres (279 by 197 ft) across internally, accessed by a bridge to the west. The moat was not intended to actually defend the site, but would have aesthetically framed the view of the house within it for anyone approaching the property, highlighting the wealth of its owners.

== 14th–21st centuries ==
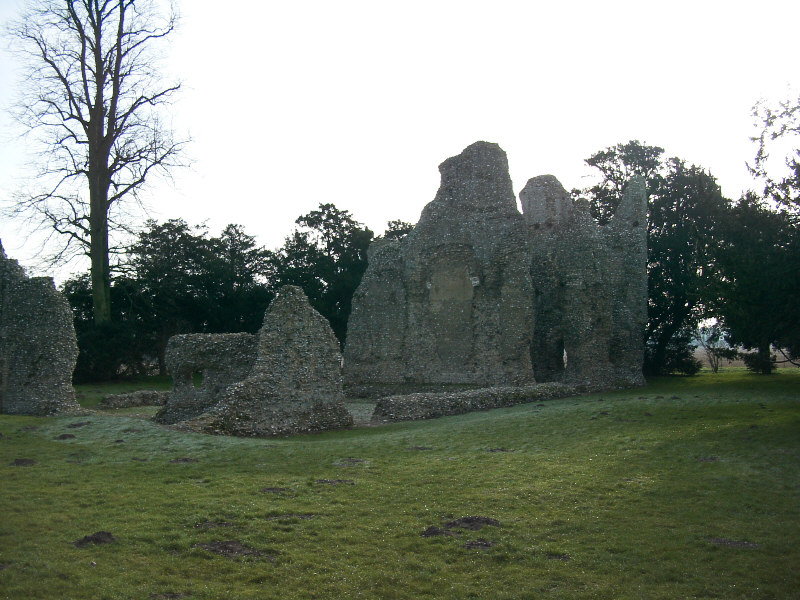
Left to right: the fragments of the service block, the remains of the hall and the chamber block

The male line of the Plais family died out in the late 14th century, and Weeting Castle passed to Sir John Howard, the Earl of Norfolk, through his marriage to Margaret Plais. The manor house was left to fall into ruin, until in 1770 it became an ornamental feature in the grounds of the nearby Weeting Hall, a country house rebuilt by Charles Henry Coote, the Earl of Mountrath.

In 1926, the Ministry of Labour purchased Weeting Hall for use as a residential work camp, and acquired Weeting Castle as part of the estate. As part of their instruction, the trainees were deployed to clear the castle of undergrowth. Weeting Hall was demolished in 1954, but its ice house still survives on the island, comprising a brick and earthen mound, around 16 metres (52 ft) across, which was originally used to store ice harvested from the moat.

Archaeological excavations were undertaken at the site between 1964 and 1966 by the Ministry of Public Works, and the remaining stonework was consolidated. Some of the rubble core of the chamber block and the hall survive today, along with fragments of the ashlar stone; parts of the service block's foundations have also survived, but nothing remains of the kitchen above ground. The moat still partially floods in winter, and the site is now accessed by an earth causeway in the north-west corner, possibly dating to the creation of the nearby hall in the 18th century.

The castle is managed by English Heritage and is open to visitors. The historians Brian Cushion and Alan Davison consider the castle's design to form "a very fine example of an early medieval house", and the heritage agency Historic England notes that the site is "a rare surviving example of a high status 12th century manor house"; it is protected under UK law as a scheduled monument.

== See also ==
- Castles in Great Britain and Ireland
- List of castles in England

== Bibliography ==
- Blomefield, Francis (1805). An Essay Towards a Topographical History of the County of Norfolk. Vol. 2. London, UK: William Miller. OCLC 59116555.
- Cushion, Brian & Davison, Alan (2003). Earthworks of Norfolk. Dereham, UK: Norfolk Museum and Archaeology Service. ISBN 0-905594-38-X.
- Emery, Anthony (2000). Greater Medieval Houses of England and Wales, 1300–1500, Volume 2: East Anglia, Central England and Wales. Cambridge, UK: Cambridge University Press. ISBN 978-0-521-58131-8.
- Fry, Sebastian (2014). "A History of the National Heritage Collection, Volume Four: 1913-1932". Research Report Series. Portsmouth, UK: English Heritage. ISSN 2046-9799.
- Gardiner, Mark & Kilby, Susan (2018). "Perceptions of Medieval Settlement". In Gerrard, Christopher & Gutiérrez, Alejandra (eds.). The Oxford Handbook of Later Medieval Archaeology in Britain. Oxford, UK: Oxford University Press. pp. 210–225. ISBN 978-0-19-874471-9.
- Heslop, Thomas Alexander (2000). "'Weeting 'Castle', a Twelfth-Century Hall House in Norfolk". Architectural History. 43: 42–57. doi:10.2307/1568685. ISSN 0066-622X. JSTOR 1568685. S2CID 162657040.
- Hull, Lisa (2009). Understanding the Castle Ruins of England and Wales: How to Interpret the History and Meaning of Masonry and Earthworks. Jefferson, US: McFarlane and Company. ISBN 978-0-7864-3457-2.
