= Bromehill Priory =

Priory in Norfolk, England

Bromehill Priory was an Augustinian priory in Norfolk, England.

It was founded before 1224 by Sir Hugh de Plaiz. It was suppressed in 1528 and then dissolved within the first half of the 16th century.
