= John Wodderspoon =

English journalist and antiquarian

John Wodderspoon (1806, Bath, Somerset – 19 November 1862, Norwich) was an English journalist and antiquarian, assistant editor of the Norwich Mercury.

== Life ==
Wodderspoon worked for the Bath Chronicle before moving to work for the Birmingham Journal for a couple of years. For ten years he was a reporter for the Suffolk Chronicle. His early books Sketches of the Suffolk Bar and Historic sites of Suffolk were begun in the Suffolk Literary Chronicle, which was printed at the Suffolk Chronicle office in 1839. In 1845 he edited the Antiquarian and Architectural Year Book, dedicated to his friend John Britton, with contributions from John Stevens Henslow, Rev. Stephen Isaacson (1798–1849), Rev. J. B. Deane, Rev. J. L. Pettit, Mr. T. F. Dukes, Dr. Charlton, Augustus Pugin, Charles Roach Smith and others. After briefly working as a parliamentary reporter for the Morning Post, he became sub-editor and reporter on the Norwich Mercury in 1848.

== Works ==
- Historic sites of Suffolk. With introductory verses, 1841
- A new guide to Ipswich; containing notices of its ancient and modern history, antiquities, buildings, institutions, social and commercial condition, 1842
- Picturesque Antiquities of Ipswich illustrated by Frederick Brett Russell and George Walter Hagreen (1845)
- Memorials of the ancient town of Ipswich, in the county of Suffolk, 1847
- Notes on the Grey and White Friars, Ipswich, 1848
- Memorials of the ancient town of Ipswich, in the county of Suffolk, 2 vols, 1850
- John Crome and his works : with lists of his pictures exhibited in Norwich from the year 1805 to 1821 inclusive : some account of the Norwich society of artists : short notices of painters : the local contemporaries of Crome, Norwich: Printed for private circulation by Richard Noverre Bacon, at the Office of the Norwich Mercury, 1858
