= St Mary-at-the-Quay Church, Ipswich =

Coordinates: 52.0529°N 1.1564°E

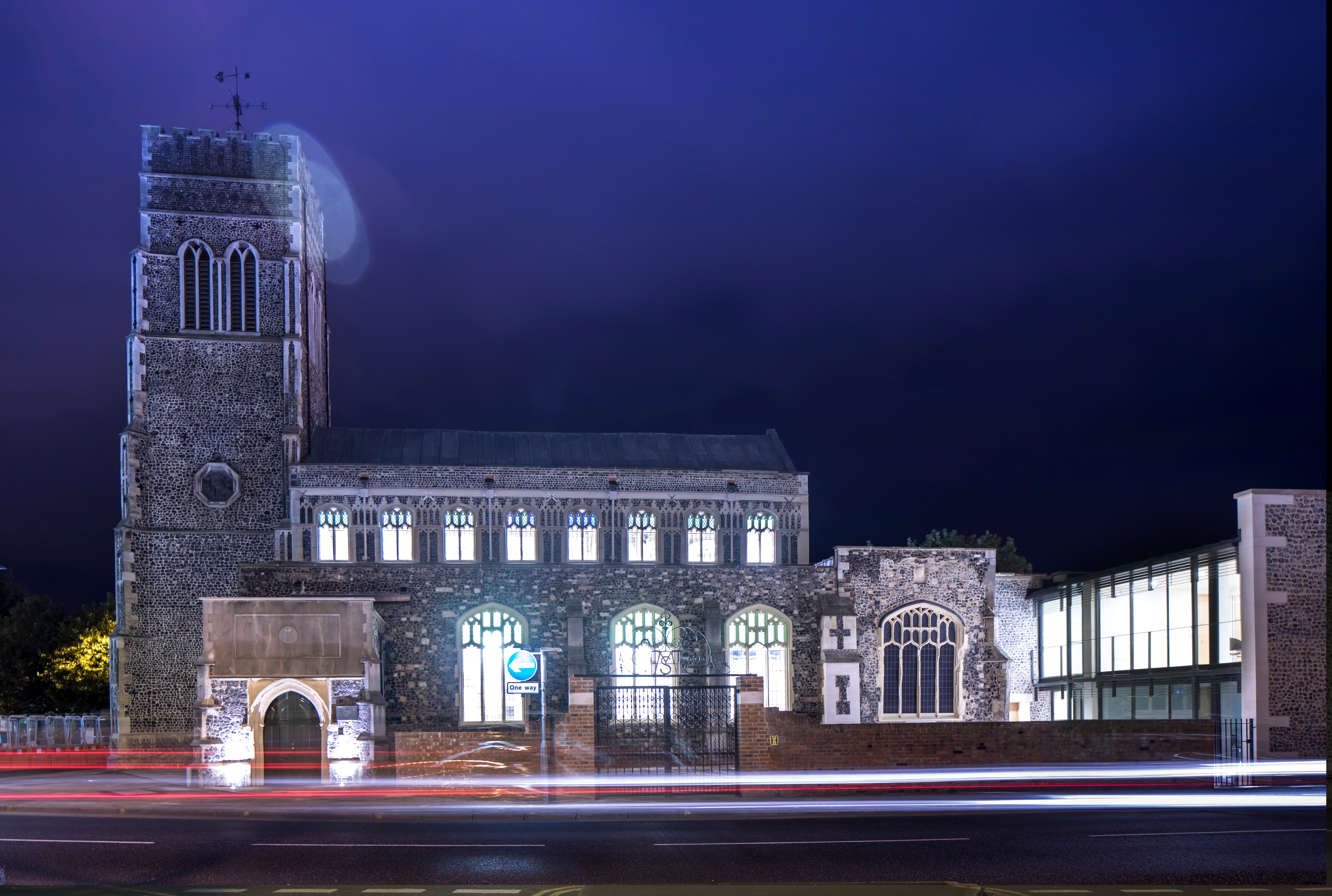
- St Mary-at-the-Quay Church, Key Street at Night

- Location in Suffolk
- OS grid reference: TM 166 442
- Location: Ipswich, Suffolk
- Country: England
- Denomination: Anglican
- Website: River Church Churches Conservation Trust

Architecture
- Functional status: Anglican Church plant
- Heritage designation: Grade II*
- Designated: 19 December 1951
- Architectural type: Church
- Style: Perpendicular Gothic

Specifications
- Materials: Flint with stone dressings

St Mary-at-the-Quay Church is a former Anglican church in Ipswich, Suffolk, England. The medieval building is under the care of the Churches Conservation Trust. and since September 2021 it has been used by River Church to implement an approach to evangelicism developed by Holy Trinity Brompton as part of the network of HTB church plants. The church originally served the thriving industry around the docks area of the town and those that worked there. After closing for regular worship in the 1950s the church was transferred to the CCT in 1973 and underwent a major restoration programme completing in 2016.

== Architecture and History ==
The medieval church on Key Street, Ipswich was formerly known as The Key Church, and the Church of Our Lady Star of the Sea (Stella Maris).

The church is constructed in flint with stone dressings. Its plan includes a nave with a clerestory, north and south aisles, transepts, and a west tower. The tower has diagonal buttresses decorated with flushwork, and an embattled parapet. Its architectural style is Perpendicular.

Inside the church, the nave has a double hammerbeam roof, with carvings of the apostles, important figures in Ipswich history, and other designs. In the church is a 15th-century octagonal font. The font had been removed to a church at Brantham, but has been returned. Also in the church are the tomb and brass of Henry Tooley, who built the almshouses nearby, and a copy of the Pownder brass. Thomas Pounder (or Pownder), like Henry Tooley, was an Ipswich merchant. The original of the brass is in Ipswich Museum. The current St Mary's building was built between about 1450 and 1550, on the site of an earlier church dating back to the 1200s, in the dockland area of the town, the centre of the merchant community. It was one of twelve medieval churches in Ipswich, and one of three mariners' churches. At this time it was probably known as Stella Maris (Our Lady, Star of the Sea). During the 18th century the focus of economic activity moved away from the dockland area, and the size of the congregation declined. Over the years, flooding of the church has caused structural problems and, in an attempt to prevent this, the vaults were filled with concrete during the 19th century. In 1940–42 during the Second World War, the church was damaged by bombs, and most of the stained glass was lost.

== Renovation and community use ==
After the war the church closed for worship and in the 1990s repairs were organised by the Friends of Friendless Churches. The church was then used as the headquarters of Ipswich's Boys' Brigade. When they left the church it was vested in the Churches Conservation Trust in 1973, by which time most of the furnishings and contents had been removed. The Trust organised urgent structural repairs, in particular to deal with flooding, as the salt water was causing decay of the columns of the arcades. During the 2000s the church was a venue for art exhibitions and performance. run by an arts organisation known as Key Arts. In 2010 plans were made for the church to be converted and extended for a wellbeing centre, to be run by Suffolk Mind, assisted by a £3.5m grant from the Heritage Lottery Fund and donations from numerous foundations. After an eight year overhaul MIND opened at the church in 2016 but abandoned the project less than four years later due to the high maintenance costs and low use of the project.

== River Church ==
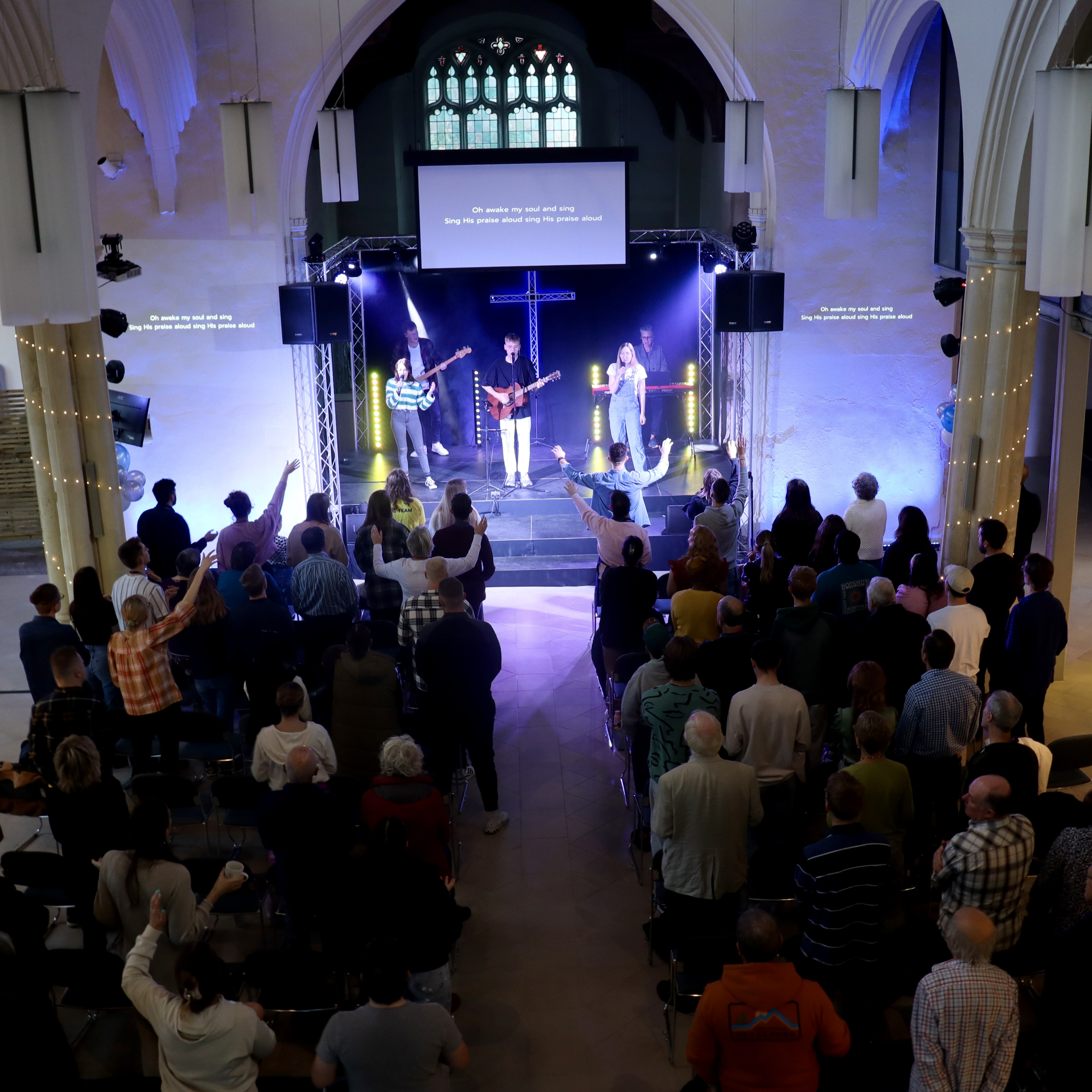
THE SIX at River Church

River Church launched in 2021 and is led by Amy and Matt Key, who are ordained in the Church of England. The charismatic evangelical River Church evangelises students from the nearby University of Suffolk. and runs Alpha courses developed by clergy at Holy Trinity Brompton, aiming to appeal to non-Christians by offering free food, talks and live music. River Church serves weekday refreshments.

== See also ==
- List of churches preserved by the Churches Conservation Trust in the East of England
