= William Smarte =

English politician

William Smarte (ca. 1530 – 23 September 1599), of Ipswich, Suffolk, was an English merchant and landowner.

William father was Richard Smart(e), a draper in the parish of St Mary-le-Tower, Ipswich, who had held the political office of Bailiff in Ipswich.. His mother was Richard's wife, Katherine Went. When his father died in 1560 William inherited four manors in Essex and Suffolk.

== Career ==
The first role he took as an office holder for the corporation was as treasurer, 1560-1. He was elected a portman in 1565 and was elected bailiff five times from 1569 to 1594.

In May 1586 he was imprisoned in Marshalsea following his action to obstruct the sending of supplies to Robert Dudley, 1st Earl of Leicester who had accepted the post of Governor-General of the United Provinces following the death of William the Silent, Prince of Orange. Leicester was keen to confront the Spanish commander, Alexander Farnese, Duke of Parma, who aimed to suppress the Dutch rebels further following his capture of Antwerp. However, Queen Elizabeth I was infuriated by such enthusiasm and instructed him to avoid any decisive victories. At a time when Leicester was trying to lift the Siege of Grave, Smarte issued a proclamation in Ipswich assembling a body of citizens who joined him on a ship owned by Thomas Bennett, where they found a quantity of Suffolk bacon, which they seized and sold or otherwise distributed. In this he had the support of Ipswich Corporation: the Town Clerk and other citizens sent letters to the Privy Council supporting the probity of his actions.

He was a Member of Parliament (MP) in the 7th Parliament of Queen Elizabeth I, representing Ipswich in 1588.

== Charitable endowments ==
He made a substantial endowment to the almshouses in Ipswich in 1591, which then became known as the Tooley's and Smart's Almshouses.

On his death in 1599 he gave a number of medieval manuscripts, originally from the abbey of Bury St Edmunds, to Pembroke College, Cambridge.
