= Henry Tooley =

- Died: 1551; Ipswich
- Occupation: merchant
- Years active: 1499-1551
- Known for: wealth,
- Notable work: Tooley Almshouses

Henry Tooley (d. 1551) was a Suffolk, England merchant. Alive during the Tudor period, by the time of his death he was one of the richest businessmen in the town of Ipswich. He was closely associated with the fellow merchant and Member of Parliament for Ipswich, Robert Daundy. His trade network extended Biscayan ports, the Netherlands and Iceland as well as including much of East Anglia east of line drawn between Chelmsford and Thetford – and the highly populated and industry towns of south Suffolk in particular.

== Early life ==
The Ram Inn, illustrated by Edward Pocock in 1889, often cited as the birth place of Tooley

Two locations have been put forward for the origin of his family: Corton, Suffolk or Catton, Norfolk. He was born in the last quarter of the 15th century. Traditional accounts claim he was born in the house which became the Ram Inn. He probably completed an apprenticeship, but there is no mention of him in the records until 1499 when 'Henry Toly' is mentioned occupying some land near the river in Ipswich. His biographer, John Webb, suggests that he worked as a factor with at least one established merchant before engaging in trade on his own account.

== Family life ==
Henry had two sisters: Joan (born c 1470) who first married someone about whom little is known. He may have had some connection with Thomas Ufford, one of the bailiffs of Yarmouth in 1510. When she remarried, her husband was Ralph Dene, who himself was three times a bailiff of Yarmouth (1517, 1526 and 1536) and died in 1543. A second sister, Margaret (or Maud), married William Rede of Beccles. In 1541 Rede was assigned the manor and advowson of Beccles, which had previously been in the hands of the Abbey of Bury St Edmunds. The last Abbot, John Reeve relinquished control in 1539 and then died 1540 before the property was transferred. Their son, also called William, was born in London in 1509 inherited the manor and advowson and married Anne Ferneley. a niece of Edmund Daundy. After William's death in 1552, she married Sir Thomas Gresham, founder of the Royal Exchange in London.

== Legacies ==
He left two testaments to his lucrative career as a merchant the Tooley Almshouses and the account books preserved in the Suffolk Record Office.
