= Cobbold =

Cobbold is a surname. Notable people with the surname include:

- Cameron Cobbold, 1st Baron Cobbold (1904–1987), Governor of the Bank of England
- David Lytton Cobbold, 2nd Baron Cobbold (born 1937), British peer
- Edgar Sterling Cobbold (1851–1936), British palaeontologist
- Elizabeth Cobbold (1765–1824), British writer and poet
- Lady Evelyn Cobbold (1867–1963), Scottish noblewoman and convert to Islam
- Felix Cobbold (1841–1909), British barrister and politician
- Hermione Cobbold, Baroness Cobbold (1905–2004), wife of Cameron
- Humphrey Cobbold (born 1964), British businessman
- Joe Cobbold (1927–2003), British greyhound trainer
- John Cobbold (disambiguation), several people
- Nevill Cobbold (1862–1922), footballer
- Ralph Cobbold (1869–1965), British soldier and writer
- Richard Cobbold (1797–1877), British writer
- Thomas Cobbold (disambiguation), several people
- William Cobbold (composer) (1560–1639), English composer

== See also ==
- Cobbold family of which many of the above are members
- Cobbold family tree
- Baron Cobbold
- Cobbold Commission
- Tolly Cobbold, brewing company
