= Cobbold family =

British brewing and business family

The Cobbold family became influential in Ipswich and Suffolk in the eighteenth and nineteenth centuries. The family is best known for brewing, moving its operations from Harwich to Ipswich in 1746, and as the driving force behind Ipswich Town Football Club, both as an amateur and professional team. During its Victorian heyday, the family also had interests in coal, shipping, the railways and banking.

== Cobbold Ale ==
Thomas Cobbold (1680-1752), a maltster, founded a brewery at King's Quay Street, Harwich in 1723. The brackish water of the coastal town compromised the quality of his beer. To improve it, in 1741, Thomas rented land at Holy Wells (now Holywells), Ipswich, to secure access to its natural spring and began transporting this water to his Harwich brewery by schuyt. In 1746, the family's brewing operations moved to Ipswich, when Thomas purchased land at the Cliff beside the River Orwell below the springs at Holy Wells, and built the Cliff Brewery there. The move was overseen by Thomas' son, second-generation brewer, Thomas (1708-1767). Workings were constructed to channel the spring waters from Holy Wells directly into the brewery.

The rapid expansion of Ipswich during the late eighteenth and early nineteenth century and the establishment of a garrison in the town in 1793 increased the market for Cobbold ale. Third-generation brewer, John Cobbold (1746-1835) took full advantage, acquiring several old Tudor properties in the town and the surrounding area which he converted to pubs. John also bought Pitt's Farm adjacent to the springs at Holy Wells to tighten his grip on the supply of water and, in 1814, he moved his family into the old farmhouse which he renovated and extended. John's second wife, Elizabeth (née Knipe) chose the name, Holywells for the new home.

The brewery continued to operate under the stewardship of John's son, John Wilkinson Cobbold (1774-1860) and grandson, John Chevallier Cobbold, MP (1797–1882) as the family diversified into shipping, the railways and banking. In 1896, seventh-generation brewer, John Dupuis Cobbold (1861-1929), demolished the original brewery. The new Cliff Brewery remains an imposing landmark on Ipswich's foreshore.

The new brewery and the acquisition of more pubs sustained the business through the turmoil of two world wars. In 1957, Cobbold brewing operations merged with those of the Tollemache family. The Tollemaches, a noble Suffolk family, had begun brewing in Ipswich in 1888. Following the merger, the Tollemache brewery in Upper Brook Street, Ipswich was closed. An expanded Cliff Brewery began brewing and distributing Tolly Cobbold ale.

Tolly Cobbold's fortunes waned during the economic upheaval of the 1970s, a period when much larger breweries, such as Bass and Courage, came to dominate the industry. In 1977, Tolly Cobbold was sold to the Ellerman shipping group, which sold it to the Barclay Brothers in 1983 who, in turn, sold it to Brent Walker in 1989. In 1990, directors Brian Cowie and Bob Wales led a successful management buy-out of the brewery for £4m, supported by both the Tollemache and Cobbold families. New beers were released, guided tours of the brewery were introduced and the advice of Sir John Harvey Jones through his BBC show, Troubleshooter, was sought. The revival lasted until 2002 when the business was acquired by Ridley's Brewery, who closed the Cliff Brewery. Ridley's was acquired by Greene King in 2005.

== Notable Family Members ==
- William Cobbold (1560-1639), composer
- Thomas Cobbold (1680–1752), 1st generation brewer
- Thomas Cobbold (1708-1767), 2nd generation brewer
- John Cobbold (1746-1835), 3rd generation brewer and businessman
- Elizabeth Cobbold (1765–1824), patron of the Arts
- John Wilkinson Cobbold (1774-1860), 4th generation brewer and businessman
- John Chevallier Cobbold, MP (1797–1882), 5th generation brewer, businessman and politician
- Richard Cobbold (1797-1877), novelist, illustrator, Rector of Wortham
- Thomas Spencer Cobbold, FRS (1828-1886), helminthologist
- John Patteson Cobbold, MP (1831–1875), 6th generation brewer and politician
- Thomas Clement Cobbold, MP (1833-1883), politician and diplomat
- Felix Thornley Cobbold, MP (1841-1909), politician, agriculturist and philanthropist
- Edgar Sterling Cobbold, FGS (1851-1936), geologist
- John Dupuis Cobbold (1861-1929), 7th generation brewer
- William Nevill Cobbold (1863-1922), England footballer
- Zainab Cobbold (1867–1963), countrywoman, traveller and writer
- Ralph Patteson Cobbold (1869-1965), British Army officer and explorer
- Cameron Cobbold, 1st Baron Cobbold (1904–1987), Governor of the Bank of England, Lord Chamberlain
- John Cavendish Cobbold (1927–1983), brewer and chairman of Ipswich Town FC
- Patrick Cobbold (1934–1994), chairman of Ipswich Town FC
- David Lytton Cobbold, 2nd Baron Cobbold (1937-2022), banker
- Henry Lytton Cobbold, 3rd Baron Cobbold (1962-), screenwriter

== Family property ==
The family has owned Glemham Hall in Little Glemham, Suffolk, since 1923. It was offered for sale with Strutt & Parker in 2024, for £19,000,000.

== Coat of Arms ==
Coat of Arms of Cobbold family, Baron Cobbold of Knebworth in the County of Hertford.

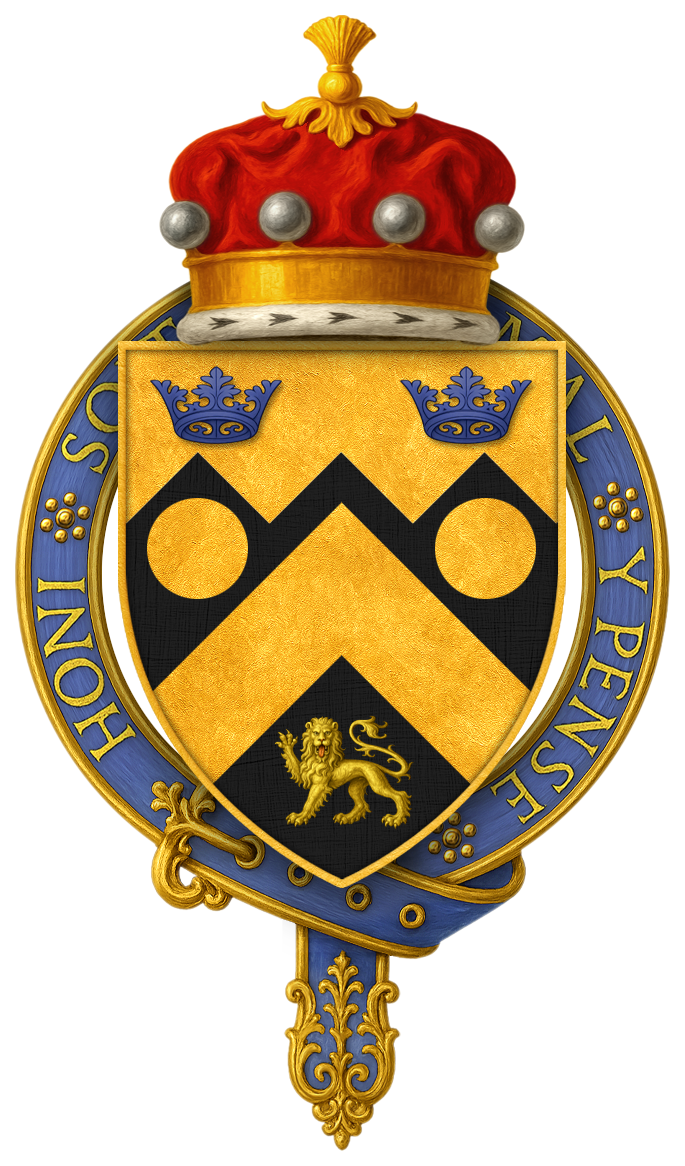
Garter-encircled Coat of Arms of Cameron "Kim" Cobbold, 1st Baron Cobbold KG GCVO PC DL

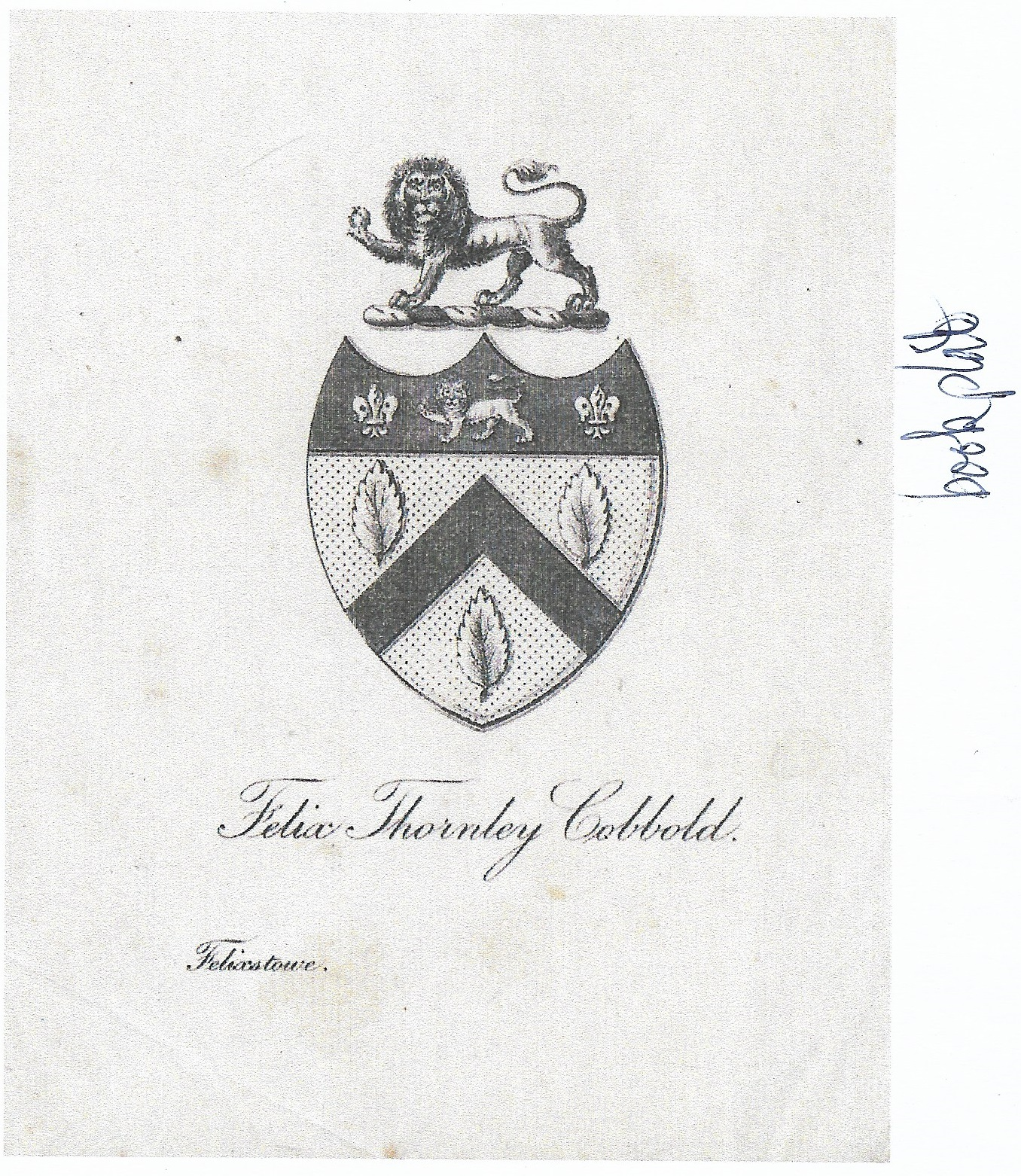
Felix Thornley Cobbold's Coat of Arms

== See also ==
- Baron Cobbold
