= List of former Cobbold pubs =

Thomas Cobbold established a brewing business in East Anglia in 1723. It remained a family business of the Cobbold family until 1957, when they merged the business with that of the Tollemache family, creating Tolly Cobbold. The brand came to dominate the hospitality industry in Ipswich where traces of their name can still be found on a number of buildings.

Frank Woolnough, formerly the curator of Ipswich Museum, recognised the historic interest of the Cobbold "Inns and Taverns" remarking he preferred such words to the term "public house" which he regarded as more recent and common. He wrote the Souvenir of the bi-centenary of the Cliff Brewery 1723–1923 published in 1923 under the name Felix Walton. This contained "A Selection of Ancient and Historical Inns attached to the Cliff Brewery".

Before Tolly Cobbold were taken over by Ellerman Lines in 1977, the company owned a large number of public houses across East Anglia.

Image	Name of pub	Area	TC	Dates	Status	Notes
November 2021	Cock and Pye	Central Ipswich	TC	Before 1689 – still open		
	Lord Nelson	Ashbocking	TC	Closed in 1984	Demolished	
52.0451°N 1.1721°E 2021	Margaret Catchpole	South East Ipswich	TC	1936 – still open	Grade II* listed building	
2021	Steam Packet	South East Ipswich	TC	closed 18 September 1960		
2011	Swan Inn, Alderton	Alderton, Suffolk	TC	closed during Covid pandemic	Also a restaurant	
52°3′42″N 1°9′36″E 2021	Woolpack	Central Ipswich	TC	still open	Grade II listed building	
