= Thomas Cobbold =

Thomas Cobbold may refer to:

- Thomas Cobbold (1680–1752), brewer and founder of the Cobbold brewing business in Harwich
- Thomas Cobbold (1708–1767), brewer and founder of the Cliff Brewery in 1746
- Thomas Cobbold (diplomat) (Thomas Clement Cobbold) (1833–1883), MP for Ipswich
- Thomas Spencer Cobbold (1828–1886), English man of science

== See also ==
- Cobbold family tree, showing the relationship between the above
