= John Cobbold =

John Cobbold may refer to:

- John Cobbold (1746–1835), brewer, banker, merchant
- John Cobbold (1774–1860), brewer, banker, merchant, son of the above
- John Cobbold (1797–1882), brewer and MP for Ipswich, son of the above
- John Cobbold (1831–1875), MP for Ipswich, son of the above
- John Cobbold (businessman) (1927–1983), English businessman, chairman of Ipswich Town F.C., 1957–1976

== See also ==
- Cobbold family tree, showing the relationship between the above
