= Rattlesden =

Village in Suffolk, England

Coordinates: 52.194°N 0.895°E

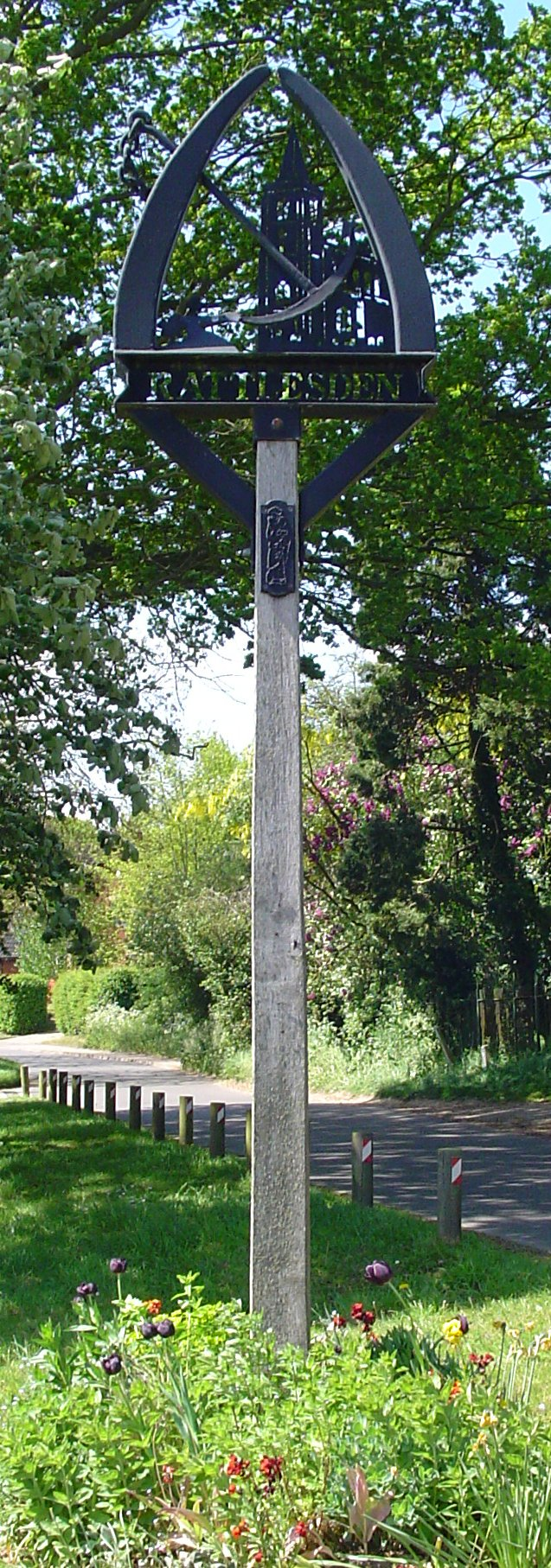

- Location within Suffolk
- Population: 900; 959 (2011)
- District: Mid Suffolk
- Shire county: Suffolk
- Region: East
- Country: England
- Sovereign state: United Kingdom
- Post town: Bury St Edmunds
- Postcode district: IP30
- Police: Suffolk
- Fire: Suffolk
- Ambulance: East of England

Rattlesden is a village and civil parish in the Mid Suffolk district of Suffolk in eastern England. It is approximately 15 miles (24 km) north-west from the county town of Ipswich, with the nearest town Stowmarket 4 miles (6 km) to the east. The parish includes the hamlets of Hightown Green and Poystreet Green.

In 2005 the population of Rattlesden was 900, and for the 2011 Census the returns included the neighbouring parish of Shelland.

The Anglican parish church of St Nicholas dates to the 13th century, with later additions and alterations.

== History ==
The village and surrounding area, like much of East Anglia, was a hotbed of Puritan sentiment during much of the 16th and 17th centuries. In 1634, a local wheelwright, Richard Kimball led a relatively large company from Rattlesden to the Massachusetts Bay Colony as part of the wave of emigration that occurred during the Great Migration.

Thomas Cobbold (1680–1752), the brewer who established the Cliff Brewery and first member of the Cobbold family brewing dynasty, was born at Rattlesden. John Pretyman (1753/1754–1817), the Anglican priest who served as Archdeacon of Lincoln from 1793 to 1817, was a curate of the parish.

During the Second World War, Rattlesden was the site of the U.S. Army Air Force heavy bomber base, RAF Rattlesden. The site is now used by the Rattlesden Gliding Club.

In 1975 the historic core of the village became a conservation area under the auspices of the district council and the guidelines of English Heritage.
