= David Sheepshanks =

British businessman

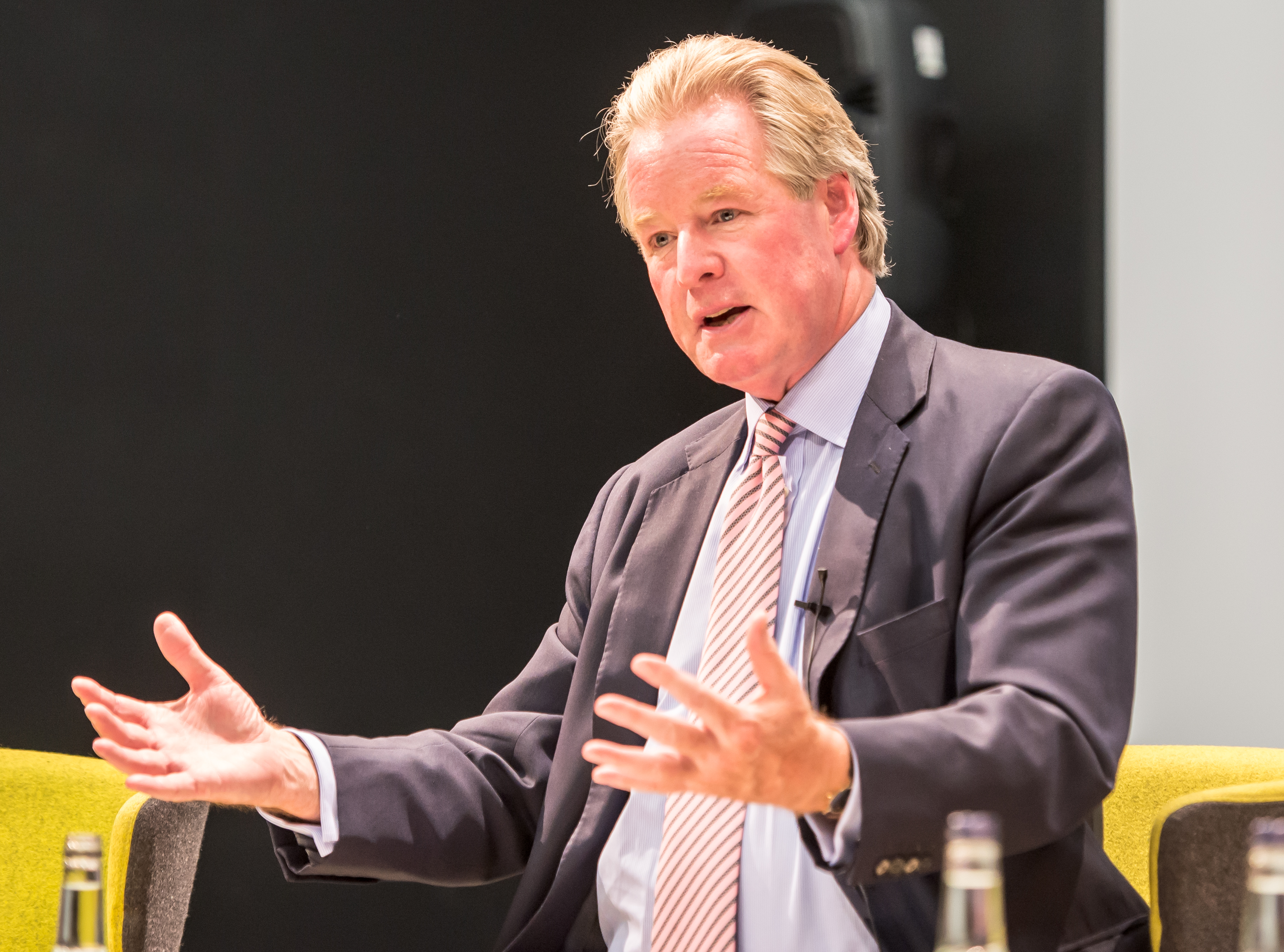
David Sheepshanks in 2014

David Richard Sheepshanks CBE DL is the founding and current Chairman of the St George's Park National Football Centre and former chairman of Ipswich Town FC. He is also former chairman of UK Community Foundations (UKCF), the umbrella organisation for all community foundations in the UK, providing philanthropic advice to clients and delivering UK-wide grant-making programmes. Other business interests include non-executive roles with Coutts Bank, 21st Club and Onside Law. Past business interests included Starfish Ltd 1980–1990 and Suffolk Foods Ltd which he founded in 1990 with his brother Rick and where he was chairman and a majority shareholder before selling in 2004.

== Career ==
=== Ipswich Town ===
Sheepshanks was elected to the Ipswich Town board in 1987 and was appointed chairman in 1995. During his time at Ipswich he oversaw a complete reorganisation of the club, led by his famous 5-year plan. He oversaw the club's promotion back to the Premier League in 2000 and qualification for the UEFA Cup the following year under the management of George Burley, and invested heavily into the redevelopment of Portman Road. However, relegation followed in 2002 and a severe drop in income led to a period of administration between February and May 2003. The other two clubs relegated that season, Leicester City and Derby County, suffered a similar fate when the new August transfer window took effect and the League's broadcaster, ITV Digital, went bankrupt. With the club still some £32 million in debt and needing new income, Sheepshanks led the search for a buyer for the club and in October 2007, it was announced that the club had reached an agreement with businessman Marcus Evans for him to purchase a controlling stake in the club. The deal was completed in December 2007 with Evans becoming the club's owner, who purchased the club's outstanding debt and invested £12 million into the club, with Sheepshanks remaining chairman. On 1 July 2009, Sheepshanks stood down as chairman of the club after 14 years in the role and Evans took over full time.

=== Other ventures ===
In 1997, he was appointed chairman of the Football League for two years where he helped with the re-structuring of the league and appointed Richard Scudamore as CEO. He subsequently served the boards of the Football Association (FA) and FL for 12 years, as well as UEFA and the FIFA Marketing Committee 2002–2004. In February 2007 he was mooted as a possible leader of England's bid to host the FIFA World Cup 2018.

Sheepshanks was the founder Chairman of the ITFC Education and Sports Trust, a founder trustee of the Community Foundation for Suffolk, Patron of the Ipswich and East Suffolk branch of the Samaritans and President of the Ipswich Citizens Advice Bureau and as Ambassador to Street League.

Like his predecessors, Patrick and John Cobbold, Peter Hill-Wood (Chairman of Arsenal), and Prince William (President of the Football Association), Sheepshanks is an Old Etonian.

On 16 May 2010, Sheepshanks was appointed joint acting chairman of the FA, along with Roger Burden, following the resignation of Lord Triesman. His term ended with David Bernstein's permanent appointment in January 2011.

Since 2008, Sheepshanks has led and overseen the development and opening of the FA National Football Centre at St George's Park. Opened in October 2012 by the Duke and Duchess of Cambridge, this is now the educational hub for English football, specialising in Coach Education, Leadership Development and High Performance. It is also the training home of all 24 England teams.

== Honours ==
- In 2006, he was awarded the Honorary degree of Doctor of Civil Law (DCL) by the University of East Anglia (UEA) for services to the community.
- He was made a Deputy Lieutenant of the County of Suffolk.
- He was appointed Commander of the Order of the British Empire (CBE) in the 2013 New Years Honours List for services to football and for charitable services in Suffolk.
