= History of printing in Ipswich =

History of printing in the town of Ipswich, Suffolk

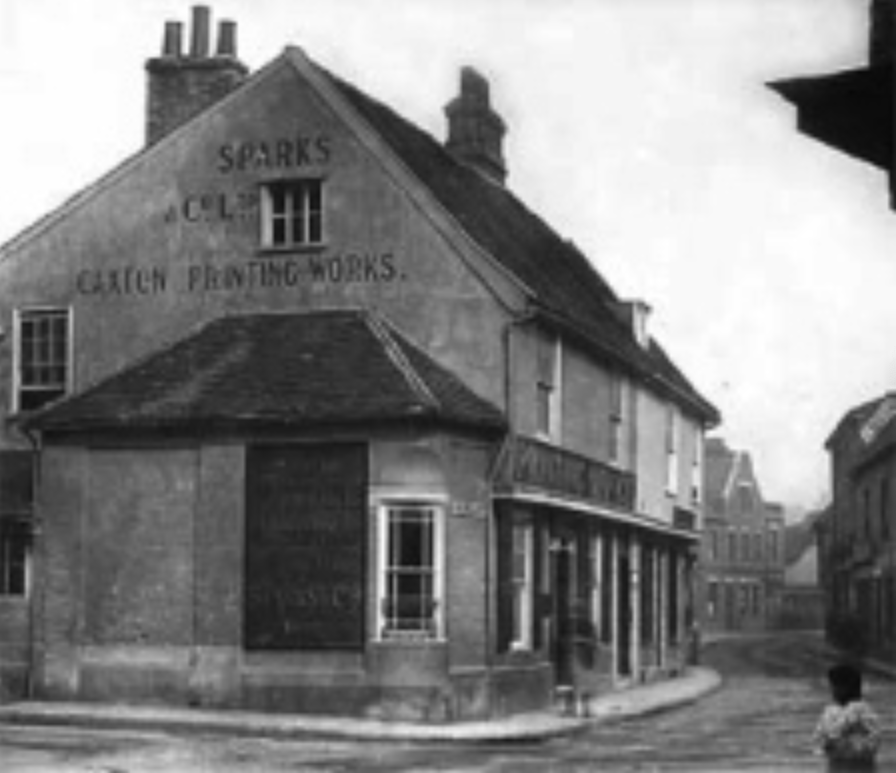
Sparks and Co. Caxton Printing Works, St Nicholas Street circa 1900, photograph by Harry Walters

The history of printing in Ipswich, Suffolk dates back to the sixteenth century. The oldest extant printed book published in Ipswich is an edition of Historia Evangelica by Juvencus published in 1534. However this book was printed in Antwerp. In 1547 and 1548, there was a sudden increase in printing in Ipswich. For many years it was thought that this was the work of three printers, but more recent research has indicated there were but two, the third being a false imprint for books printed in continental Europe.

== Reginald Oliver ==
The earliest record of a "stationer", i.e. someone involved in the various activities of publishing, printing, bookbinding as well as the sale of books and writing materials is that of Reginald Oliver. In the oldest extant book which claimed Ipswich as its place of publication in 1534 includes the sentence "Vxneunt Gypsuici in foro piscario, per Reginaldum Oliuerium" (Sold at Ipswich in the Fish Market by Reginald Oliver). However this book was not printed in Ipswich but rather by Joannes Grapheus of Antwerp. Oliver was himself Dutch, originating in Friesland. But he settled in Ipswich and became a man of substance through his stationery business, which was later carried on by Joyce Oliver.

== Anthony Scoloker ==
Anthony Scoloker established the first printing press in Ipswich in 1548. He had previously been a partner of William Seres in London, but came to Ipswich at the invitation of Richard Argentine.

== John Bagnall ==
Following his arrival in Ipswich in 1720, John Bagnall established a printing business and founded the first paper in Ipswich, the Ipswich Journal.

== W. S. Cowell ==
This company traces its origins in Ipswich back to 1818 when Abraham Kersey Cowell set up his son, Samuel Cowell, as a printer at No.10, The Buttermarket, Ipswich.

== Smiths Suitall ==
This business was founded by Sarah Smith as stationers located at 53 Butter Market in 1880. She was joined by her son, Arthur in 1884 and the company was known as S. Smith & Smith.
