= Richard Argentine =

English physician and divine

Richard Argentine, alias Sexten, M.D, (died 1568), was an English physician and divine.

Argentine went to Ipswich 'in a serving-man's coat,' and afterwards was successively usher and master of Ipswich School, the grammar school in that town. Here he also practised as a physician and read a lecture in divinity. He was created M.D. by the University of Cambridge in 1541.

== Protestant activism ==
With the accession of Edward VI to the throne of England Argentine participated in the consequential enthusiasm for Protestantism. He contributed to the history of printing in Ipswich by inviting Anthony Scoloker to come to the town and establish the first printing press their.

Scoloker printed three of Argentine's books in 1548:

- Certeyne Preceptes, gathered by Hulricus Zuinglius, declaring howe the ingenious youth ought to be instructed and brought unto Christ, Ipswich, 1548, 8vo; A translation from the Latin of Huldrych Zwingli's The Christian Education of Youth
- A ryght notable Sermon made by Doctor Martyn Luther upon the twentieth chapter of Johan of absolution and the true use of the keyes, full of great comforte, Ipswich, 1548, 8vo; a translation, of a sermon, "Predigt am Sonntage nach Ostern" by Martin Luther dedicated to the courtier Thomas Wentworth
- Sermons of the ryght famous and excellent clerke Master Bernardine Ochine, Ipswich, 1548, 8vo; a translation of six sermons by Bernardino Ochino – who had recently found asylum in England. The six sermons are:
1. What thing is God?
2. How to know God by his creatures.
3. If Philosophy serves true Theology or divinity and in what manner.
4. How we ought to use the Holy Scriptures in attaining the knowledge of God.
5. Of the inconveniences that are happened and dayly happē by the abuse of the Holy Scriptures.
6. If to be good divines it behoved us to have the humaine sciences or not.

== Catholic activism ==
Although Argentine's patron, Thomas Wentworth, 1st Baron Wentworth, had attained the post of Lord Chamberlain in 1550, he died in 1551 and was succeeded to the title by Thomas Wentworth, 2nd Baron Wentworth. The 2nd Baron originally persuaded the Ipswich elite to declare Lady Jane Grey Queen of England. However, he promptly defected to join the campaign Queen Mary to succeed Edward. Mary was rallying her supporters at Framlingham Castle, and soon had major local support and was welcomed to Ipswich as she made her way to London. Argentine was amongst many local people who followed 2nd Baron Wentworth. Indeed, he became a prominent local Catholic activist.

In 1555 he became an advocate for the learning of the Arabic language in England. He delivered a lecture at both Oxford and Cambridge universities arguing that the study of Arabic would help the development of medicine. A manuscript of his lecture, Ad Oxonienses et Cantabrigienses pro lingua Arabica beneficio principum restituenda has been preserved in the Bodleian Library.

Having lost his wife, he had himself ordained and was conspicuous by his advocacy of Catholic principles, and by persecuting the reformers. He was appointed parish priest at both St Helen's and St Clement's, Ipswich, in 1556. At the same time he continued in his role as schoolmaster at Ipswich School. He was appointed parish priest at both St Helen's and St Clement's, Ipswich, in 1556. At the same time he continued in his role as schoolmaster at Ipswich School. In 1557 he gained two more benefices: St Mary's Whitton and St Michael's Brantham. The later he gained from the sponsorship of Robert Wingfield, an ardent local catholic who had he played host at his Ipswich home to Queen Mary during her journey to London. Argentine is mentioned in Foxe's Book of Martyrs in relation to the persecution of Agnes Wardall in July 1556.

== Reversion to protestantism ==
Shortly before the death of Queen Mary in 1558 he moved to London. Following the accession Elizabeth he retained his rectory by again becoming a Protestant. In January 1563-4 he appears to have been living at Exeter, but the statement that he was a prebendary of Exeter and Wells is without foundation. He probably died in 1568, when his rectory at Ipswich became vacant.

== Other works ==
- De Præstigiis et Incantationibus Dæmonum et Necromanticorum, Bâle, 1568, 8vo.
- Observations about Rome and the popes.
