= Ann Candler =

Ann Candler (1740–1814) was a poet, known as "The Suffolk Cottager", whose works appeared in the Ipswich Journal and a volume published toward the end of her life.

== Life ==
Ann More was born at Yoxford, Suffolk, 18 November 1740, one of the children of William More, a glover there; her mother was a daughter of Thomas Holder of Woodbridge, the surveyor of the window-lights for that part of the county. In 1750 her father moved to Ipswich, where his wife died in 1751.

Ann taught herself to read and write, and studied all accessible travels, plays, and romances. In 1762 she married Candler, a cottager in Sproughton, a village about three miles out of Ipswich. From 1763 to 1766 Candler served in the militia (Poetical Attempts, p. 5), and this service, combined with the man's drinking habits, kept Ann and her growing family poor.

In 1777 Candler enlisted in the line; Ann was forced to put four of her six children into the workhouse, and was herself upon a sick bed for eleven weeks. In 1780, after a brief visit to her husband in London, she took refuge in Tattingstone workhouse, where she gave birth to twin sons on 20 March 1781; she wrote one of her poems on their deaths a few weeks after. In 1783, when Candler came back discharged, she joined him for a time; but illness made them both return to the workhouse, whence Candler dismissed himself in six months, and Ann never saw him again.

Ann Candler died on 6 September 1814, at Holton, Suffolk, aged 74.

== Works ==
In the workhouse, Ann Candler worked on the short poems for which she is known. The Ipswich Journal published one in March 1785, "On the Death of a Most Benevolent Gentleman" (Metcalfe Russell of Sproughton); she wrote one in 1787 "To the Inhabitants of Yoxford"; one in 1788 to a woman who had befriended her, "An Invitation to Spring", and another spring song to the same woman in 1789.

The Ipswich Journal (17 September 1814) attributed the following poems also to her; "A Paraphrase of the 5th chap. of the 2nd Book of Kings"; the "History of Joseph, in an Address to a Young Man"; and the "Life of Elijah the Prophet", which probably appeared in the Journal from 1790 onwards. By 1800 it was proposed to publish a short volume of Ann Candler's work by subscription; and by 24 May 1802 she was under a roof of her own at Copdock, just by Sproughton, near a married daughter. A book was created with local writer Elizabeth Cobbold serving as editor. Her book, Poetical Attempts was published at Ipswich in 1803.

== See also ==
- List of 18th-century British working-class writers
