= Steam Packet Inn, Ipswich =

Pub in Ipswich, Suffolk

Coordinates: 52°03′09″N 1°09′52″E

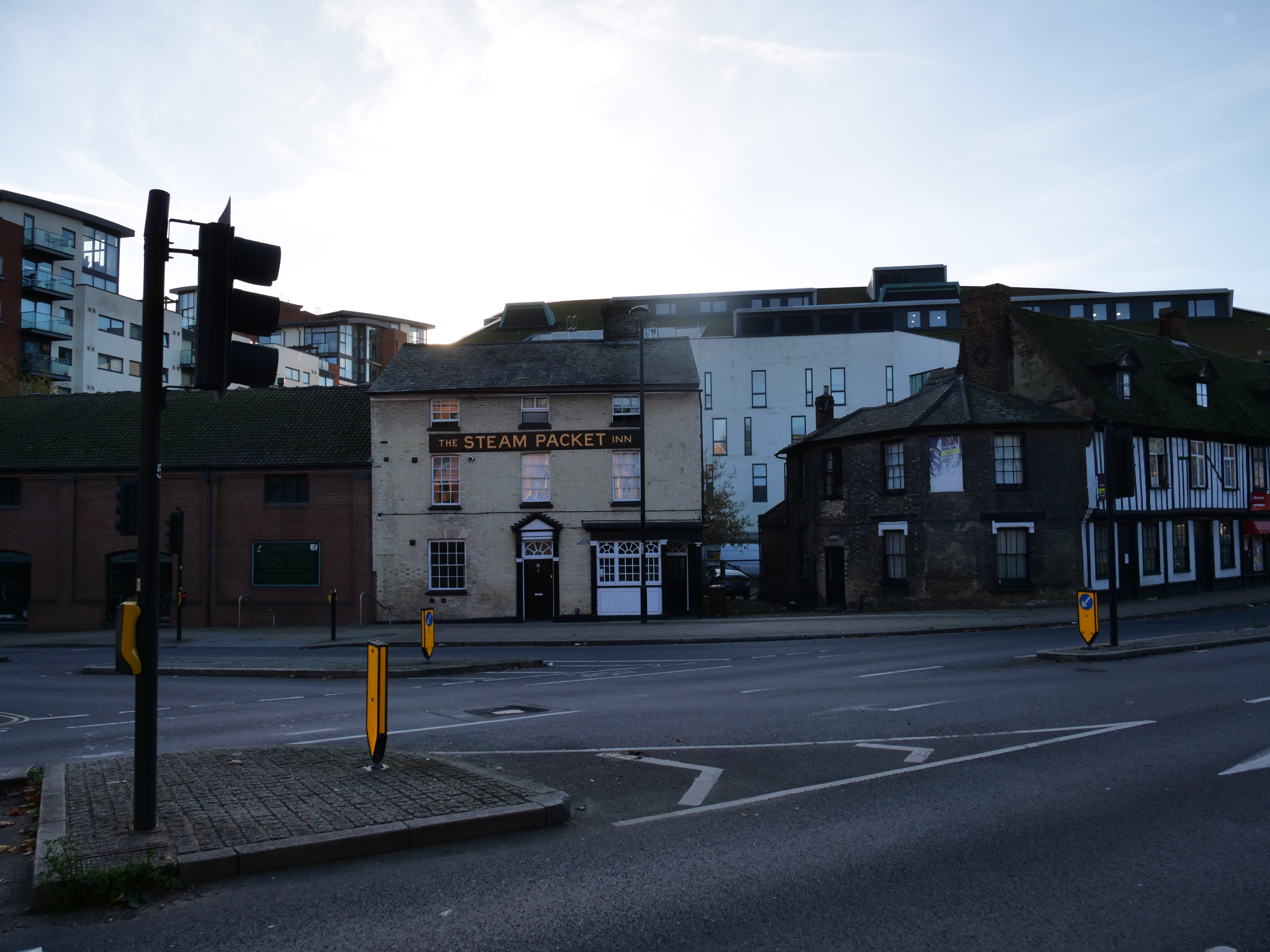
The Steam Packet, October 2019

The Steam Packet Inn was a public house located at 2/4 Duke Street, Ipswich, Suffolk, England. It closed on 18 September 1960. The building had been owned by Cobbold Brewery but after closure it was sold to Eastern Counties Farmers (ECF). The grade II listed building is now used as student accommodation.
