= John Cobbold (1774–1860) =

English businessman, banker and brewer active in Ipswich (1774–1860)

John Wilkinson Cobbold (1774–1860) was an English businessman, banker and brewer active in Ipswich.

He was the first son of John Cobbold and Elizabeth Wilkinson, who together had 15 children before Elizabeth's death in 1790. His father remarried Elizabeth Knipe better known as the writer Elizabeth Cobbold.

As a young man John Cobbold was given responsibility for the family brewery at Eye, Suffolk. Here he became involved in local politics. After the death of his father in 1835, he took over running the business in Ipswich. He joined the banking firm of Bacon, Cobbold & Co. He became the largest merchant and ship-owner in the area, trading in the Corn, Coal and Malt. At the time, the Cliff Brewery he ran was one of the largest breweries outside London, also carrying on a considerable trade in the Wine and Spirit. He also owned several other large farms and brickyards. The number of people he employed overall amounted to several hundred.
