= John Dupuis Cobbold =

British politician (1861–1929)

John Dupuis Cobbold (11 March 1861, Ipswich – 12 June 1929, Ipswich) was a member of the Ipswich-based Cobbold family in England.

John was born at The Cliff, Ipswich. He was the son of John Patteson Cobbold and Adele Harriette Dupuis, daughter of George Dupuis, vice-provost of Eton College, where he was educated from 1874 to 1879. Here he played Rackets, winning several school contests and becoming Keeper of Rackets for 1878–79.

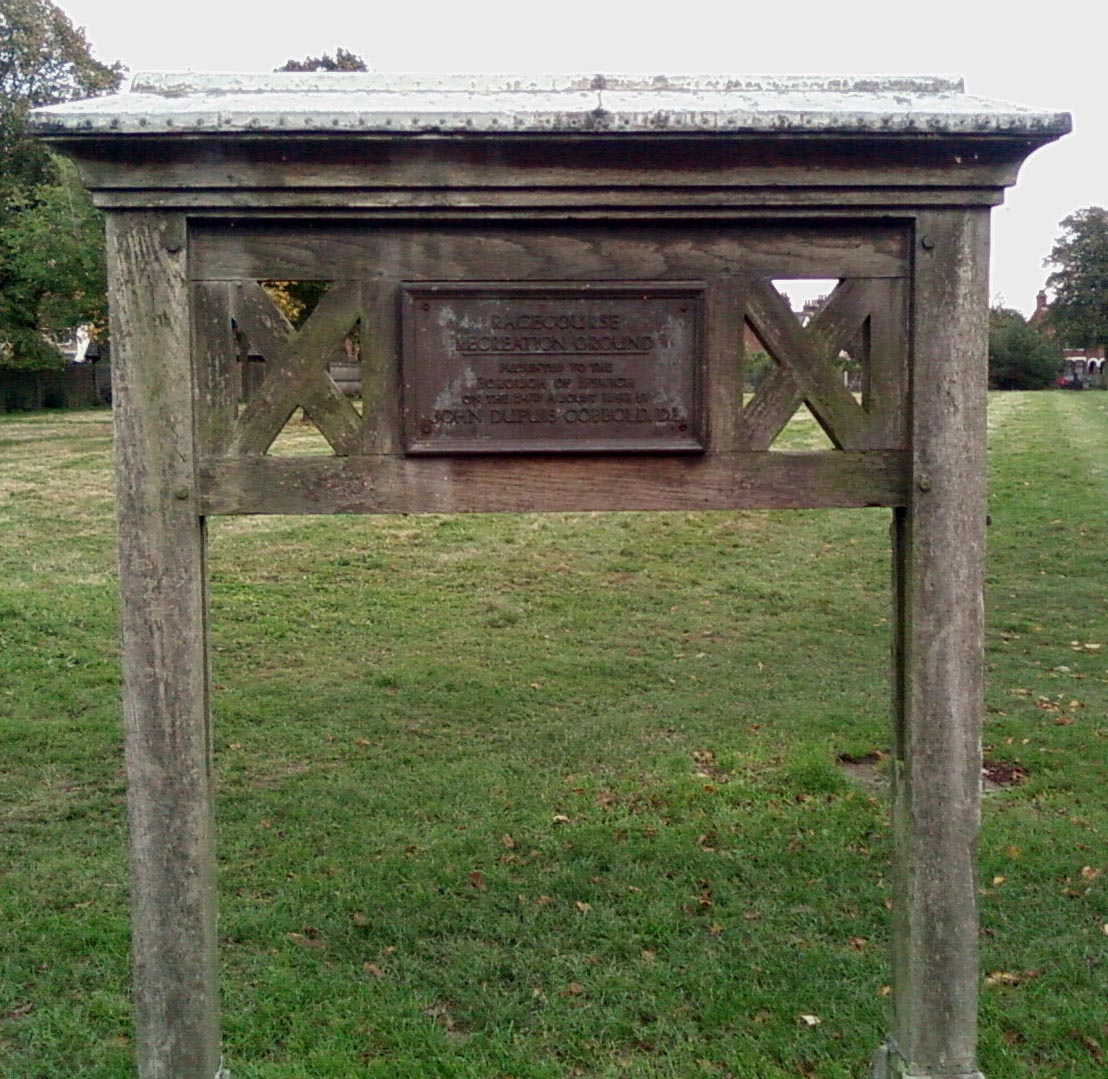
"Racecourse Recreation Ground presented to the Borough of Ipswich on the 24th August 1897, by John Dupuis Cobbold, D.L."

On 24 August 1897 he presented the Racecourse Recreation Ground to the Ipswich Borough.

He was appointed High Sheriff of Suffolk in 1901 and was Mayor of Ipswich, 1914–15.

He joined Ipswich Fine Art Club in 1913 and remained a member until 1928 despite not exhibiting.

He married at All Saints' Church, Cairo, Egypt on 23 April 1891, Lady Evelyn Murray (17 July 1867–January 1963), eldest daughter of Charles Murray, 7th Earl of Dunmore and they had three children,

- Winifred Evelyn (1892–1965), married Major Algernon Ryder Lambart Sladen, grandson of Frederick Lambart, 8th Earl of Cavan.
- Ivan Cobbold (1897–1944), married Blanche Katharine Cavendish, daughter of Victor Cavendish, 9th Duke of Devonshire. They had issues;
  - John Cavendish Cobbold.
  - Patrick Cobbold.
- Pamela Cobbold (1900–1932), married Charles Jocelyn Hambro.
  - Charles Hambro, Baron Hambro.

He died at Holywells Park, Ipswich on 12 June 1929 aged 68 and is buried in the graveyard of St Martin's church, Trimley St Martin, Suffolk.
