= Charles Jocelyn Hambro =

British military officer and banker (1897–1963)

Sir Charles Jocelyn Hambro KBE MC
- Born: 3 October 1897; Kensington, London
- Died: 28 August 1963 (aged 65); Regent's Park, London
- Relatives: Sir Eric Hambro (father); Charles Hambro, Baron Hambro (son)
- Military career
- Rank: Air Commodore
- Units: Coldstream Guards; Special Operations Executive
- Commands: Head of the Special Operations Executive
- Conflicts: First World War; Second World War
- Awards: Military Cross
- Other work: Merchant Banker

Air Commodore Sir Charles Jocelyn Hambro, KBE MC (3 October 1897 – 28 August 1963) was a British merchant banker and intelligence officer.

== Life ==
Hambro was born into a banking family of Danish Jewish origin which had settled in Dorset and the City of London in the early 19th century. He was the son of Sir Eric Hambro, a partner in C. J. Hambro & Son (later to become Hambros Bank) and a Conservative Member of Parliament for Wimbledon between 1900 and 1907.

Between 1910 and 1915, he was educated at Eton College, joining the cricket team in 1914 and becoming the Captain in 1915. After leaving Eton he immediately went to the Royal Military College, Sandhurst, being made an ensign in the Coldstream Guards on 22 December 1915. He was immediately posted to the Western Front, serving for two years as an officer until demobilisation. Promoted to lieutenant on 10 July 1916 (back-dated to 9 June 1916), he was awarded the Military Cross on 26 September 1917 for conspicuous bravery in action. His citation reads as follows:

For conspicuous gallantry and devotion to duty. Accompanied by a private, he crossed to the enemy's side of a canal and rescued two wounded men, one of whom was unable to walk, from close under the enemy's parapet. Later in the day, he went forward in charge of the leading patrol of an advance, personally accounting for four of the enemy with his revolver and capturing several prisoners with his party. On reaching his objective, he sent back correct and valuable information, and has at all times displayed the utmost coolness and gallantry.

Hambro resigned his commission on 12 August 1919, receiving a regular commission as a reserve officer from the same date. After initial training with the Guaranty Trust Company in New York City (where he and his wife lived with Harry Morgan) he joined his family bank J.C. Hambro & Sons, playing a large part in its merger with Wallenbergs' British Bank of Northern Commerce in 1920, with the combined bank taking the name Hambros Bank in 1921. In 1928, when only 30, Hambro was elected a director of the Bank of England, and between 1932 and 1933 he put all work outside the bank to one side to work on establishing the bank's exchange control division under the direction of Montagu C. Norman, the Bank of England director. In 1937 Hambro was asked to succeed Norman as director, but he turned it down as he was suffering from oral cancer, although surgical operations and radiotherapy later helped him recover.

At the outbreak of the Second World War, Hambro was placed in charge of activities in Scandinavia, arranging smuggling, intelligence networks and sabotage operations. After the fall of France in June 1940, Hambro was made a colonel on the General Staff and was asked by Ronald Cross to join the Ministry of Economic Warfare, a cover organisation for the Special Operations Executive (SOE). The SOE was charged with creating "a spirit of resistance in occupied territories". Through his contact with Ebbe Munck, an anti-Nazi journalist, Hambro linked up with the Danish resistance, and was knighted as a Knight Commander of the Order of the British Empire for his work in 1941. Hambro refused to accept any wages for his military work during wartime.

Between December 1940 and November 1941, Hambro was also in charge of overseeing the French, Belgian, German and Dutch sections of the SOE, and from November 1941 he was deputy leader of SOE for 5 months. In 1942 he succeeded in persuading the British and Norwegian organisations to form a planning commission, which was instrumental in devising Operation Grouse and Operation Swallow, important parts of the Norwegian heavy water sabotage missions. By this time Hambro was on the executive committee of the SOE, and was promoted to Air Commodore. Roundell Palmer, now head of the SOE, appointed him to succeed Frank Nelson. His first major action as head of the SOE was to meet with Colonel William Joseph Donovan, the head of the OSS and his opposite number. A disagreement over actions in the Middle East led Hambro to resign in 1943.

For the rest of the war he acted as head of the "British raw materials mission" in Washington; a cover for exchanging information and technology between Britain and the United States which led to the detonation of the first Atomic Bomb as part of the Manhattan Project. He was part of Operation Harborage in Germany investigating the German nuclear program, when he wore the uniform of his World War I unit, the Coldstream Guards.

After the war Hambro returned to the city, assuming responsibility for the companies with which Hambros were associated. On the death of his uncle, Olaf Hambro, in 1961 he became chairman of Hambros Bank. Whilst maintaining close connection to commerce in Scandinavia, he extended the Bank's interests to Africa and Asia.

== Family ==
In 1919, Hambro married Pamela Cobbold, daughter of John Dupuis Cobbold (1861–1929), grandson of John Chevalier Cobbold (1797–1882); and Zainab Cobbold.

Together they had four children:

- Cynthia Hambro (1921–1986), married Maj. Michael Ian Leslie-Melville in 1943
- Diana Hambro (b. 1922), married David Gibson-Watt, Baron Gibson-Watt in 1942
- Pamela Hambro (b. 1925), married Capt. Robin William Lowe in 1945 (divorced 1951), married Andrew Gibson-Watt (brother of David, above) in 1951
- Charles Hambro, Baron Hambro (1930–2002)

The family settled at Delcombe Manor near Milton Abbey. Pamela died in 1932, of infection following a hunting accident. In 1934, Hambro built the village hall for Winterborne Stickland to replace its Reading Room, which had been sold off with the rest of the Milton Abbey estate, and named it after his late wife.

In 1936, Hambro remarried: his second wife was Dorothy Helen Mackay: her first husband had been Marcus Wallenberg Jr. They went on to have a daughter, Sally, thus a half-sibling of Peter Wallenberg Sr. and Marc Wallenberg. She is the second wife and widow of the late Anthony Brand, 6th Viscount Hampden.

A relative, Carl Joachim Hambro, (the younger) was a politician and civil servant in Norway and in exile during World War II in Sweden. He served as President of the Parliament at the time of the German invasion.

Honorary titles
Preceded by Sir Ernest Benn, Bt	High Sheriff of the County of London; 1933–1934	Succeeded by Victor Blagden
Preceded by William Acton	High Sheriff of the County of London; 1956–1957	Succeeded by Sir Patrick Cooper
