= Charles Cox (businessman, died 1808) =

English businessman

Charles Cox (c. 1731 – 7 April 1808) was a prominent English businessman active in Harwich, Essex. He was mayor of Harwich Corporation six times: 1778, 1784, 1789, 1793, 1798, and 1803. He was an agent for the Harwich packet boat.

Cox had an enduring working relationship with John Cobbold (1746–1835) after the latter inherited the Cobbold family brewing business in 1767. In 1770, they went into partnership, leasing the Cobbold's family brewery from Sarah Cobbold, John's mother. They founded a private bank together, which became Cox, Cobbold & Co., also known as the Harwich Bank. For many years, this bank had the same partners as another bank, Bacon, Cobbold & Co., of Ipswich.

== Death ==
He was interred in the family vault St Nicholas Church, Harwich, alongside his son, also Charles Cox, who had died age 5, and two grandchildren, Charles and Mary-Ann Cox, both children of his son Anthony Cox and Mary-Anne Cox.
