= St Helen's Church, Ipswich =

Coordinates: 52.056°N 1.165°E

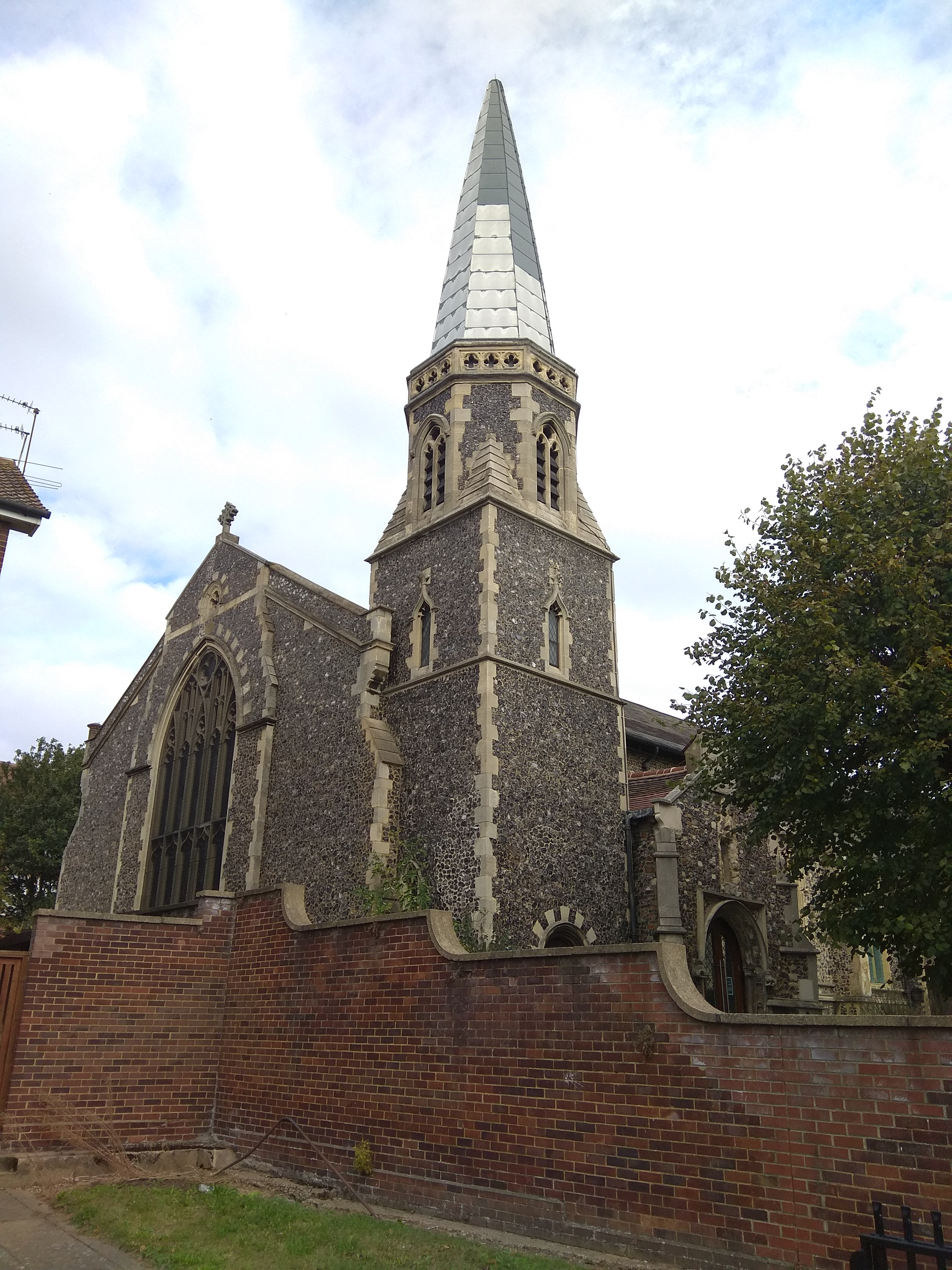
- St Helen's Church, 2018

- Location in Suffolk
- Location: Ipswich, Suffolk
- Country: England
- Denomination: Anglican

History
- Founded: 11th century

Specifications
- Materials: Knapped flint rubble

St Helen's Church, Ipswich is an Anglican church in Ipswich, Suffolk, England. The church is built from knapped flint rubble with additional stone and white brick dressings. Although some of the building dates back to the medieval period, the building was substantially altered in the nineteenth century.

== History ==
William Swarston, a married minister, was incumbent when Queen Mary succeeded in seizing the throne in 1553. However, when the government initiated a campaign against married clergy, and in 1554 he was replaced by William Barker. Then in 1556 the erstwhile protestant propagandist turned ardent Catholic, Richard Argentine was the incumbent here following his taking Holy Orders. He is mentioned in Foxe's Book of Martyrs in relation to the persecution of Agnes Wardall in July 1556.
