= St George's Park National Football Centre =

English football training ground

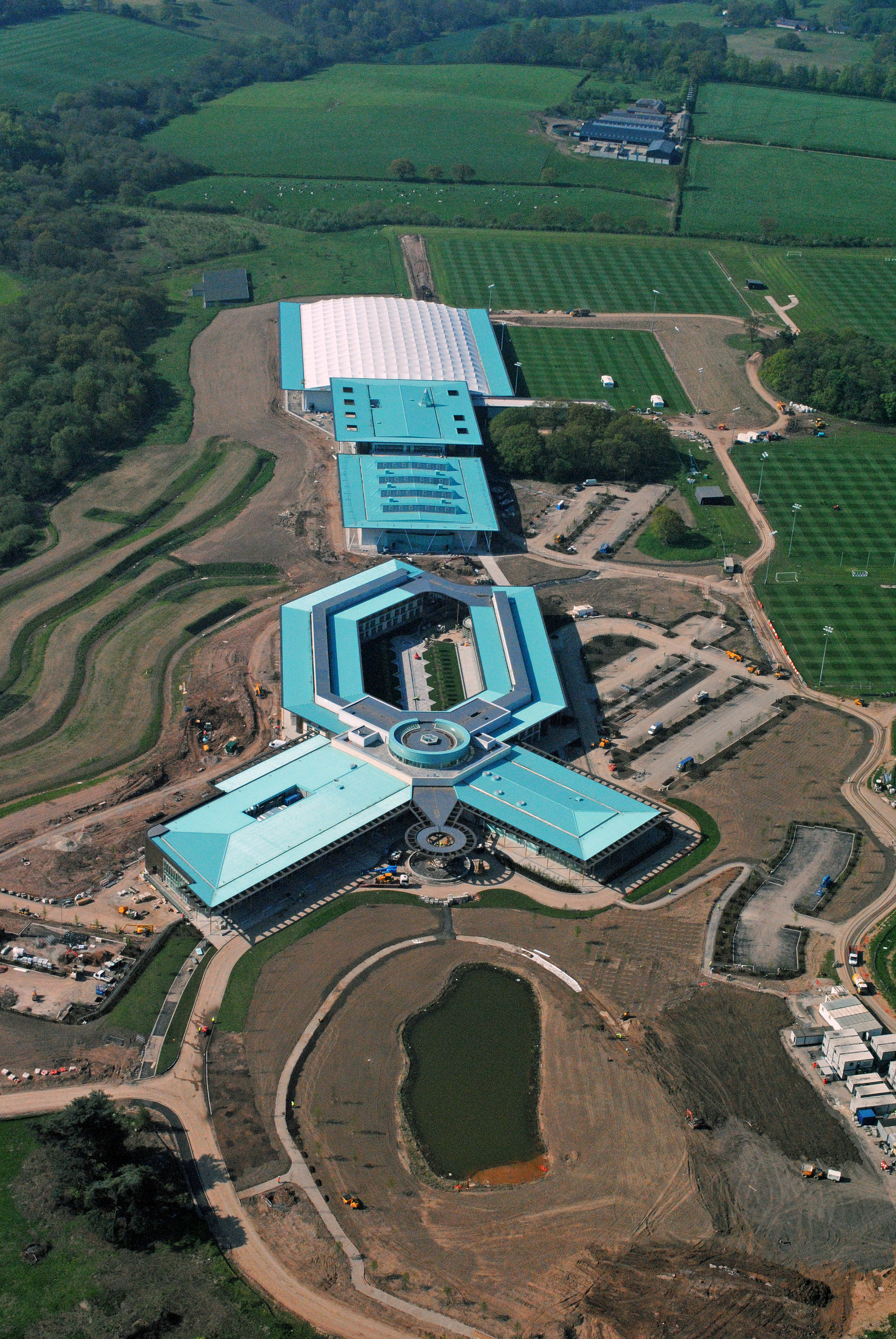
- Established: 9 October 2012 (official opening)
- Chair: David Sheepshanks
- Address: Newborough Road, Needwood, Burton upon Trent, Staffordshire, DE13 9PD
- Location: Burton upon Trent, Staffordshire, England
- Coordinates: 52.809°N 1.756°W
- Interactive map of St George's Park National Football Centre
- Website: https://www.englandfootball.com/england/st-georges-park

St George's Park (SGP) is the English Football Association's national football centre (NFC) built on a 330-acre (130 ha) site at Burton upon Trent, Staffordshire. The centre was officially opened by the Duke and Duchess of Cambridge on 9 October 2012.

The purpose of the centre is to be the base for all coaching and development work undertaken by the FA, and to be the training and preparation ground for all 28 of the England national football teams at the same time, including disability, futsal and those who compete in UEFA and FIFA competitions such as:

- Men's Senior, U-21, U-20, U-19 and U-17.
- Women's Senior, U-21, U-19 and U-17.

== History ==
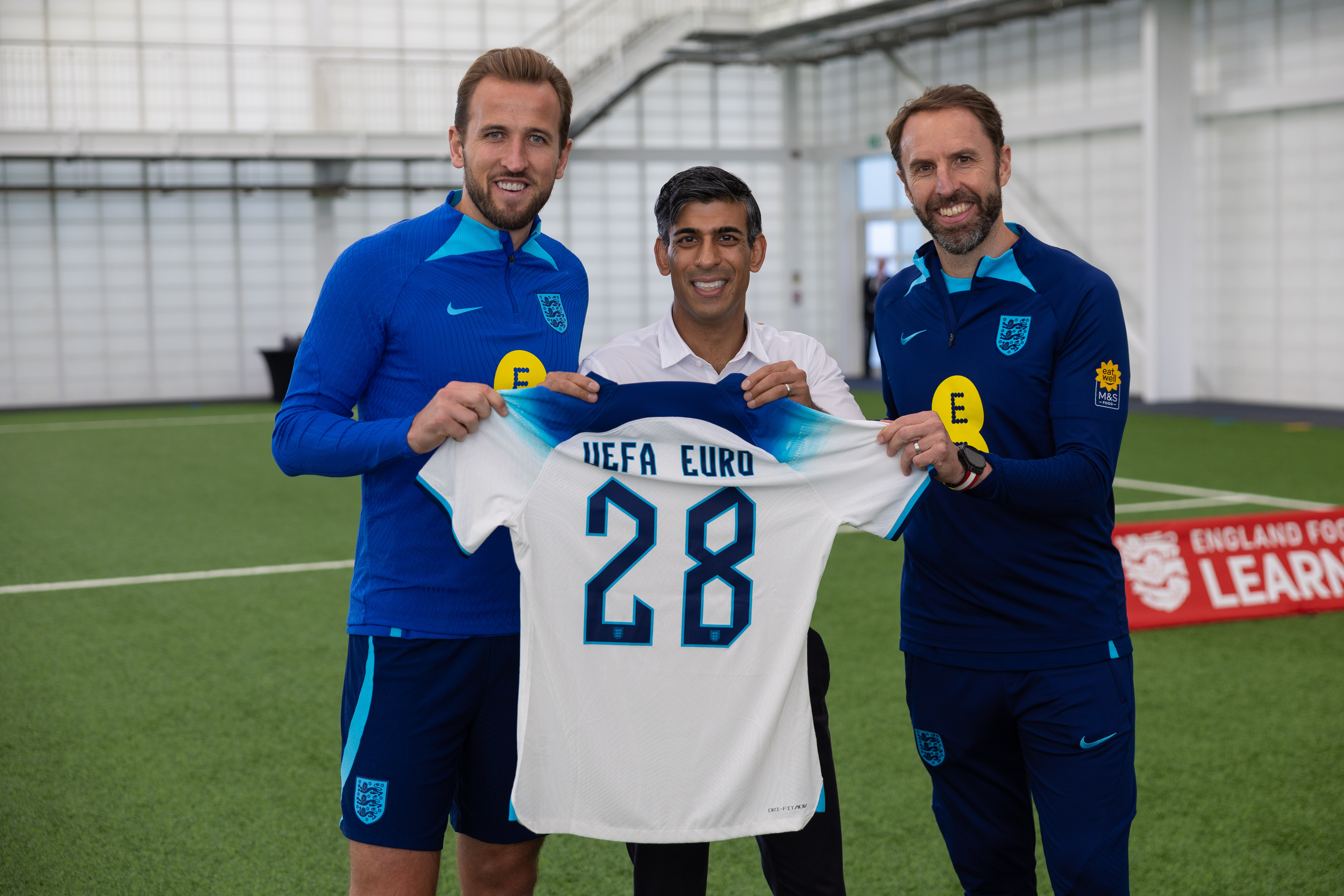
Harry Kane, Rishi Sunak and Gareth Southgate at St. George's Park in 2023, announcing that the UEFA Euro 2028 tournament would be “coming home” to the United Kingdom and Ireland

Originally part of Needwood Forest, the hunting grounds were developed by the Berkeley family in the 13th century. After passing into the hands of the crown, in the 1700s the lease again became owned by private individuals. Passing to the Bass family in 1850, the country house was redeveloped in the 1870s, after which an extensive horse racing stud was developed. After the death of Sir William Bass, 2nd Baronet in 1952, the estate was sold off and the house demolished.

== Purchase and planning ==
In August 1972 a FA national coaching centre was planned at Annesley Hall, Nottinghamshire.

By January 1976, the FA had lost interest in Annesley Hall, and was looking at the British campus of Ambassador College at Hanstead House in Hertfordshire, owned by the Radio Church of God. This Hertfordshire site was later bought by the Central Electricity Generating Board as a training centre. The FA bought Annesley Hall around 1974. The FA sold 120 acres of Annesley Hall around 1977. It would cost around £5m to develop the Annesley site.

In November 1976 the Sports Council said it would fund a £1.25m centre at Shropshire. By November 1977, the FA would contribute £500,000 to the new site in Shropshire. Construction would start in October 1978, to finish in mid-1980, with two new pitches, and a synthetic pitch, and a three-storey building for 80 people. The Duke of Kent opened the £3m new training centre and £1m residential block, known as Kent Hall on Thursday April 9 1981.

Before the proposed development, the FA had two streams of development facilities:

- Lilleshall Hall had provided coaching for England's best young players, but had been superseded from both a facility and commercial viewpoint by numerous youth academies opened by various football clubs
- Bisham Abbey is a multi-sport complex which the FA had used for preparing the national team for matches. The FA wanted a purpose-built, state-of-the-art complex reserved solely for football.

Following research by FA technical director Howard Wilkinson, the FA bought the 350-acre (140 ha) site for £2m in 2001 from the Forte Hotels division of Granada Leisure plc.

Having researched all existing National Football Centres, Wilkinson's project was based on the French system located at Clairefontaine near Paris, which nurtured the 1998 World Cup and 2000 European Championship winners. It would provide the base for Wilkinson and the FA coaching staff to look for and develop the future generations of England stars. The centre's facilities would include 14 pitches, and provide facilities and headquarters from national teams from the age of 14 upwards.

Following the departure of FA Chief Executive Adam Crozier, the FA reviewed their plans in November 2002. Due to escalating costs at Wembley Stadium, the FA were expected to place an additional £100m into that project. On review, the costs of the national football centre were also revised upwards to £80m. As a result, although the plans were approved, the deadline was relaxed to allow for the difficult financing circumstances.

In 2003 it was decided to mothball the project; in 2004 a proposal to drop the project was delayed until spring 2005. In September 2006 the FA board agreed not to invest any further funds into the site until a decision was made on how to proceed, with all options from a sale, to development with partners, open to discussion. Pitches had already been laid, but construction work on the outbuildings and dressing rooms had not started.

In early 2008 the plans were resurrected, with Trevor Brooking calling for the project to be finished by 2010, stating that without a national football centre "the England coach's job will get that much harder." In 2010 Sam Wallace, a football journalist for The Independent wrote: "The problem for the FA is that as long as it sits there unfinished, Burton is a stick which the FA's critics use to beat it."

== Design and facilities ==
After the project was finally approved in 2008, SGP was designed by Red Box Design Group, who also designed the Sunderland Aquatic Centre, Sunderland Football Club's Academy of Light and Durham County Cricket Club's Riverside Ground. The centre has 12 world-class training pitches, with both grass and artificial surfaces, one of which is an exact replica of the surface used at Wembley Stadium, and a full-sized indoor pitch. It also has state-of-the-art hydrotherapy suites, biomechanics and training gyms, video analysis amenities, educational and coaching suites and medical and sport science facilities. It was built by Bowmer + Kirkland and completed in 2012.

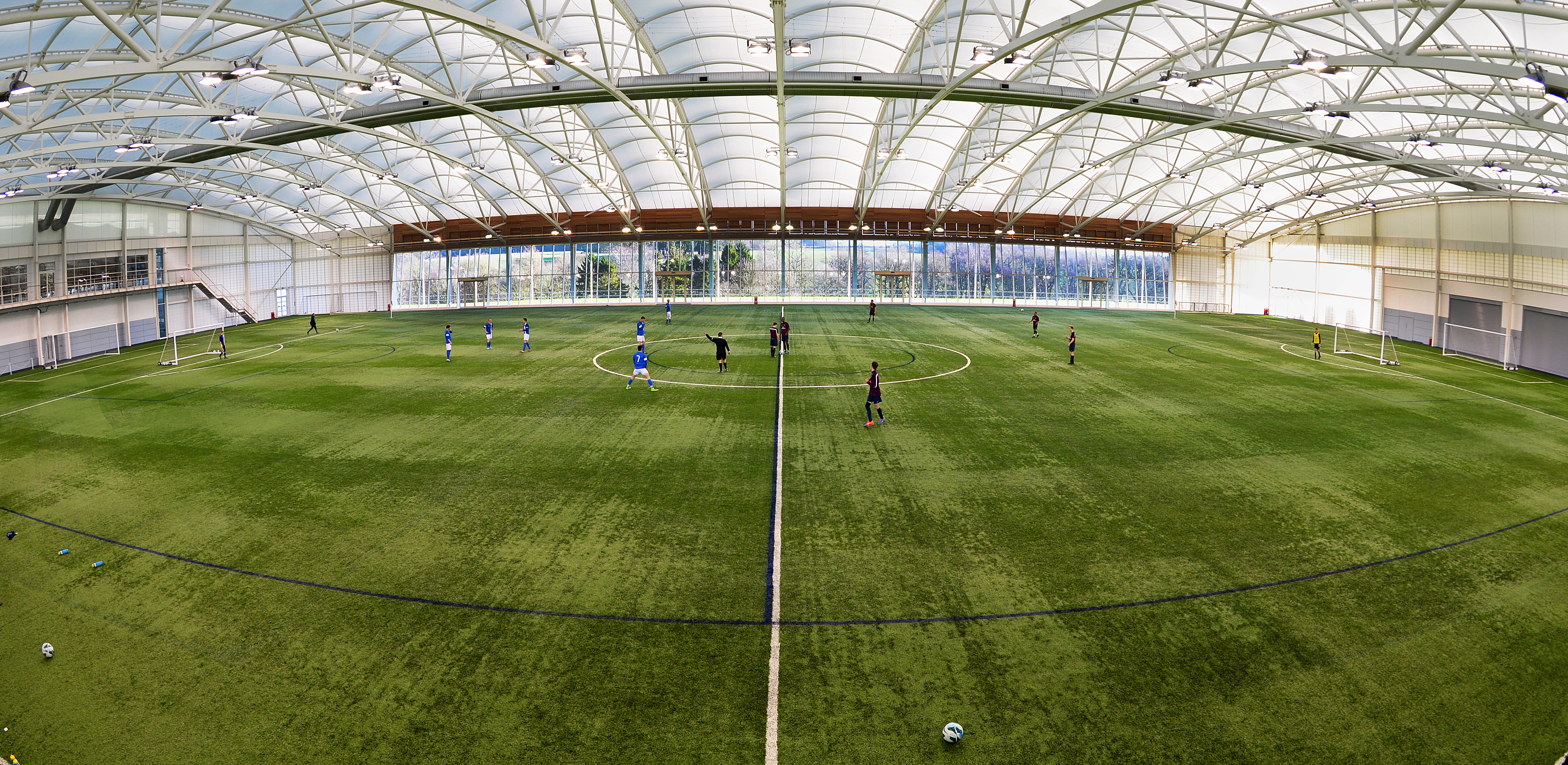
Indoor pitch

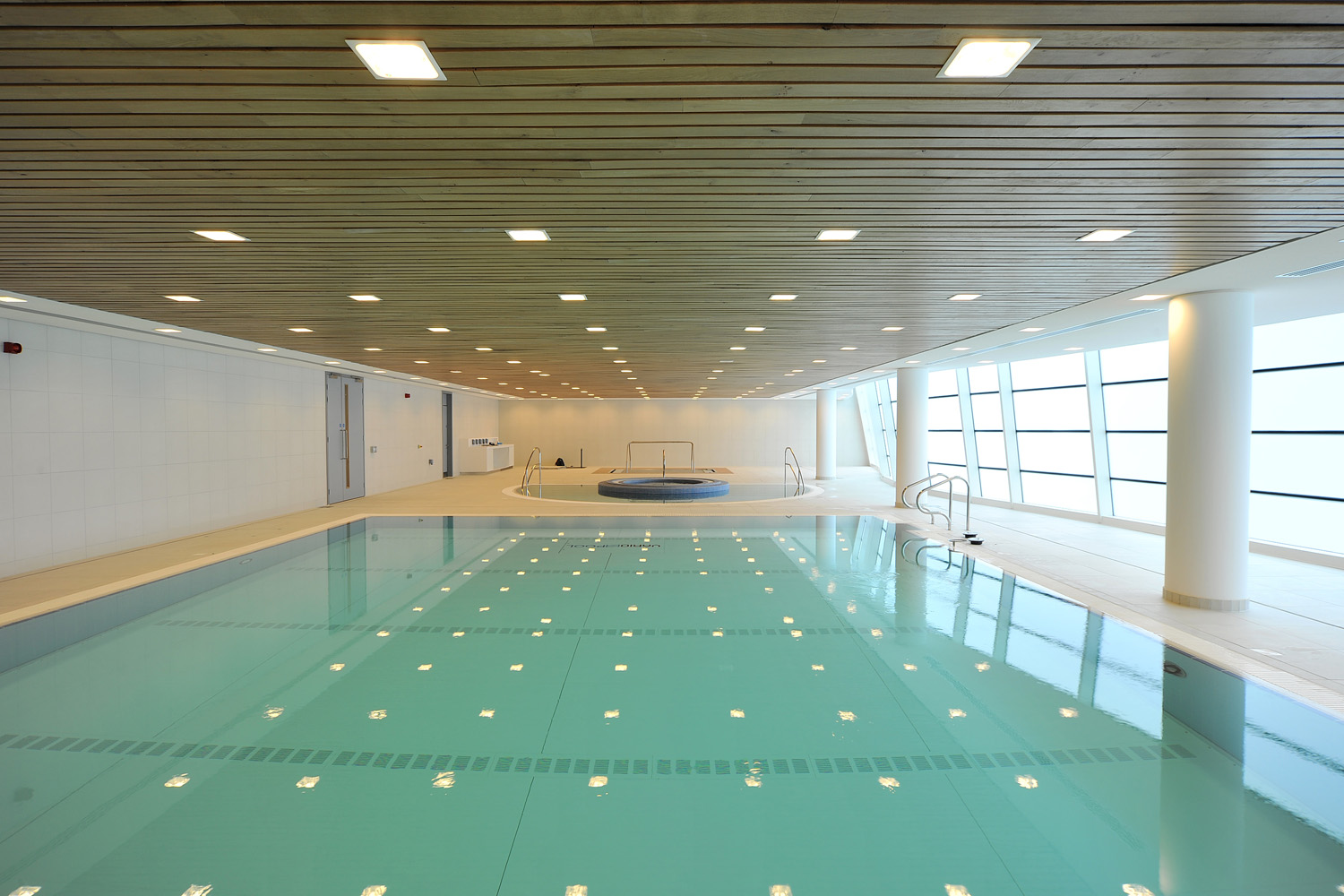
Hydrotherapy suite

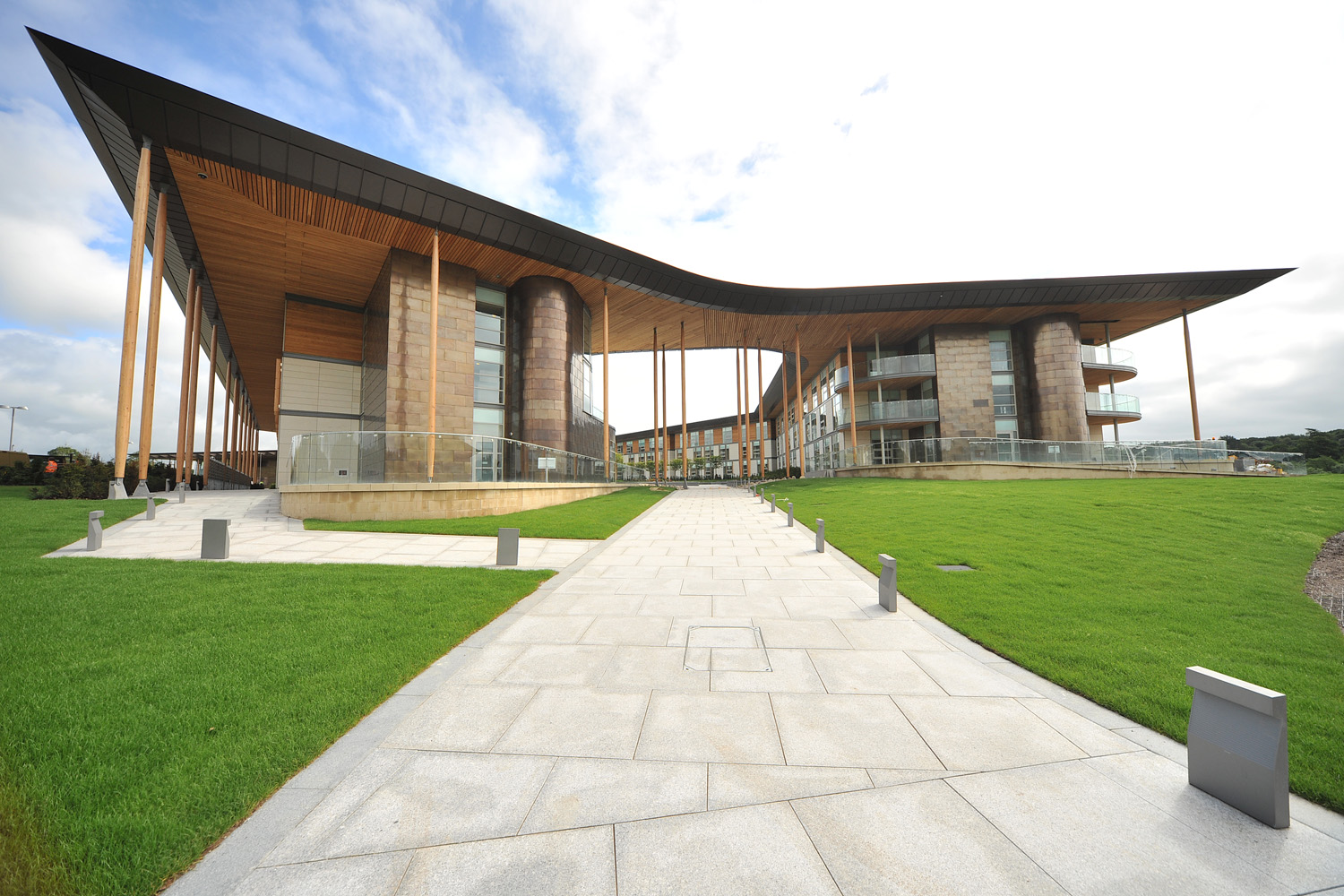
Hilton at St. George’s Park

== Sponsorship ==
In September 2012 it was announced that SGP would be sponsored by Nike as part of a new deal with the England team starting in 2013.

== Use ==
The project's chairman, David Sheepshanks, said: "Our aim is to make St George's Park a sporting destination of choice for coaches, players, administrators and officials".

The intention is that it will be the training base for 24 England teams. It will act as the focal point for the FA's coaching and player development work. The national football centre will also include offices for the FA's technical experts and accommodation for 300 and sports science and medicine facilities. The League Managers Association committed itself to making the new centre their future headquarters.

The England national rugby union team trained there in October 2012 and January 2021.

Former European Cup winners Steaua Bucharest used the facilities of the St George's Park for their pre-season 2013–14 training camp. Galatasaray and AS Monaco have also used it In March 2014 MLS team Minnesota United FC trained at the facility.

The England national rugby league team has also trained there in May 2015.

FC Barcelona trained there in July 2014 and 2016.

In 2018 it hosted five matches in the group stages of the European Under-17 Championships.

It also hosted a Rugby Sevens tournament between Great Britain, Ireland and the United States of America, as a warmup for the Rugby Sevens tournament at the 2020 Olympics.

Jilly Cooper, novelist, visited the centre as part of her research for her 2023 novel Tackle!

In March 2026, St George’s Park hosted England’s UEFA European Under-17 Championship qualifying group matches against the Faroe Islands (3–0), Israel (1–3), and Estonia (2–0).
