= 1876 Ipswich by-election =

UK Parliamentary by-election

The 1876 Ipswich by-election was fought on 1 January 1876. The by-election was fought due to the death of the incumbent Conservative MP, John Cobbold. It was won by his younger brother the Conservative candidate Thomas Cobbold.

Ipswich by-election, 1876
Party	Candidate	Votes	%	±%
Conservative	Thomas Cobbold	2,213	57.9	+2.9
Lib-Lab	William Newton	1,607	42.1	+3.0
Majority		606	15.8	+12.8
Turnout		3,820	56.3	
Conservative hold		Swing	+3.0	
