= National football centre =

Association football facility

A national football centre (NFC) (or soccer institute) is the facilities that host an education base for a national football association.

The Canadian Soccer Association has a series of "national training centres" in each province where prospective football players are invited to be coached by professional coaches.

The Football Association of England operates the St George's Park National Football Centre.

The French Football Federation has the acclaimed Clairefontaine institute and several other regional academies which attempt to locate the more talented players at an early age, other sites include:

- Centre Régional Accueil Formation de Liévin
- Centre Régional Technique Georges Favre
- Centre Technique Régional Henri Guérin
- CREPS Aix-en-Provence
- CREPS Bourgogne Dijon
- CREPS Plaine des Cafres
- CREPS Reims
- CREPS Vichy Auvergne

The German Football Association opened its new headquarters and central training campus in Frankfurt in June 2022.
