= Eastern Counties Farmers =

English agricultural co-operative

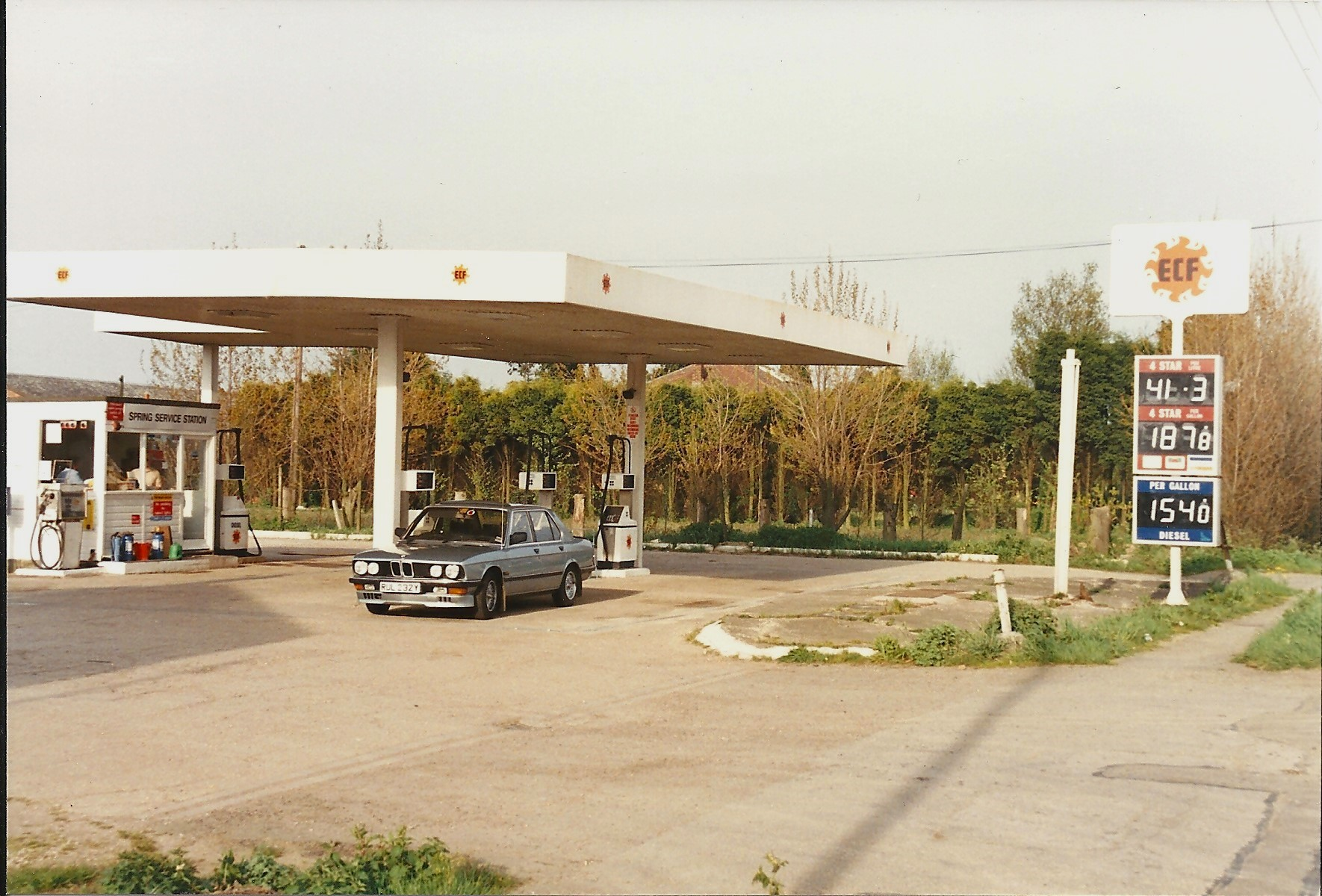
An ECF branded petrol station on A17 in Long Sutton, Lincolnshire in 1989

Eastern Counties Farmers' Cooperative Association, (ECF) was once the United Kingdom’s biggest agricultural co-operative business. It was founded in 1904 (121 years ago) with 158 members that year. By 1909 this number had grown to 889. They were based in Ipswich, and drew most of their members from Suffolk, with additional members in Essex and Norfolk. It attracted large tenant farmers who wanted to re-organise marketing to mitigate falling profits. Unlike smaller agricultural co-operatives in East Anglia ECF catered for a broad range of farm produce and employed experts who gave advice to members and marketed their particular products.

For many years their offices were at 86 Princes Street, Ipswich. In the late 1980s, this property was sold and the companies head office was relocated to Helios House, Saxham Business Park, Saxham, Bury St Edmunds.

In 1955 the co-operative built a grain silo on Neptune Quay, between Fore Street and Coprolite Street, in Ipswich Docks.

In 1991/2 they had 420 employees and four subsidiary companies: Gleave & Key (Norfolk), Glisave and Key (Norfolk), ECF Fuels and (AB Handling).
