= Woolpack Public House, Ipswich =

Pub in Ipswich, Suffolk, England

Coordinates: 52°3′42″N 1°9′36″E

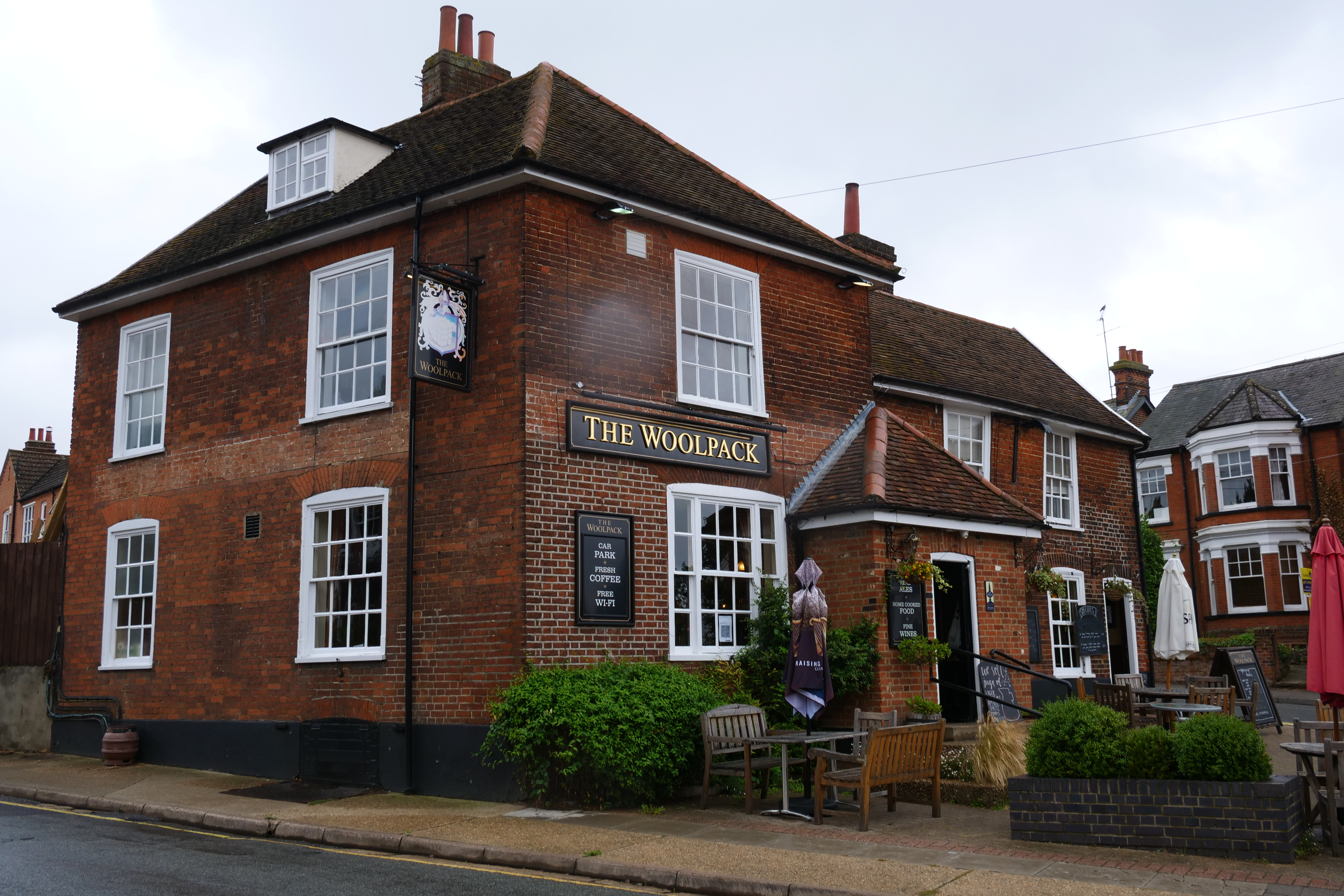
The Woolpack, 2021

The Woolpack Public House is an eighteenth century public house located where Bolton Lane forks into Westerfield Road and Tuddenham Road, in Ipswich, Suffolk, England. It is a Grade II listed building and has an 18th century facade made of red bricks, but the interior is most likely of an earlier date.

The pub started out as a country inn, located just by a toll-gate which stood at the top of Bolton Lane. Visitors to Ipswich were charged a toll for their carriages and carts. However, many farmers avoided the fee by stabling their horses at the stables provided by the Woolpack, with their vehicles parked in Westerfield or Tuddenham Road.

== Woolpack Identity Area ==
The Woolpack Identity Area was designated by Ipswich Borough Council as one of four identity areas within the Christchurch Street Conservation Area. This includes several late-Victorian terraced and semi-detached houses backing onto Christchurch Park to the west, with more such houses dating from the early twentieth century on eastern side of Westerfield Road.

== Historic landlords ==
The names of some of the historic landlords are on record:

- 1733: Francis Brett
- 1813, 1823: M. Cundy
- 1830, 1839: Samuel Taylor
- 1979: Peter Lockwood
