= Richard Cobbold =

British writer (1797–1877)

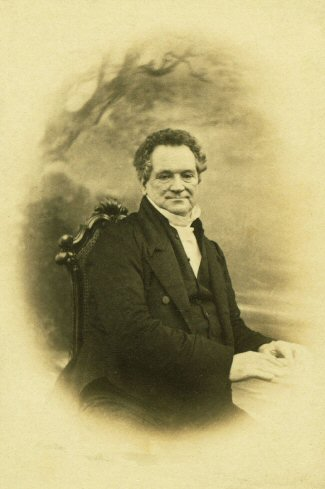
- Born: 1797; Ipswich
- Died: 5 January 1877
- Education: Caius College, Cambridge
- Writing career
- Language: English
- Period: 1827-1858
- Genre: Novels

Richard Cobbold (1797 – 5 January 1877) was a British writer and Church of England clergyman.

== Life ==
Richard Cobbold was born in 1797 in the Suffolk town of Ipswich, to John (1746–1835) and the poet and writer Elizabeth (née Knipe) Cobbold (1764–1824). The Cobbolds were a large and affluent family who made their money from the brewing industry.

Educated at Caius College, Cambridge, Cobbold entered the church, starting at St Mary-le-Tower in Ipswich before moving to Wortham in 1825 with his wife and three sons. He remained there until his death on 5 January 1877.

Cobbold is best known as the author of the History of Margaret Catchpole, a novel based on the romantic adventures of a woman living in the neighbourhood of Ipswich, in whom Cobbold's father had taken a kindly interest. For the copyright of this book he is said to have received £1,000. However Cobbold did not make much money by his other literary ventures, which were mostly undertaken for charitable purposes. Thus his account of Mary Ann Wellington brought in no less than £600, much of it in small gifts, for the subject of the book, who was afterwards placed in an almshouse by Cobbold's exertions.

== Family ==
In 1822, he married the only daughter of Jeptha Waller, by whom he had three sons. One of the sons, Edward Augustus (born 1825), became vicar of the neighbouring parish of Yaxley, and another, Thomas Spencer (born 1828), was a leading parasitologist.

== Obvservations of village life ==
During his time at Wortham, Cobbold recorded the daily lives of his parishioners in words and pictures. The resulting four volumes of notes and watercolours are now housed in the Suffolk Archives, and have become an invaluable source of information about everyday life in the countryside at that time. Selections from this material have been published in book form as The Biography of a Victorian Village: Richard Cobbold's Account of Wortham, Suffolk, 1860 (1977) edited by Ronald Fletcher, and as Cobbold's Wortham: The Portrait of a Victorian Village (2019) edited by Sue Heaser.

== Publications ==
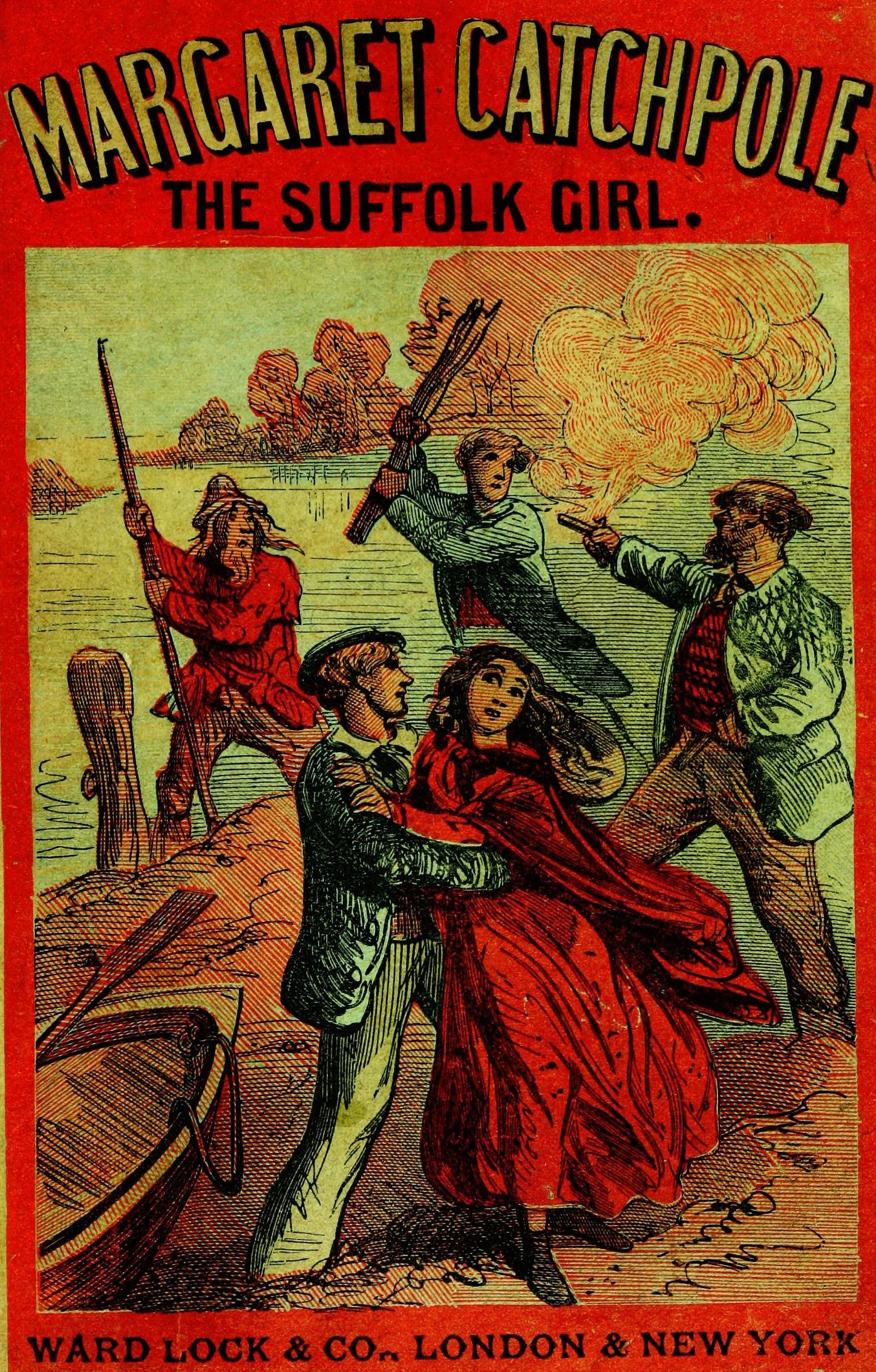
1890 Yellowback cover of Margaret Catchpole: The Suffolk Girl

Cobbold achieved considerable success with his popular historical novels, which include:

- The History of Margaret Catchpole: A Suffolk Girl (1845)
- Mary Anne Wellington: The Soldier's Daughter, Wife, and Widow (1846)
- Zenon the Martyr: A Record of the Piety, Patience and Persecution of the Early Christian Nobles (1847)
- The Young Man's Home, or The Penitent Returned (1848)
- Freston Tower: A Tale of the Times of Cardinal Wolsey (1850)

Other works include:

- Valentine Verses, or Lines of Truth, Love, and Virtue (1827) — poetry
- The Character of Woman (1848) — lecture
- John H. Stegall: A Real History of a Suffolk Man (1857) — an autobiography "edited" (probably ghostwritten) by Cobbold
- Geoffery Gambado, or A Simple Remedy for Hypochondriacism and Melancholy Splenetic Humours (1865) — attributed to Cobbold

== Adaptations ==
- The History of Margaret Catchpole: A Suffolk Girl became the 1887 play An English Lass by Alfred Dampier and C.H. Krieger, which formed the basis for the film The Romantic Story of Margaret Catchpole (1911).
