= Anthony Scoloker =

Anthony Scoloker (died 1593) was a translator and printer who established the first printshop in Ipswich, Suffolk. He was invited to the town by Richard Argentine, with whom he worked on three Protestant tracts. He produced six books with an Ipswich imprint before returning to London.

== Anthony Scoloker fl 1604 ==
For some time Anthony Scoloker was identified as "An. Sc.", the author of Daiphantus, or the Passions of Love a burlesque of contemporary lovesick young men as depicted in the play and love poetry of the time. Francis Douce put this forward in 1807, but other scholars have questioned this, arguing that as there are two mentions of Hamlet by William Shakespeare, but as Scoloker died in 1593 before Hamlet was written sometime between 1599 and 1601, there is little support for this view nowadays. Nevertheless, this attribution to "Anthony Scoloker" attribution as author is maintained by OCLC's WorldCat website. Albert Pollard in his entry for this Anthony Scoloker suggests that there was a second "Anthony Scoloker" – "doubtless a relative" of the printer considered here.
