= Ralph Cobbold =

British Army officer and writer

Lieutenant-Colonel Ralph Patteson Cobbold, later Ralph Patteson Sawle, DSO (10 February 1869 – 5 December 1965) was a British soldier and writer, who served in the 60th Rifles in India.

== Career ==
Ralph Cobbold was born in Ipswich, the second son of the Ipswich MP John Patteson Cobbold. He was commissioned a second lieutenant in the King's Royal Rifle Corps on 17 October 1888, and promoted to lieutenant on 1 October 1890. He explored the Pamirs in 1897–1898. His report on Russian plans to occupy Chitral was an important episode in the Great Game between the Russian and British empires. In his 1900 book about his travels through the Pamirs, Cobbold wrote " “My original object in visiting the Pamir region of Central Asia was that of a sportsman, and I had no idea of either troubling myself with inquiries into the social and political conditions of the people", but in actuality Cobbold was an agent in the British government and was ordered to travel through the Pamirs.

He was appointed to the reserve in March 1899, but re-enlisted to serve in the Second Boer War which started later the same year. Leaving for South Africa in February 1900, he was appointed a Deputy Assistant Adjutant General in South Africa on 19 July 1900. He later took part in British military operations in Somaliland, and in 1902 received the Second class of the Order of the Star of Ethiopia in recognition of services while attached to the Abyssinian Force which cooperated with the British Force. He was received in audience by King Edward VII in January 1903, as the King wanted to know more about Ethiopia and these operations, then returned to Ethiopia for further service, with the local rank of major whilst so employed.

== Family ==
Cobbold's first marriage was to Minnie Diana Pitt, with whom he had a son, Ralph Hamilton Cobbold. In 1929, he married Joan Rosemary Graves-Sawle, daughter of Rear-Admiral Sir Charles John Graves-Sawle and, in 1932, he changed his name to Ralph Patteson Sawle by royal licence.

== Works ==
- Innermost Asia – Travels and Sport in the Pamirs, 1900
