= Thomas Cobbold (1708–1767) =

English brewer of the Georgian era in Harwich and Ipswich

Thomas Cobbold (1708 – 21 April 1767) was an English brewer in Harwich and Ipswich; he succeeded to the family brewing business founded by his father, also Thomas Cobbold.

== Family ==
Thomas married Sarah Cobboll in 1738. Several of their children died in infancy, but others lived into adulthood: Thomas Cobbold (1742–1831), Sarah Cobbold (1744–1839), John Cobbold (1746–1835), William Cobbold (1747–1795) and Mary Cobbold (1750–1832).

== Business career ==
In 1754 Thomas opened the Brewer's Baths, a seawater bathing establishment in Harwich. This was in competition with a similar establishment opened by Thomas Hallstead in 1753. However, by 1760 Thomas had bought out his rival and also bought the Three Cups, a public house also owned by Hallstead. In 1762 Thomas leased a quay and an additional pub, the Angel and Bell, from the Corporation of Harwich. He indicated in the lease that he lived in the parish of St. Nicholas, Harwich. Thomas junior was responsible for shifting the Cobbold brewing business to Ipswich. He established the first Cliff Brewery and lived in Cliff House located beside it.

When he died in 1767 he was buried in St Clement's Church, Ipswich, which has a memorial to him.
