= John Cobbold (businessman) =

English businessman

John Cavendish Cobbold (30 June 1927 – 13 September 1983) nicknamed "Johnny," was an English businessman and a grandson of Victor Cavendish, 9th Duke of Devonshire. He chaired Ipswich Town F.C. from 1957 to 1976.

== Early life ==
Cobbold and his brother Patrick (1934–1994) both went to Wellesley House and on to Eton College. Johnny was just 17 and Patrick 10 when their father was killed in 1944. Johnny saw service in Palestine with the Welsh Guards and Patrick did National Service and signed on for an extra 2 years with his father’s Scots Guards. He was accidentally shot in the leg by one of his soldiers during training but went on to be Aide-de-camp to the Governor of The Bahamas. By the time Johnny celebrated his 21st birthday in 1948 he had become a director of Ipswich Town Football Club and was the youngest director in the football league. He unsuccessfully fought 3 elections as a Conservative candidate.

== Career ==
The brothers were both involved in the Tolly Cobbold brewery in Ipswich and Chairmen of Ipswich Town F.C.

In 1955 Alf Ramsey was appointed manager at Ipswich in succession to Scott Duncan and he took the club from 3rd division (S) to 1st division champions in 1961/62 before being appointed to manage the England side in 1963. His statue was unveiled at Portman Road in August 2000 following his death the previous year. 1957 saw Johnny become Chairman of the club and Chairman of the Brewery which successfully merged with Tolly that year. Bobby Robson came to manage Ipswich in 1969 and his hard and loyal work was rewarded with the FA Cup win in 1978 (one hundred years after the founding of the amateur club) followed by the UEFA Cup in 1981 and 2 Youth Club wins. Bobby Robson loved Ipswich and after a bumpy start Ipswich loved Bobby. The only thing that could have prised him away happened, and for the second time the club lost its manager to the England job.

Johnny had developed cancer and stood down as Chairman in 1976 in favour of Patrick. Their mother Lady Blanche (daughter of Victor Cavendish, 9th Duke of Devonshire and sister-in-law of Harold Macmillan, British Prime Minister), ever supportive, was the Club President. Johnny died in 1983, the Tolly Cobbold brewery having been sold in 1977 to Ellerman Lines for amalgamation with J W Cameron of Hartlepool. Patrick and other family members stayed at their posts but Ellerman shipping losses proved too strong and the business was acquired by the Barclay brothers who sold it on to Brent Walker.

"To describe him as eccentric is only half the story. He was incredibly generous... was at home in any company... [and] I am in no doubt that he was by far the nicest person I ever met."

— Former Ipswich Town captain Allan Hunter describes Cobbold in the foreword to Mel Henderson's book on Cobbold.

Patrick and Timothy Tollemache, 5th Baron Tollemache departed, bringing to an end the family’s involvement. Since 1723 Cobbolds had been Brewers in Suffolk for 266 years. In the 76 years since ITFC went professional there have only been 29 directors but a third of them have been Cobbolds. There have only been 8 Chairmen and 5 of those have been Cobbolds. As of 2007, the family continue to live at Glemham Hall in Suffolk.
