= St Clement's Church, Ipswich =

Church in Ipswich

Coordinates: 52.0539°N 1.1618°E

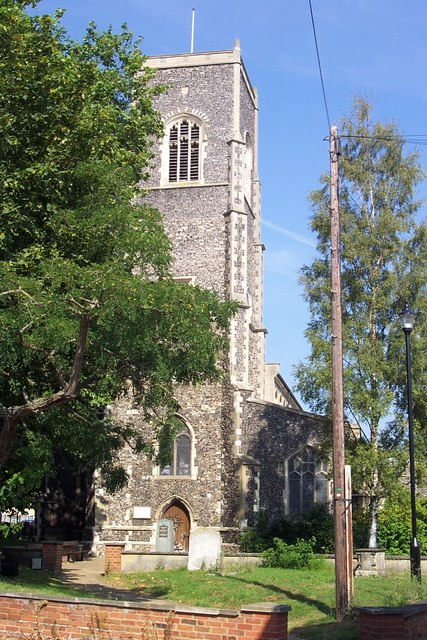
St Clement's Church from the west

St Clement's Church, Ipswich, is a redundant church. The church is one of twelve medieval churches in Ipswich, six of which had been declared redundant by the 1970s. In the twenty-first century it was taken over by Ipswich Historic Churches Trust.

The oldest parts of the church are fourteenth century, with additions from the fifteenth century, with substantial additions in the Tudor period to the tower and to the chancel in 1860 under the guidance of Frederick Barnes.

For 500 years its congregation consisted primarily of the families of shipwrights, sailors, stevedores and merchants. Indeed, wool merchants funded the sixteenth century building of the tower.

== Notable people linked to St Clement's ==
- Thomas Eldred (1561–1624), an English merchant and mariner
- Thomas Cobbold (1708–1767), an English brewer
- Thomas Slade, an English naval architect buried in the churchyard, 1771
