= Thomas Cobbold (diplomat) =

British diplomat and politician

Thomas Clement Cobbold CB (22 July 1833 – 21 November 1883) was a British diplomat and Conservative Party politician.

A member of the Cobbold brewery family, he was the son of John Cobbold, Member of Parliament (MP) for Ipswich, and his wife Lucy, daughter of Reverend Henry Patteson. His elder brother John Cobbold was also Member of Parliament for Ipswich while his younger brother Nathaniel was the grandfather of Cameron Cobbold, 1st Baron Cobbold. Cobbold was educated at Charterhouse. He joined the Diplomatic Service and served as Chargé d'Affaires in Baden-Baden, Rio de Janeiro and Lisbon. In 1876 he succeeded his elder brother John as Member of Parliament for Ipswich, a seat he held until his death. Between 1878 and 1883 he was also the first President of Ipswich Town Football Club.

Cobbold died in November 1883, aged 50.

== See also ==
- Baron Cobbold

== Notes ==
Parliament of the United Kingdom
Preceded by John Patteson Cobbold; James Redfoord Bulwer	Member of Parliament for Ipswich; 1876–1883; With: James Redfoord Bulwer 1876–1880; Jesse Collings 1880–1883	Succeeded by Jesse Collings; Henry Wyndham West
