= John Cobbold (1831–1875) =

British politician

John Patteson Cobbold (12 July 1831 – 10 December 1875) was a Conservative Party politician in England.

The scion of a long-established prominent family in Ipswich, Suffolk, Cobbold was elected at the general election in February 1874 as one of the two Members of Parliament (MPs) for the borough of Ipswich, winning a seat held from 1847 to 1868 by his father John Cobbold (1797–1882). However, the younger Cobbold did not repeat his father's long service, dying office in December 1875, aged 44. At the resulting by-election, his younger brother Thomas Cobbold held the seat for the Conservatives.

His son, John Dupuis Cobbold, was an artist and the husband of Zainab Cobbold, a Scottish convert to Islam.

Parliament of the United Kingdom
Preceded by Henry Wyndham West; Hugh Adair	Member of Parliament for Ipswich; 1874 – 1875; With: James Redfoord Bulwer	Succeeded by Thomas Cobbold; James Redfoord Bulwer
