= Edgar Sterling Cobbold =

British geologist

Dr Edgar Sterling Cobbold
- Died: 20 November 1936
- Education: Owens College
- Known for: Studies of Cambrian geology
- Awards: Murchison Fund (1911); Murchison Medal (1921); Honorary DSc, University of Manchester (1930)

Edgar Sterling Cobbold D.Sc. (died 20 November 1936) was a British amateur geologist, who was an authority on Cambrian fossils. He was awarded the Murchison Medal of the Geological Society of London in 1921, and an honorary DSc by the Victoria University of Manchester in 1930.

== Life and works ==
Cobbold was the son of a surgeon, Rowland Townshend Cobbold. He studied engineering at Owens college, and practised as a civil engineer. In 1886, he retired to Church Stretton, and devoted the rest of his life to the study of natural history. Cobbold's detailed work on Cambrian rocks in the areas around Stretton and Wrekin led to the discovery of hundreds of new species of fossils, and allowed Cobbold to sub-divide the Cambrian succession into many fine time-divisions. This work led this area of geology to become recognised as the ‘type-section’ for the Cambrian. In recognition of his work, Cobbold was awarded the Murchison Fund of the Geological Society of London in 1911, and the Murchison Medal in 1921. In 1930, Cobbold was awarded an Honorary Doctor of Science degree by the University of Manchester, as a part of the celebrations of the eighieth anniversary of the foundation of Owens College, and the fiftieth anniversary of the Victoria University of Manchester.

A subfamily of trilobites, Cobboldites are named after Cobbold, who first described them in 1910.

== Selected publications ==
- Cobbold, E. S. 1892. The Silurian Outlier West of Caer Caradoc. Midland Naturalist, 15, 217–21.
- Cobbold, E. S. 1910. On some small trilobites from the Cambrian rocks of Comley (Shropshire). Quarterly Journal of the Geological Society of London, 46, 19–51.
- Cobbold, E. S. 1921. The Cambrian Horizons of Comley (Shropshire) and their Brachiopoda, Pteropoda, Gasteropoda etc. Quart. J. Geol. Soc., 76, for 1920, 325–86.
- Cobbold, E. S. 1927. The Stratigraphy and Geological Structure of the Cambrian Area of Comley (Shropshire). Quart. J. Geol. Soc., 83, 551–73.
- Cobbold, E.S. and Pocock, R.W. 1934, The Cambrian area of Rushton (Shropshire), Phil Trans Roy Soc B223, 304 to 409.
