= Thomas Spencer Cobbold =

19th-century English biologist

T. Spencer Cobbold
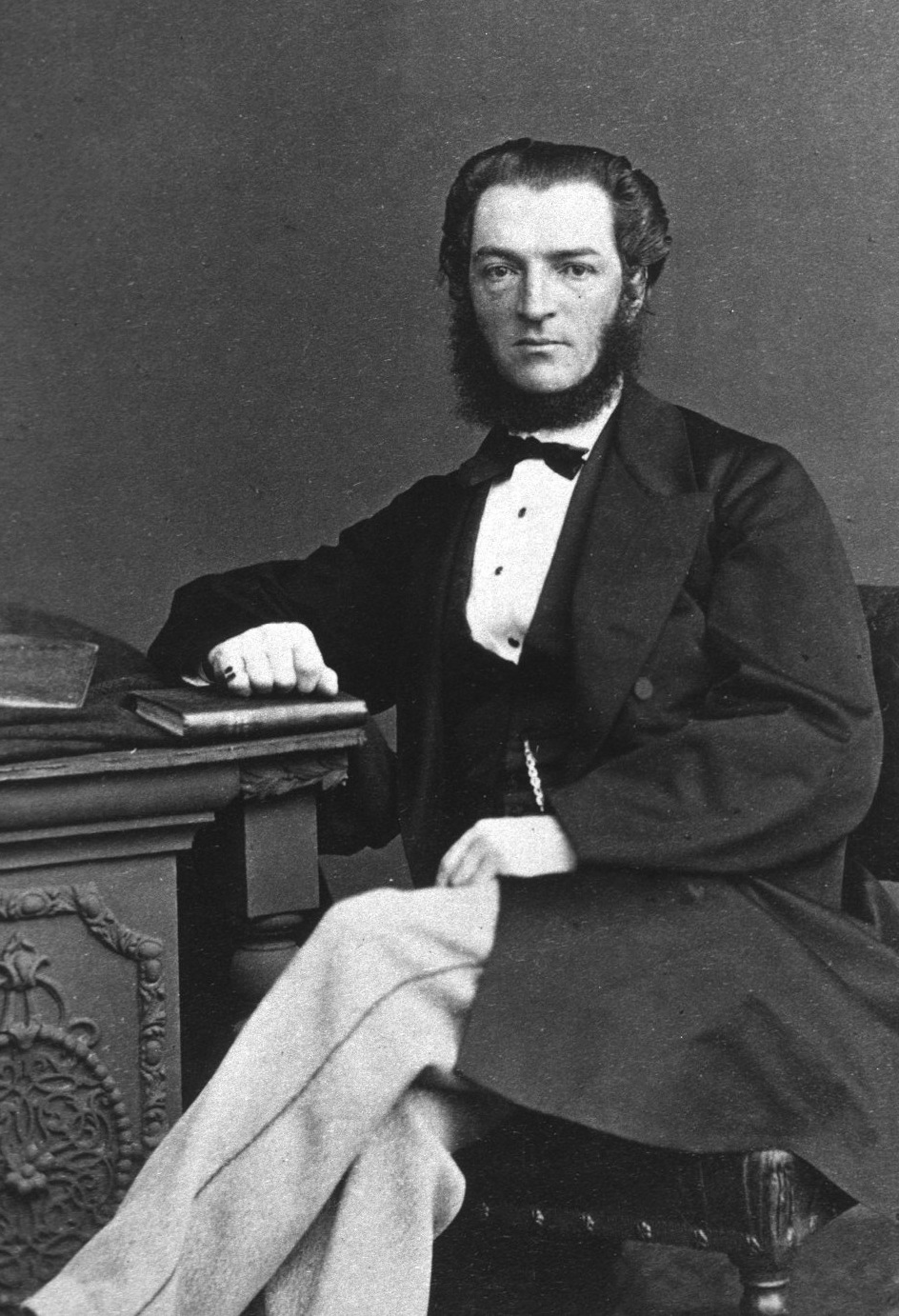
- Born: 26 May 1828; Ipswich
- Died: 20 March 1886 (aged 57); London
- Education: University of Edinburgh
- Awards: Fellow of the Royal Society
- Scientific career
- Fields: Zoology; anatomy
- Workplaces: St Mary's Hospital, London; Middlesex Hospital; British Museum; Royal Veterinary College
- Author abbrev. (zoology): Cobbold

Thomas Spencer Cobbold FRS (26 May 1828 – 10 March 1886) was an English biologist.

== Life ==
He was born at Ipswich, the third son of Rev. Richard Cobbold, author of the History of Margaret Catchpole.

After graduating in medicine at the University of Edinburgh in 1851, he was appointed lecturer on botany at St Mary's Hospital, London in 1857, and also on zoology and comparative anatomy at Middlesex Hospital in 1861. He was elected a Fellow of the Royal Society in June, 1864.

From 1868 he acted as Swiney Lecturer on geology at the British Museum until 1873, when he became professor of botany at the Royal Veterinary College, afterwards filling a chair of helminthology which was specially created for him at that institution. He was president of the Quekett Microscopical Club from 1879-80. He died in London on 20 March 1886.

His special subject was helminthology, particularly the worms parasitic in man and animals, and as a physician he gained a considerable reputation in the diagnosis of cases depending on the presence of such organisms.

== Works ==
His numerous writings include:

- 'Entozoa; an introduction to the study of Helminthology, with reference more particularly to the internal parasites of man,' 1864.
- 'Entozoa,' a supplement to the last work, 1869.
- 'The Grouse Disease,' 1873.
- 'The Internal Parasites of our Domesticated Animals,' 1873.
- ' Parasites,' 1879.
- 'Tapeworms,' 1866; fourth edition, 1883.
- 'Worms,' 1872.
- 'Human Parasites,' 1882.
- 'Parasites of Meat and Prepared Flesh Food,' 1884.
- 'Our Food-producing Ruminants and the Parasites which reside in them,' Cantor Lectures, 1871.
- 'Catalogue of the Specimens of Entozoa in the Museum of the Royal College of Surgeons of England,' 1866.
