= Ipswich Journal =

Defunct newspaper in Ipswich, Suffolk

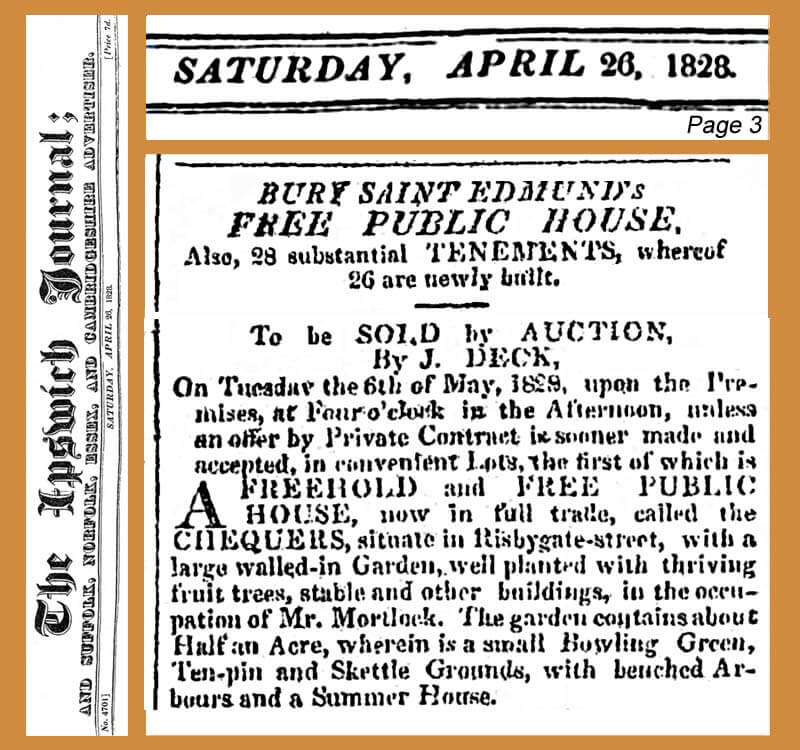
An auction notice from 1828.

The Ipswich Journal was a newspaper founded in Ipswich, Suffolk in August 1720. Far from being a local newspaper, the Ipswich Journal featured national and international news. At a cost of “three half-pence” it attracted a small but affluent readership of about 250 gentlemen. It was published on a weekly basis until 29 June, 1886.

The newspaper was founded by John Bagnall, who had moved to Ipswich from London. In 1739 it was taken over by William Craighton, who continued publication until his death in 1761. At this point the newspaper continued under the ownership of his unmarried sister Elizabeth and their nephew, William Jackson. The final edition appeared on 26 July 1902.
