= John Cobbold (1746–1835) =

English brewer and businessman (1746–1835)

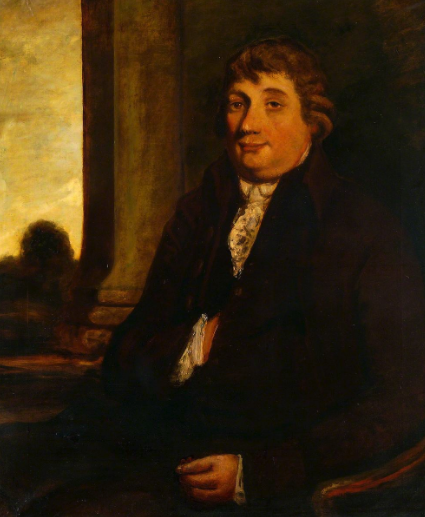
Portrait of John Cobbold by George Frost

John Cobbold (1746–1835) was an English businessman in Ipswich. At the age of 22 he started running Cliff Brewery, part of the family brewing business established by his grandfather, Thomas Cobbold. More than thirty men of the Cobbold family have been named John, but he was known as "Big John". He greatly expanded the family business and had 22 children.

His father Thomas Cobbold left money to his sons and daughters, in trust to his wife, Sarah Cobbold. She leased the family brewery in Harwich to John and his partner Charles Cox.

In 1773 he married Elizabeth Wilkinson, with whom he had 15 children before her death in 1790. They moved into the Manor House, St Margaret's Green, located by St Margaret's Church, Ipswich.

In 1791 he married Elizabeth Knipe in St Clement's Church, Ipswich, with whom he had another 7 children.
