= Cliff Brewery =

Brewery building in Ipswich, England

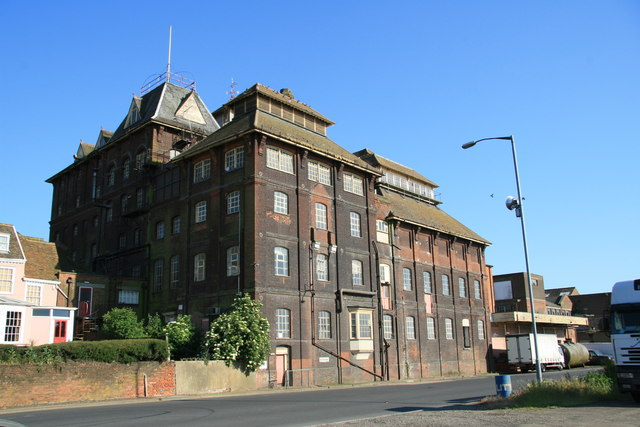
- Cliff Brewery, Ipswich
- Interactive map of the Cliff Brewery area

General information
- Type: Brewery
- Location: Ipswich, Suffolk
- Coordinates: 52.044522°N 1.163828°E
- Construction started: 1746

Design and construction
- Designations: Grade II

The Cliff Brewery is a Grade II listed former brewery in Ipswich, England. The building dates to 1896 and was designed by William Bradford.

== Location ==
The building is located on Cliff Lane, near the Ipswich wet dock.

== History ==
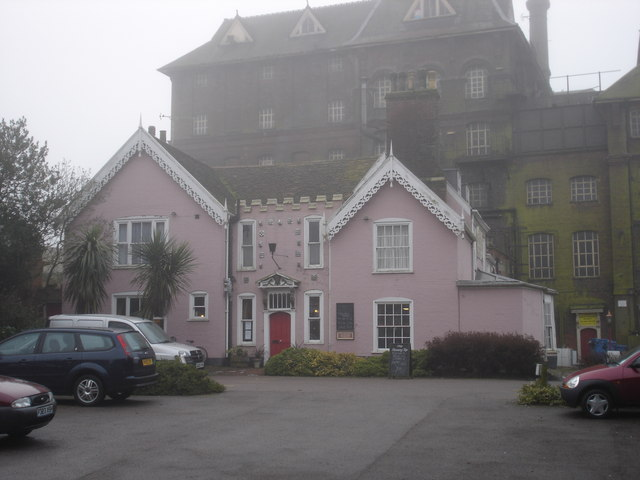
Cliff House, later the Brewery Tap pub

The business that became Cliff Brewery was started in 1723 (in Kings Quay Street, Harwich) by Thomas Cobbold and is believed to be the second oldest independent brewery in England. Thomas senior started to transport fresh water from Holywells by barge to Harwich as the spring water was better than the brackish water available in Harwich. His son Thomas Cobbold (1708–1767) then relocated the brewery to Ipswich where the original building stood above the quays of the River Orwell since 1746. The current building of 1896 is a tower brewery by William Bradford. It became a Grade II listed building in 1989; the listing includes the interior fixtures and fittings.

Nearby Cliff House was the home of John Cobbold and Elizabeth Cobbold before they moved to live at Holywells Park, Ipswich in 1814. It became the Brewery Tap public house.

Cobbold merged with local rival, Tollemache Breweries in 1957 to form Tolly Cobbold. The brewery ceased operations in 2002, when the Tolly Cobbold company merged with Ridley's brewery.

After it became disused, schemes were put forward to convert the Cliff Brewery into housing and a mixed-use development. Planning permission was granted in 2016 for a business and educational centre, but the owner sold it in May 2019 without having begun work. Conversion into housing and a theatre was later considered. The Victorian Society listed the building in 2015 as one of the most endangered in England.

In February 2020 a fire broke out in the building; arrests were made on suspicion of arson.

== Plans for redevelopment ==
Prior plans from 2020 proposed a renovation and expansion including a visitor and education centre with theatre and arts spaces linked to the local university, but these fell through due to a lack of funds. The Cliff Brewery was sold at auction through estate agents Savills in November 2021. In spring 2022 the new owner of the site submitted pre-application proposals to the borough for redevelopment of the site.
