= Elizabeth Cobbold =

English writer and poet ((1767–1824)

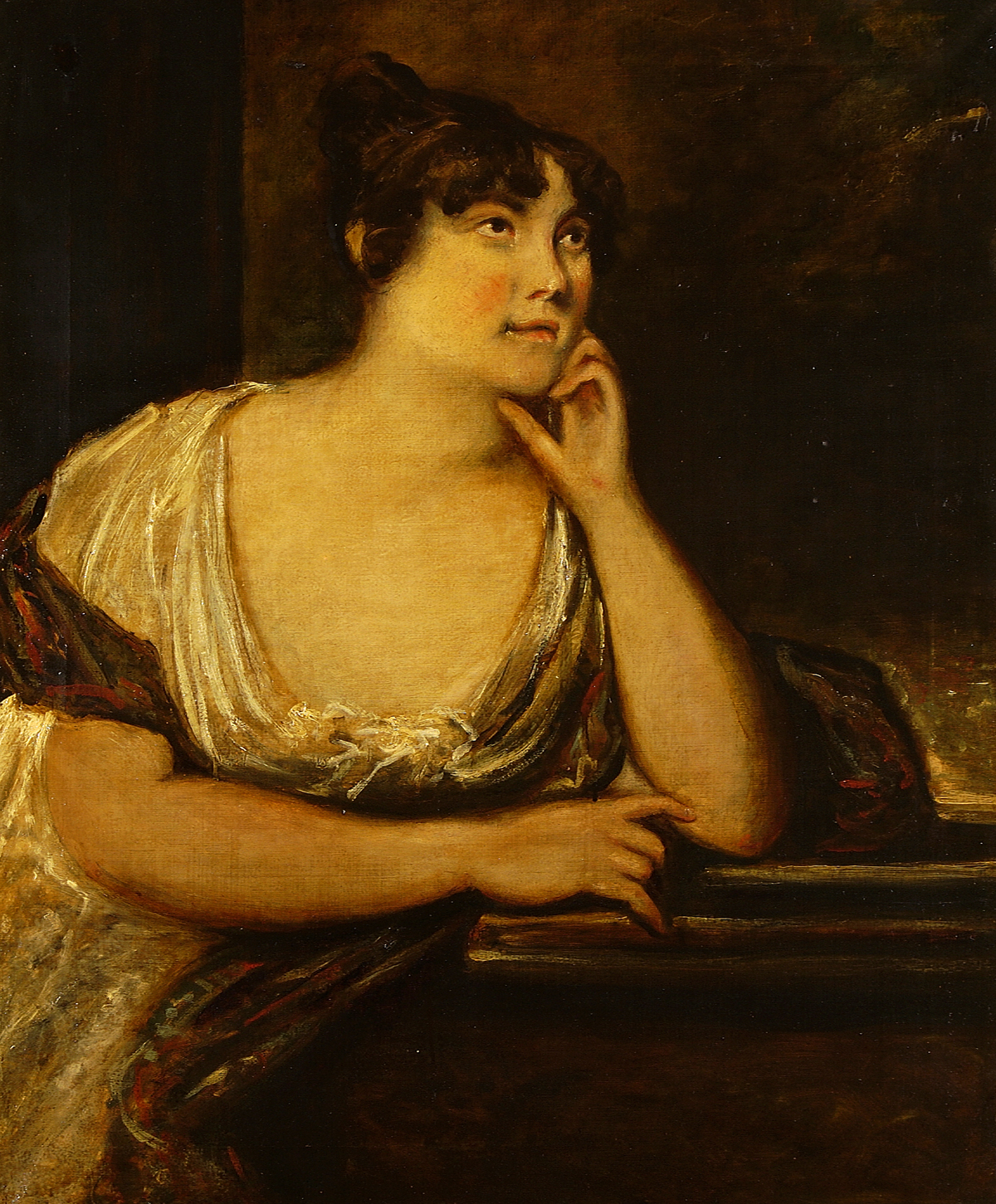
- Portrait attributed to George Frost
- Born: Elizabeth Knipe; 1767; London, England
- Died: 1824 (aged 56–57)
- Occupations: Writer and poet

Elizabeth Cobbold or Carolina Petty Pasty born Elizabeth Knipe (1767 – 17 October, 1824) was an English writer and poet.

== Life ==
Cobbold was born Elizabeth Knipe in Watling Street, London in 1767 to Robert Knipe. Her mother's maiden name was Waller. She was baptised in the now lost church of St Olave Silver Street.

In November 1790, she married William Clarke a portman of Ipswich who worked for the customs. William was older than her and disabled and he died after less than a year. By this time, she had published her first novel The Sword, or Father Bertrand's History of his own Times, which was influenced by her friend Clara Reeve. The following year after becoming a widow, she married the Ipswich brewer John Cobbold, and she became the stepmother of fifteen children as well as, in time, giving birth to an additional seven. In 1814 they moved to a house at Holywells Park in Ipswich from their previous house, The Cliff.

Despite this number of children, she published under the pseudonym of Carolina Petty Pasty a poetical piece that included a portrait, which was her work too. In 1803, she served as editor of a volume of poems by Ann Candler. Cobbold continued to do charitable work and in 1812 she started a clothing society for small children and in 1820 a charitable bazaar.

From 1806, Cobbold was known for Valentine's Day cards that had verses written by herself and she published these in 1813 and 1814. The verses were attached to cleverly cut paper and it has been said that the skill of the cutting exceeded the quality of the poetry.

There are extant oil paintings of Elizabeth and her husband John that are attributed to George Frost. Her son Richard Cobbold was also a noted writer.

== Elizabeth Cobbold as a geologist ==
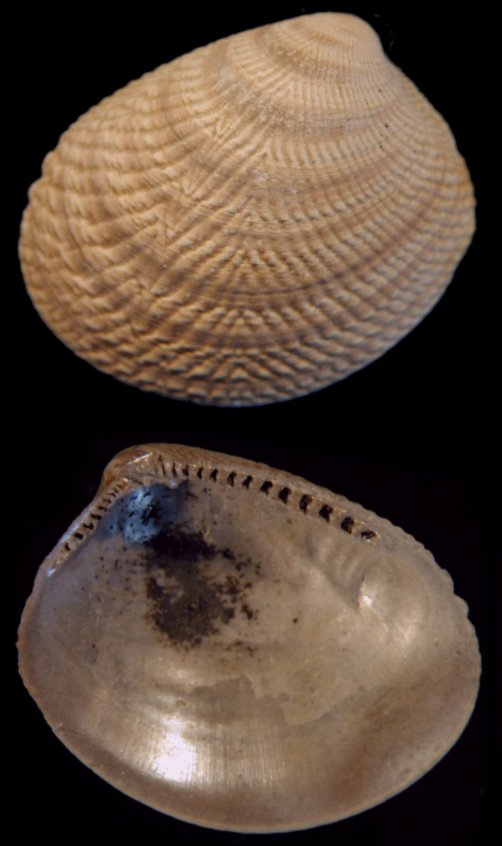
Acila cobboldiae was named for her.

Elizabeth Cobbold was also one of the first geologists. She collected fossils from the Red Crag Formation in the grounds of Holywells park. One of these, Nucula cobboldiae, was named after her by James Sowerby and included in Mineral Conchology of Great Britain. The sample is now located in the Museums Victoria Collections, Australia. The Acila cobboldiae, a rare species of shellfish, was also named after her by George Sowerby.

== Literary works ==
- Poems on Various Subjects. 1783.
- Six Narrative Poems 1787.
- The Sword; or, Father Bertrand's History of His Own Times 1791.
- The Mince Pie, an Heroic Epistle 1800.
- Cliff Valentines. 1813, 1814
- An Ode on the Victory of Waterloo 1815.
- Monody to the Memory of Mrs. Byles 1818.
- Poems, with a Memoir of the Author [ed. Laetitia Jermyn]. 1825.
