= Tolly Cobbold =

Brewery in Ipswich, England

- Industry: Brewing
- Predecessor: Tollemache Breweries, Cobbold Breweries
- Founded: Ipswich, Suffolk, England
- Website: tollycobbold.co.uk

Tolly Cobbold is a former brewery in Suffolk, England.

== History ==
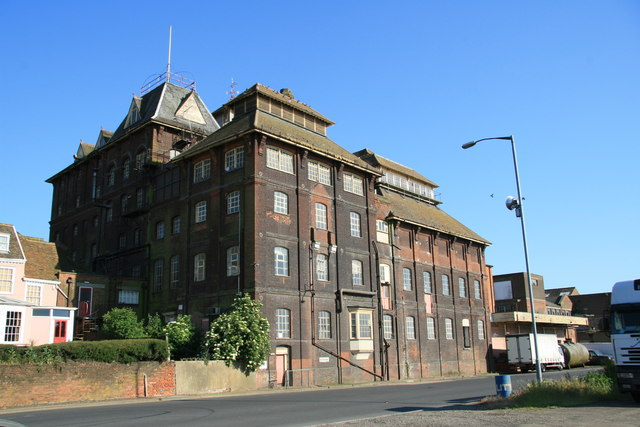
Cliff Brewery, Ipswich

The name Tolly Cobbold is an amalgamation of the two family-run brewers: the Tollemache Brewery owned by the Tollemache family and the Cobbold Brewery owned by the Cobbold family.

The original Cobbold brewery was founded in Harwich, Essex in 1723 and in 1746 the Cobbold Cliff Brewery was founded, at Cliff Lane, Ipswich. The current building of 1896 is a tower brewery by William Bradford.

The Tollemache Brewery was founded in 1888 by three sons of John Tollemache, 1st Baron Tollemache. The family acquired Ipswich Brewery from Cullingham & Co. in 1880, the Essex Brewery at Walthamstow in 1920, a controlling share of the Star Brewery, Cambridge in 1930 and full control in 1947. Tollemache and Cobbold merged in 1958 to form Tolly Cobbold.

Peter Scully, head brewer at Tolly Cobbold until his departure in 1977 remarked that the decline in the number of agricultural workers in the Suffolk villages which both breweries served, meant that the two companies had to merge, and where there were two rival pubs, either the Tolly pub or Cobbold pub was closed.

Tolly Cobbold was taken over by Ellerman Lines in 1977 who sold it to the Barclay brothers in 1983 who then sold it to Brent Walker in 1989. Brent Walker announced they would close the brewery for development as a marina, with production of Tolly Cobbold beers to transfer to Camerons Brewery. Brian Cowie and Bob Wales led a management buy-out of the brewery (but not the pubs) for £4m, supported by the Tollemaches and Cobbolds among others.

The brewery was then acquired by Ridley's Brewery in 2002, who closed the Cliff Brewery. Ridley's Brewery was taken over by Suffolk-based Greene King in 2005.

Ridley's continued to brew just one Tolly Cobbold beer, Tolly Original, in Chelmsford. Greene King have not indicated any plans to continue brewing it, but remained a major sponsor of Ipswich Town F.C., which was established by the Cobbold family in 1878.

== Cobbold family ==
The Cobbolds have an important status in Ipswich as the family were landowners in the town and surrounding area. John Chevalier Cobbold (1797–1882) was descended from "Big" John Cobbold (1746–1835), a 3rd generation brewer. Christchurch Park was donated to "The people of Ipswich" by the family, along with many other donations of land such as Ipswich Racecourse. The family also provided several Members of Parliament for Ipswich over the years. In addition they have provided five chairmen of Ipswich Town Football Club. Lady Blanche Cobbold was president of the club for many years. ITFC have named a stand in their stadium and a prestigious member's club after the Cobbold family.

== Tolly Cobbold beers ==
Beers in the range included Tolly Original, Cobnut, Tolly Bitter, Tolly Mild, Old Strong, Old Strong Porter (bottle only). Tollyshooter (named in honour of the visit of Sir John Harvey-Jones to the brewery for his television programme Troubleshooter, shortly after the 1990 management takeover) Cantab, Cardinal Ale, Cobbold's Conquest, Cobbold's IPA (a straw-coloured bitter), Beano Stout, Countdown, Election Ale (1997), Suffolk Ale, Final Brew and Last Orders – a final brew in 2002.

For a short time in the 1960s, Tolly Cobbold produced an infamous lager known as Husky Brew, which John Cobbold himself compared to a dog's urine.
