= Lady Evelyn Cobbold =

British Muslim aristocrat

- Born: Lady Evelyn Murray; 17 July 1867; Edinburgh, Scotland
- Died: 25 January 1963 (aged 95); Inverness, Scotland
- Known for: First Muslim woman born in Britain to perform the Hajj pilgrimage
- Spouse: John Dupuis Cobbold (m. 1891–1922)
- Children: 3
- Parent(s): Charles Murray, 7th Earl of Dunmore; Lady Gertrude Coke

Lady Evelyn Cobbold (née Murray; 17 July 1867 – 25 January 1963), also known as Zainab Cobbold, was a Scottish diarist, traveller and noblewoman who was known for her conversion to Islam in 1915.

== Biography ==
Born in Edinburgh in 1867, she was the eldest daughter of Charles Adolphus Murray, 7th Earl of Dunmore and Lady Gertrude Coke, daughter of the Second Earl of Leicester. She married John Dupuis Cobbold in All Saints' Church Cairo, Egypt on 23 April 1891. Following a party in May 1891, at the Cobbold family home Holywells, Ipswich, they settled there. Here the couple had three children between 1893 and 1900: Winifred Evelyn (1892–1965), Ivan Cobbold (1897–1944), and Pamela Cobbold (1900–1932). However, in 1922 she separated from her husband. Subsequently she lived in London and on the Glencarron Estate.

=== Childhood ===
Cobbold spent much of her childhood in Algiers and Cairo in the company of Muslim nannies. She considered herself a Muslim from a young age despite not officially professing her faith until she met the Pope. She became a Mayfair socialite. She spent her childhood winters in North Africa where her fascination with Islam developed.

=== Conversion to Islam ===
Lady Evelyn embarked on a journey through the Libyan Desert in 1911 with her American friend, Frances Gordon Alexander. They published a joint account of the journey Wayfarers in the Libyan Desert in 1912. This led her to develop a greater interest in Islam. She confirmed her conversion to Islam by 1915, taking the Arabic name Zainab. She remarked that she considered Islam the religion "most calculated to solve the world's many perplexing problems, and to bring to humanity peace and happiness".

== Pilgrimage to Mecca ==
Following the death of her former husband in 1929, Lady Evelyn started to plan her pilgrimage, or Hajj, to Mecca. She contacted Hafiz Wahba, ambassador for the Kingdom of Hejaz and Nejd to the United Kingdom, who in turn sent a letter to King ‘Abd al-‘Aziz.

Evelyn achieved celebrity status in 1933 at the age of 65, when she became the first Muslim woman born in the United Kingdom to perform the pilgrimage to Mecca. In 1934, a personal account of her trip was published with the title Pilgrimage to Mecca. There is an excerpt from her work in Michael Wolfe's book One Thousand Roads to Mecca.

She visited Italy with a friend and went to see the Pope who asked her if she was Catholic. Although she had never thought about Islam for years she replied by saying she was Muslim. After that she decided to read up more about Islam and eventually converted.

In 1933, she travelled to perform the Hajj for the first time, and because there were Europeans who visited Saudi Arabia before her and who were not Muslim penetrated into Mecca and when returning to Europe, they wrote about their daring adventure of performing the Hajj as a non-Muslim. Because of this there were restrictions in place for Europeans, but Lady Evelyn, who adopted the name Zainab, was granted permission to perform the Hajj.

=== Diary ===
This is her description in her diary of the first time she saw the Kabah and tawaf:

"We walk on the smooth marble towards the Holy of Holies, the House of Allah, the great black cube rising in simple majesty, the goal for which millions have forfeited their lives and yet more millions have found heaven in beholding it … the 'Tawaf' is a symbol, to use the words of the poet, of a lover making a circuit round the house of his beloved, completely surrendering himself and sacrificing all his interests for the sake of the Beloved. It is in that spirit of self-surrender that the pilgrim makes the 'Tawaf'".

Her book Pilgrimage to Mecca in 1934 is the first Hajj account by a Scottish Woman and her diary also is the oldest record of a trip during the Hajj, when she went by car from Mina to Arafat. She travelled widely all her life and also wrote another book, Kenya: Land of Illusion.

She spoke and wrote Arabic fluently.

=== Writing ===
"Islam," Evelyn later wrote, "is the religion of common sense." Lady Evelyn's story about her life, her conversion and her pilgrimage to Mecca are all recorded in her diaries which have recently been republished.

"She was a very lively, eccentric Anglo-Scot Moslem, who loved doing things and loved people as well," Major Philip Hope-Cobbold, her great-grandson said about her.

=== Death ===
Lady Evelyn died in 1963 in Inverness and was buried, as she stipulated, on a remote hillside on her Glencarron estate in Wester Ross. There was no Muslim in Scotland to perform her janazah so they contacted Shah Jahan Mosque, Woking and the Imam drove up in the snow to perform her janazah. She had stipulated she wanted to be buried on a hill on her estate facing Mecca with the following words on her gravestone: Allahu nur-us-samawati wal ard ("Allah is the light of the heavens and the earth").

In 2022 her grave was visited by a party of pilgrims from the Convert Islam Foundation, a British organisation for converts to Islam, who walked the 20-kilometre (12 mi) round trip up Gleann Fhiodhaig from Glen Carron. The 2019 novel Bird Summons by Leila Aboulela (W&N, ISBN 978-1474600125) describes a pilgrimage by three Muslim women in search of Cobbold's grave.
