= Thomas Cobbold (1680–1752) =

Stuart/Georgian-era English brewer from East Anglia

Thomas Cobbold (April 1680 – 1752) was an English brewer who established a brewery in Ipswich. The Cobbold family went on to become one of the most influential families in Ipswich.

Cobbold was born in Rattlesden, the son of John Cobbold (1654–1736) and Mary Parker (1650–1693). He set up as a maltster in Bury St Edmunds. In 1723 he established a brewery in King's Quay Street, Harwich.

The water in Harwich was found to be brackish; as Cobbold owned land near Holywells near Ipswich, he started shipping water from there to Harwich for use in the brewery.
