= Listed buildings in Ipswich =

Non-Civil Parish in Suffolk, England

Ipswich is town, a non-civil parish and a borough in Suffolk, England. It contains eleven grade I, 29 grade II* and 419 grade II listed buildings that are recorded in the National Heritage List for England.

This list is based on the information retrieved online from Historic England

== Key ==
Grade	Criteria
I	Buildings that are of exceptional interest
II*	Particularly important buildings of more than special interest
II	Buildings that are of special interest

== Listing ==
Name	Grade	Location	Type	Completed (Note: The date given is the date used by Historic England as significant for the initial building or that of an important part in the structure's description.)	Date designated	Grid ref. (Note: The grid reference is based on the British national grid reference system, sometimes known as OSGB36, used by the Ordnance Survey.) Geo-coordinates	Notes	Entry number (Note: The "List Entry Number" is a unique number assigned to each listed building and scheduled monument by Historic England.)	Image	Wikidata
Ipswich and East Suffolk Hospital (entrance Block)	II	Angelsea Road			4 August 1972	TM1604645246; 52°03′48″N 1°09′01″E		1206298	Upload Photo	Q26501538
Walls to Number 65	II	Anglesea Road			4 August 1994	TM1559245327; 52°03′52″N 1°08′38″E		1237502	Upload Photo	Q26530643
12, Anglesea Road	II	12, Anglesea Road			15 December 1977	TM1581645272; 52°03′50″N 1°08′49″E		1236166	Upload Photo	Q26529418
14, Anglesea Road	II	14, Anglesea Road			15 December 1977	TM1579745277; 52°03′50″N 1°08′48″E		1236296	Upload Photo	Q26529536
16-22, Anglesea Road	II	16-22, Anglesea Road			15 December 1977	TM1578345281; 52°03′50″N 1°08′48″E		1264742	Upload Photo	Q26555412
48 and 50, Anglesea Road	II	48 and 50, Anglesea Road			4 August 1994	TM1559745365; 52°03′53″N 1°08′38″E		1237549	Upload Photo	Q26530680
61, Anglesea Road	II	61, Anglesea Road			4 August 1994	TM1563945292; 52°03′50″N 1°08′40″E		1237501	Upload Photo	Q26530642
65, Anglesea Road	II	65, Anglesea Road			4 August 1994	TM1558345310; 52°03′51″N 1°08′37″E		1237592	Upload Photo	Q26530719
121, Anglesea Road	II	121, Anglesea Road			4 August 1994	TM1542545325; 52°03′52″N 1°08′29″E		1237597	Upload Photo	Q26530724
The Arcade	II	1 and 2, Arcade Street			4 August 1972	TM1616444577; 52°03′27″N 1°09′06″E		1037786	Upload Photo	Q26289501
14 and 16, Arcade Street	II	14 and 16, Arcade Street			4 August 1972	TM1609444603; 52°03′28″N 1°09′02″E		1037787	Upload Photo	Q26289502
17, Arcade Street	II	17, Arcade Street			15 December 1977	TM1610144574; 52°03′27″N 1°09′03″E		1264649	Upload Photo	Q26555325
The Former St Clements Congregational Church	II	Back Hamlet, IP3 8AH			8 September 2023	TM1711344140; 52°03′11″N 1°09′55″E		1486564	The Former St Clements Congregational Church More images	Q126202211
78, Back Hamlet	II	78, Back Hamlet			28 September 1999	TM1729844128; 52°03′10″N 1°10′04″E		1113249	Upload Photo	Q26407128
United Reformed Church and Attached Parish Rooms	II	Barrack Corner			6 April 1988	TM1573544837; 52°03′36″N 1°08′44″E		1237380	Upload Photo	Q26530529
2-8, Barrack Lane	II	2-8, Barrack Lane			4 August 1972	TM1577344882; 52°03′37″N 1°08′46″E		1235323	Upload Photo	Q26528659
10, Barrack Lane	II	10, Barrack Lane			4 August 1972	TM1578844879; 52°03′37″N 1°08′47″E		1235207	Upload Photo	Q26528557
Goldrood House	II	Belstead Road			15 December 1977	TM1529343186; 52°02′43″N 1°08′17″E		1236168	Upload Photo	Q26529421
Lodge to St Joseph's College	II	Belstead Road			15 December 1977	TM1512642831; 52°02′32″N 1°08′08″E		1236310	Upload Photo	Q26529547
Lonsdale Cottage	II	Belstead Road			15 December 1977	TM1616043742; 52°03′00″N 1°09′04″E		1236167	Upload Photo	Q26529420
St Joseph's College	II	Belstead Road			15 December 1977	TM1507743039; 52°02′38″N 1°08′06″E		1264743	Upload Photo	Q99937440
Stables to Goldrood House	II	Belstead Road			15 December 1977	TM1533543206; 52°02′43″N 1°08′19″E		1264744	Upload Photo	Q26555413
Wall and Gate Piers to Goldrood House	II	Belstead Road			15 December 1977	TM1525743146; 52°02′42″N 1°08′15″E		1236311	Upload Photo	Q26529548
Round Lodge	II	299, Belstead Road			4 August 1994	TM1489342349; 52°02′16″N 1°07′54″E		1264071	Upload Photo	Q26554807
23-29, Berners Street	II	23-29, Berners Street			15 December 1977	TM1591344919; 52°03′38″N 1°08′54″E		1264640	Upload Photo	Q26555316
31-43, Berners Street	II	31-43, Berners Street			4 August 1972	TM1593144982; 52°03′40″N 1°08′55″E		1280276	Upload Photo	Q26569431
32, Berners Street	II	32, Berners Street			15 December 1977	TM1594344911; 52°03′38″N 1°08′55″E		1236312	Upload Photo	Q26529549
34-46, Berners Street	II	34-46, Berners Street			15 December 1977	TM1595444937; 52°03′39″N 1°08′56″E		1236170	Upload Photo	Q26529422
45 and 47, Berners Street	II	45 and 47, Berners Street			4 August 1972	TM1593744995; 52°03′40″N 1°08′55″E		1037788	Upload Photo	Q26289503
48-52, Berners Street	II	48-52, Berners Street			15 December 1977	TM1597544985; 52°03′40″N 1°08′57″E		1264657	Upload Photo	Q26555333
49, Berners Street	II	49, Berners Street			4 August 1972	TM1594445021; 52°03′41″N 1°08′55″E		1206335	Upload Photo	Q26501572
51-55, Berners Street	II	51-55, Berners Street			15 December 1977	TM1595545042; 52°03′42″N 1°08′56″E		1236322	Upload Photo	Q26529556
54, Berners Street	II	54, Berners Street			15 December 1977	TM1597945004; 52°03′41″N 1°08′57″E		1236319	Upload Photo	Q26529553
Berners House	II	56, Berners Street			15 December 1977	TM1598945018; 52°03′41″N 1°08′58″E		1264658	Upload Photo	Q26555334
57, Berners Street	II	57, Berners Street			4 August 1972	TM1595845049; 52°03′42″N 1°08′56″E		1037747	Upload Photo	Q26289462
58 and 60, Berners Street	II	58 and 60, Berners Street			15 December 1977	TM1599145022; 52°03′41″N 1°08′58″E		1236320	Upload Photo	Q26529554
59-83, Berners Street	II	59-83, Berners Street			15 December 1977	TM1597245087; 52°03′43″N 1°08′57″E		1236372	Upload Photo	Q26529604
62-70, Berners Street	II	62-70, Berners Street			15 December 1977	TM1600545055; 52°03′42″N 1°08′59″E		1236321	Upload Photo	Q26529555
72, Berners Street	II	72, Berners Street			15 December 1977	TM1601345078; 52°03′43″N 1°08′59″E		1264659	Upload Photo	Q26555335
85 and 87, Berners Street	II	85 and 87, Berners Street			15 December 1977	TM1598645129; 52°03′45″N 1°08′58″E		1264660	Upload Photo	Q26555336
89, Berners Street	II	89, Berners Street			15 December 1977	TM1599045144; 52°03′45″N 1°08′58″E		1236374	Upload Photo	Q26529607
90 and 92, Berners Street	II	90 and 92, Berners Street			4 August 1972	TM1602945148; 52°03′45″N 1°09′00″E		1374797	Upload Photo	Q26655637
Boundary Wall, Gatepiers And Gate At Upland Gate (number 39), Facing Bishops Hill	II	39, Bishops Hill			11 May 2000	TM1752743813; 52°03′00″N 1°10′16″E		1380289	Upload Photo	Q26660497
Uplands	II	39, Bishops Hill			11 February 2000	TM1755943831; 52°03′01″N 1°10′17″E		1380085	Upload Photo	Q26660301
17, Blackhorse Lane	II	17, Blackhorse Lane			4 August 1972	TM1602244610; 52°03′28″N 1°08′59″E		1037748	Upload Photo	Q26289463
The Black Horse Inn	II	23, Blackhorse Lane			4 August 1972	TM1603344571; 52°03′27″N 1°08′59″E		1037749	Upload Photo	Q26289464
St Margaret's Church House	II	Bolton Lane			19 December 1951	TM1668444870; 52°03′35″N 1°09′34″E		1037750	Upload Photo	Q26289465
2-6, Bolton Lane	II	2-6, Bolton Lane			4 August 1972	TM1665744822; 52°03′34″N 1°09′32″E		1374798	Upload Photo	Q26655638
40 and 42, Bolton Lane	II	40 and 42, Bolton Lane			4 August 1972	TM1668444932; 52°03′37″N 1°09′34″E		1374799	Upload Photo	Q26655639
44, Bolton Lane	II	44, Bolton Lane			4 August 1972	TM1668644938; 52°03′38″N 1°09′34″E		1037751	Upload Photo	Q26289466
Church of St Thomas	II	Bramford Lane			24 June 2011	TM1455545905; 52°04′12″N 1°07′45″E		1400120	Upload Photo	Q26675403
Suffolk Record Office and Theatre	II	Bramford Road			4 August 1994	TM1514245155; 52°03′47″N 1°08′14″E		1237503	Upload Photo	Q26530644
Burlington Baptist Church Hall	II	Burlington Road			4 August 1972	TM1567044832; 52°03′36″N 1°08′41″E		1374800	Upload Photo	Q26655640
Girls Friendly Society Hostel	II	2, Burlington Road			4 August 1972	TM1569444849; 52°03′36″N 1°08′42″E		1037752	Upload Photo	Q26289468
4-10, Burlington Road	II	4-10, Burlington Road			15 December 1977	TM1566044814; 52°03′35″N 1°08′40″E		1236323	Upload Photo	Q26529557
12 and 14, Burlington Road	II	12 and 14, Burlington Road			15 December 1977	TM1562344777; 52°03′34″N 1°08′38″E		1264661	Upload Photo	Q26555337
9 and 11, Butter Market	II	9 and 11, Butter Market			15 December 1977	TM1629644573; 52°03′26″N 1°09′13″E		1236324	Upload Photo	Q26529558
40, Butter Market	II	40, Butter Market			15 December 1977	TM1642344536; 52°03′25″N 1°09′20″E		1236381	Upload Photo	Q26529614
44, Butter Market	II	44, Butter Market			15 December 1977	TM1643944535; 52°03′25″N 1°09′20″E		1236325	Upload Photo	Q26529559
16, Buttermarket	II	16, Buttermarket			9 February 1989	TM1632844538; 52°03′25″N 1°09′15″E		1237347	Upload Photo	Q26530496
18 and 20, Buttermarket	II	18 and 20, Buttermarket			4 August 1972	TM1633844546; 52°03′25″N 1°09′15″E		1037755	Upload Photo	Q26289471
21, 23 and 23a, Buttermarket	II	21, 23 and 23a, Buttermarket			4 August 1972	TM1635644566; 52°03′26″N 1°09′16″E		1037753	Upload Photo	Q26289469
22-28, Buttermarket	II	22-28, Buttermarket			4 August 1972	TM1634744541; 52°03′25″N 1°09′16″E		1206470	Upload Photo	Q26501685
25-29, Buttermarket	II	25-29, Buttermarket			4 August 1972	TM1637844567; 52°03′26″N 1°09′17″E		1374801	Upload Photo	Q26655641
The Ancient House	I	30, Buttermarket			19 December 1951	TM1638144545; 52°03′25″N 1°09′17″E		1037756	Upload Photo	Q4752862
31 and 33, Buttermarket	II	31 and 33, Buttermarket			4 August 1972	TM1639144566; 52°03′26″N 1°09′18″E		1037754	Upload Photo	Q26289470
35, Buttermarket	II	35, Buttermarket			4 August 1972	TM1639944566; 52°03′26″N 1°09′18″E		1206426	Upload Photo	Q26501644
37-41, Buttermarket	II	37-41, Buttermarket			4 August 1972	TM1640744570; 52°03′26″N 1°09′19″E		1374762	Upload Photo	Q26655607
1, Carr Street	II	1, Carr Street			4 August 1972	TM1648844642; 52°03′28″N 1°09′23″E		1374786	Upload Photo	Q26655629
18, Carr Street	II	18, Carr Street			4 August 1994	TM1653144599; 52°03′27″N 1°09′25″E		1237599	Upload Photo	Q26530726
Church of St John the Baptist	II	Cauldwell Hall Road			6 April 1988	TM1821245026; 52°03′38″N 1°10′54″E		1264123	Upload Photo	Q26554852
Ipswich St John War Memorial	II	Church Of St John The Baptist, Cauldwell Hall Road, IP4 4QE			5 June 2020	TM1823845026; 52°03′38″N 1°10′56″E		1470319	Upload Photo	Q97460515
Anglican Cemetery Chapel in the Old Cemetery	II	Cemetery Road			6 April 1988	TM1721045437; 52°03′53″N 1°10′03″E		1237356	Upload Photo	Q26530504
Non Conformist Cemetery Store in the Old Cemetery	II	Cemetery Road			6 April 1988	TM1726545414; 52°03′52″N 1°10′06″E		1237357	Upload Photo	Q26530505
Milestone Number 67 Outside Avenue Lodge	II	Chantry Park, Crane Hill			15 December 1977	TM1403343751; 52°03′03″N 1°07′12″E		1236695	Upload Photo	Q26529905
Church of All Saints	II	Chevalier Street			6 April 1988	TM1521845358; 52°03′53″N 1°08′18″E		1237358	Upload Photo	Q26530506
Boer War Memorial	II	Christchurch Park			4 August 1994	TM1648844960; 52°03′39″N 1°09′24″E		1237499	Upload Photo	Q26530640
Drinking Fountain	II	Christchurch Park			4 August 1994	TM1618545327; 52°03′51″N 1°09′09″E		1264069	Upload Photo	Q26554805
Former Cabmen's Shelter West of Bolton Lane Entrance to Park	II	Christchurch Park			15 December 1977	TM1665945496; 52°03′56″N 1°09′34″E		1222019	Upload Photo	Q26516376
Ice House about 200 Metres North of Christchurch Mansion	II	Christchurch Park			5 November 1990	TM1660145166; 52°03′45″N 1°09′30″E		1264104	Upload Photo	Q26554835
Martyrs Memorial	II	Christchurch Park			4 August 1994	TM1660345091; 52°03′43″N 1°09′30″E		1237500	Upload Photo	Q26530641
World War I and II Memorial	II	Christchurch Park			4 August 1994	TM1641745000; 52°03′40″N 1°09′20″E		1237533	Upload Photo	Q26530670
Doric House	II	28, Christchurch Street			15 December 1977	TM1685044773; 52°03′32″N 1°09′42″E		1264662	Upload Photo	Q26555338
Holywells Park Orangery	II	Cliff Lane, Holywells Park			4 August 1994	TM1759043379; 52°02′46″N 1°10′18″E		1237504	Upload Photo	Q26530645
Holywells Park Stable Block and Tower	II	Cliff Lane			4 August 1994	TM1762843372; 52°02′46″N 1°10′20″E		1264013	Upload Photo	Q26554757
The Margaret Catchpole Public House	II*	Cliff Lane			13 December 1995	TM1762143280; 52°02′43″N 1°10′19″E		1243454	Upload Photo	Q17535175
Cliff Cottage	II	Cliff Quay			15 December 1977	TM1711843234; 52°02′42″N 1°09′53″E		1264592	Upload Photo	Q26555277
Cliff House	II	Cliff Quay			15 December 1977	TM1708943183; 52°02′40″N 1°09′51″E		1236326	Upload Photo	Q26529560
Tolly Cobbold Brewery	II	Cliff Quay			23 October 1989	TM1707943165; 52°02′40″N 1°09′51″E		1237415	Upload Photo	Q5132551
Church of St Peter	II*	College Street			19 December 1951	TM1635844118; 52°03′11″N 1°09′15″E		1037757	Upload Photo	Q17535005
Gateway to Wolsey's College of St Mary	I	College Street			19 December 1951	TM1637644092; 52°03′11″N 1°09′16″E		1206515	Upload Photo	Q17542716
1-5, College Street	II	1-5, College Street			4 August 1972	TM1640144090; 52°03′11″N 1°09′17″E		1374764	Upload Photo	Q26655608
4, College Street	II	4, College Street			4 August 1972	TM1634244080; 52°03′10″N 1°09′14″E		1037758	Upload Photo	Q26289472
Woodside	II*	Constitution Hill			15 December 1977	TM1594845790; 52°04′06″N 1°08′57″E		1264602	Upload Photo	Q17535186
Drumbeg	II	4, Constitution Hill			14 February 1994	TM1614245857; 52°04′08″N 1°09′08″E		1237477	Upload Photo	Q26530620
Golden Lion Hotel	II	Cornhill			4 August 1972	TM1619144624; 52°03′28″N 1°09′08″E		1037760	Upload Photo	Q26289474
Post Office	II	Cornhill			4 August 1972	TM1625444605; 52°03′27″N 1°09′11″E		1037761	Upload Photo	Q26289475
Town Hall	II	Cornhill			4 August 1972	TM1621244617; 52°03′28″N 1°09′09″E		1206572	Upload Photo	Q18708766
7, Cornhill	II	7, Cornhill			4 August 1972	TM1623044662; 52°03′29″N 1°09′10″E		1206534	Upload Photo	Q26501740
8, Cornhill	II	8, Cornhill			4 August 1972	TM1618344642; 52°03′29″N 1°09′07″E		1374765	Upload Photo	Q26655609
13, Cornhill	II	13, Cornhill			4 August 1972	TM1624844655; 52°03′29″N 1°09′11″E		1037759	Upload Photo	Q26289473
15, Cornhill	II	15, Cornhill			4 August 1972	TM1626344652; 52°03′29″N 1°09′11″E		1206562	Upload Photo	Q26501765
Firbank	II	25, Dalton Road			4 August 1994	TM1561844626; 52°03′29″N 1°08′38″E		1237505	Upload Photo	Q26530646
Church of St Lawrence	II*	Dial Lane			19 December 1951	TM1639144586; 52°03′27″N 1°09′18″E		1206619	Upload Photo	Q7593959
2 and 4, Dial Lane	II	2 and 4, Dial Lane			4 August 1972	TM1636344595; 52°03′27″N 1°09′16″E		1037762	Upload Photo	Q26289476
8, Dial Lane	II	8, Dial Lane			4 August 1972	TM1636444585; 52°03′27″N 1°09′17″E		1037763	Upload Photo	Q26289478
10 and 12, Dial Lane	II	10 and 12, Dial Lane			4 August 1972	TM1636444580; 52°03′26″N 1°09′17″E		1206626	Upload Photo	Q26501826
14, Dial Lane	II	14, Dial Lane			15 December 1977	TM1636144574; 52°03′26″N 1°09′16″E		1236450	Upload Photo	Q26529677
Gipping House	II	Dock Street			15 December 1977	TM1639243933; 52°03′05″N 1°09′17″E		1264603	Upload Photo	Q26555285
Castle Hill United Reformed Church	II	Dryden Road, Castle Hill			25 September 1998	TM1524247237; 52°04′54″N 1°08′24″E		1376607	Upload Photo	Q26657147
2 and 4, Duke Street	II	2 and 4, Duke Street			3 March 1982	TM1704744061; 52°03′09″N 1°09′51″E		1237237	Upload Photo	Q26530397
1 and 3, Eagle Street	II	1 and 3, Eagle Street			15 December 1977	TM1672544391; 52°03′20″N 1°09′35″E		1236451	Upload Photo	Q26529678
5, Eagle Street	II	5, Eagle Street			15 December 1977	TM1673444390; 52°03′20″N 1°09′35″E		1236518	Upload Photo	Q26529743
7, Eagle Street	II	7, Eagle Street			15 December 1977	TM1674044390; 52°03′20″N 1°09′36″E		1236452	Upload Photo	Q26529679
9 and 11, Eagle Street	II	9 and 11, Eagle Street			15 December 1977	TM1674844389; 52°03′20″N 1°09′36″E		1236538	Upload Photo	Q26529761
Church of St Mary at the Elms	II*	Elm Street			19 December 1951	TM1606044541; 52°03′26″N 1°09′00″E		1037764	Upload Photo	Q7401867
Smith's Almshouses	II	Elm Street			19 December 1951	TM1607144507; 52°03′24″N 1°09′01″E		1037766	Upload Photo	Q26289480
Churchyard	II	1, Elm Street			19 December 1951	TM1604944566; 52°03′26″N 1°09′00″E		1037765	Upload Photo	Q26289479
4 and 6, Elm Street	II	4 and 6, Elm Street			15 December 1977	TM1615944560; 52°03′26″N 1°09′06″E		1264604	Upload Photo	Q26555286
25, Elm Street	II	25, Elm Street, IP1 2AD			19 December 1951	TM1607844488; 52°03′24″N 1°09′01″E		1206638	Upload Photo	Q26501837
29-33, Elm Street	II	29-33, Elm Street			4 August 1972	TM1604844515; 52°03′25″N 1°09′00″E		1206650	Upload Photo	Q26501849
3 and 5, Falcon Street	II	3 and 5, Falcon Street			4 August 1972	TM1625944450; 52°03′22″N 1°09′11″E		1037767	Upload Photo	Q26289481
42-48, Felaw Street	II	42-48, Felaw Street			4 August 1972	TM1665443697; 52°02′57″N 1°09′30″E		1037768	Upload Photo	Q26289482
5-15, Fonnereau Road	II	5-15, Fonnereau Road			4 August 1972	TM1644744826; 52°03′34″N 1°09′21″E		1206678	Upload Photo	Q26501874
St Mary Le Tower Vicarage	II	8, Fonnereau Road			4 August 1994	TM1630645029; 52°03′41″N 1°09′14″E		1247663	Upload Photo	Q26539953
The Towers	II	12 and 14, Fonnereau Road			4 August 1994	TM1626545052; 52°03′42″N 1°09′12″E		1237506	Upload Photo	Q26530647
16, Fonnereau Road	II	16, Fonnereau Road			4 August 1994	TM1623845063; 52°03′42″N 1°09′11″E		1247676	Upload Photo	Q26539964
17-27, Fonnereau Road	II	17-27, Fonnereau Road			4 August 1972	TM1643744858; 52°03′35″N 1°09′21″E		1374767	Upload Photo	Q26655611
Sunnyside	II	20, Fonnereau Road			4 August 1994	TM1620445088; 52°03′43″N 1°09′09″E		1247680	Upload Photo	Q26539968
Chandos House and Attached Steps	II	24, Fonnereau Road			4 August 1994	TM1618445096; 52°03′43″N 1°09′08″E		1247681	Upload Photo	Q26539969
Ywca	II	43, Fonnereau Road			4 August 1972	TM1629344965; 52°03′39″N 1°09′14″E		1037726	Upload Photo	Q26289439
Ywca	II	45, Fonnereau Road			4 August 1972	TM1627844973; 52°03′39″N 1°09′13″E		1374787	Upload Photo	Q26687099
47, Fonnereau Road	II	47, Fonnereau Road			4 August 1972	TM1626144980; 52°03′39″N 1°09′12″E		1037727	Upload Photo	Q26289440
51, Fonnereau Road	II	51, Fonnereau Road			4 August 1994	TM1622744996; 52°03′40″N 1°09′10″E		1263987	Upload Photo	Q26554731
65, Fonnereau Road	II	65, Fonnereau Road			4 August 1972	TM1614345049; 52°03′42″N 1°09′06″E		1037728	Upload Photo	Q26289441
Church of the Holy Trinity	II	Fore Hamlet			15 December 1977	TM1718644082; 52°03′09″N 1°09′58″E		1236453	Upload Photo	Q26529680
Holy Trinity Church Hall	II	Fore Hamlet			15 December 1977	TM1719044064; 52°03′09″N 1°09′59″E		1236571	Upload Photo	Q26529790
The Lord Nelson Inn	II	Fore Street			4 August 1972	TM1682344178; 52°03′13″N 1°09′40″E		1037733	Upload Photo	Q26289447
Warehouse Attached to West of Warehouse (the Crossway) at Rear of Numbers 80 and 80a Fore Street	II*	Fore Street			19 December 1951	TM1680844120; 52°03′11″N 1°09′39″E		1096034	Upload Photo	Q17535027
Warehouse or Store at Rear of Numbers 54 to 58 (even)	II	Fore Street			20 March 1975	TM1675344158; 52°03′12″N 1°09′36″E		1264741	Upload Photo	Q26555411
Spread Eagle Inn	II	1 and 3, Fore Street			4 August 1972	TM1672344374; 52°03′19″N 1°09′35″E		1374788	Upload Photo	Q26655631
5-9, Fore Street	II	5-9, Fore Street			4 August 1972	TM1671944365; 52°03′19″N 1°09′35″E		1037729	Upload Photo	Q26289443
Co-operative Education Centre	II	11, Fore Street			4 August 1972	TM1672944349; 52°03′18″N 1°09′35″E		1374789	Upload Photo	Q26655632
13 and 15, Fore Street	II	13 and 15, Fore Street			4 August 1972	TM1671244338; 52°03′18″N 1°09′34″E		1037730	Upload Photo	Q26289444
17, Fore Street	II	17, Fore Street			4 August 1972	TM1671344322; 52°03′18″N 1°09′34″E		1037731	Upload Photo	Q26289445
19-23, Fore Street	II	19-23, Fore Street			19 December 1951	TM1671144316; 52°03′17″N 1°09′34″E		1374790	Upload Photo	Q26655633
24, Fore Street	II*	24, Fore Street			19 December 1951	TM1669744271; 52°03′16″N 1°09′33″E		1374792	Upload Photo	Q17535210
25, Fore Street	II	25, Fore Street			4 August 1972	TM1671344301; 52°03′17″N 1°09′34″E		1037732	Upload Photo	Q26289446
26 and 28, Fore Street	II	26 and 28, Fore Street			4 August 1972	TM1670244255; 52°03′15″N 1°09′33″E		1355145	Upload Photo	Q26638025
27 and 29, Fore Street	II	27 and 29, Fore Street			4 August 1972	TM1670944294; 52°03′17″N 1°09′34″E		1374791	Upload Photo	Q26655634
31 and 33, Fore Street	II	31 and 33, Fore Street			15 December 1977	TM1670944283; 52°03′16″N 1°09′34″E		1264605	Upload Photo	Q26555287
35 and 37, Fore Street	II	35 and 37, Fore Street			15 December 1977	TM1671444269; 52°03′16″N 1°09′34″E		1236574	Upload Photo	Q26529793
42, Fore Street	II	42, Fore Street			15 December 1977	TM1674144212; 52°03′14″N 1°09′35″E		1236456	Upload Photo	Q26529683
44, Fore Street	II	44, Fore Street			15 December 1977	TM1674344206; 52°03′14″N 1°09′36″E		1236619	Upload Photo	Q26529831
46-52, Fore Street	II	46-52, Fore Street			15 December 1977	TM1676244191; 52°03′13″N 1°09′36″E		1264567	Upload Photo	Q26555255
53 and 55, Fore Street	II	53 and 55, Fore Street			15 December 1977	TM1675344227; 52°03′14″N 1°09′36″E		1236454	Upload Photo	Q26529681
54-58, Fore Street	II*	54-58, Fore Street			20 March 1975	TM1677144185; 52°03′13″N 1°09′37″E		1236157	Upload Photo	Q17535169
57, Fore Street	II	57, Fore Street			20 May 1981	TM1676244220; 52°03′14″N 1°09′37″E		1236902	Upload Photo	Q26530098
60 and 62, Fore Street	II	60 and 62, Fore Street			4 August 1972	TM1677444178; 52°03′13″N 1°09′37″E		1037735	Upload Photo	Q26289449
71 and 71a, Fore Street	II	71 and 71a, Fore Street			15 December 1977	TM1679944186; 52°03′13″N 1°09′38″E		1236589	Upload Photo	Q26529806
73 and 75, Fore Street	II	73 and 75, Fore Street			15 December 1977	TM1680244179; 52°03′13″N 1°09′39″E		1236455	Upload Photo	Q26529682
80 and 80a Fore Street Including Warehouses to Rear (the Sale Room, The Crossway and Warehouse to South Fronting Wherry Quay)	I	80 and 80a, Fore Street			19 December 1951	TM1682544109; 52°03′11″N 1°09′40″E		1025070	Upload Photo	Q17542691
84, Fore Street	II	84, Fore Street			19 December 1951	TM1684644132; 52°03′11″N 1°09′41″E		1037736	Upload Photo	Q26289450
86, Fore Street	II*	86, Fore Street			19 December 1951	TM1685544132; 52°03′11″N 1°09′41″E		1355165	Upload Photo	Q17535201
88, Fore Street	II*	88, Fore Street			19 December 1951	TM1686144129; 52°03′11″N 1°09′42″E		1374794	Upload Photo	Q17535252
89 and 91, Fore Street	II	89 and 91, Fore Street			15 December 1977	TM1684544160; 52°03′12″N 1°09′41″E		1264522	Upload Photo	Q26555212
90 and 92, Fore Street	II	90 and 92, Fore Street			4 August 1972	TM1686744125; 52°03′11″N 1°09′42″E		1355172	Upload Photo	Q26638046
97, Fore Street	II	97, Fore Street			15 December 1977	TM1685944155; 52°03′12″N 1°09′41″E		1264566	Upload Photo	Q26555254
119, Fore Street	II	119, Fore Street			4 August 1972	TM1695044142; 52°03′11″N 1°09′46″E		1037734	Upload Photo	Q26289448
123, Fore Street	II	123, Fore Street			2 February 1976	TM1696444126; 52°03′11″N 1°09′47″E		1236159	Upload Photo	Q26529411
125, Fore Street	II	125, Fore Street			2 February 1976	TM1697144125; 52°03′11″N 1°09′47″E		1236161	Upload Photo	Q26529413
127, Fore Street	II	127, Fore Street			2 February 1976	TM1698044123; 52°03′11″N 1°09′48″E		1236162	Upload Photo	Q26529414
132-138, Fore Street	II	132-138, Fore Street			19 December 1951	TM1703144077; 52°03′09″N 1°09′50″E		1037737	Upload Photo	Q26289451
Tooley Court	II	Foundation Street			4 August 1972	TM1660344278; 52°03′16″N 1°09′28″E		1037738	Upload Photo	Q26289454
32, Foundation Street	II	32, Foundation Street			15 December 1977	TM1656244290; 52°03′17″N 1°09′26″E		1236637	Upload Photo	Q26529849
Church of St Nicholas	II*	Friars Road			19 December 1951	TM1617344284; 52°03′17″N 1°09′06″E		1187192	Upload Photo	Q17535037
The Willis Building	I	Friars Street			25 April 1991	TM1611144378; 52°03′20″N 1°09′03″E		1237417	Upload Photo	Q1134093
Unitarian Chapel	I	Friars Street			19 December 1951	TM1618744378; 52°03′20″N 1°09′07″E		1037739	Upload Photo	Q7887197
Pond Hall	II	Gainsborough Lane			4 August 1972	TM1806741062; 52°01′30″N 1°10′38″E		1052271	Upload Photo	Q26304065
Gippeswyk Hall	II*	Gippeswyk Avenue			19 December 1951	TM1525843731; 52°03′01″N 1°08′17″E		1037740	Upload Photo	Q17534998
68, Grimwade Street	II	68, Grimwade Street			4 August 1972	TM1691544190; 52°03′13″N 1°09′45″E		1037741	Upload Photo	Q26289455
77, Grimwade Street	II	77, Grimwade Street			19 December 1951	TM1695444198; 52°03′13″N 1°09′47″E		1052230	Upload Photo	Q26304028
83, Grimwade Street	II	83, Grimwade Street			19 December 1951	TM1695244162; 52°03′12″N 1°09′46″E		1037742	Upload Photo	Q26289457
Gate House and Entrance Gatepiers to Chantry Park	II	Hadleigh Road, Chantry Park			15 December 1977	TM1381744311; 52°03′21″N 1°07′02″E		1236640	Upload Photo	Q26529852
1, Hatton Court	II	1, Hatton Court			4 August 1972	TM1641244630; 52°03′28″N 1°09′19″E		1235751	Upload Photo	Q26529054
2 and 3, Hatton Court	II	2 and 3, Hatton Court			4 August 1972	TM1641444646; 52°03′28″N 1°09′19″E		1052214	Upload Photo	Q26304014
Barn at Sparrowe's Farm	II	Henley Road			4 August 1972	TM1602147926; 52°05′15″N 1°09′06″E		1187252	Upload Photo	Q26482473
Barn to Sparrowe's Nest	II	Henley Road			4 August 1972	TM1598547872; 52°05′13″N 1°09′04″E		1374795	Upload Photo	Q26655635
Chapel to Ipswich School	II	Henley Road			4 August 1972	TM1612945361; 52°03′52″N 1°09′06″E		1037744	Upload Photo	Q26289459
Ipswich School	II	Henley Road			4 August 1972	TM1612045365; 52°03′52″N 1°09′06″E		1037743	Upload Photo	Q6065634
Sparrowe's Farmhouse	II	Henley Road			4 August 1972	TM1603147900; 52°05′14″N 1°09′07″E		1037745	Upload Photo	Q26289460
Sparrowe's Nest	II	Henley Road			4 August 1972	TM1599147780; 52°05′10″N 1°09′04″E		1052224	Upload Photo	Q26304023
8, Henley Road	II	8, Henley Road			4 August 1994	TM1619245560; 52°03′58″N 1°09′10″E		1247682	Upload Photo	Q26539970
Ipswich School	II	25, Henley Road, IP1 3SG			3 August 2018	TM1604545318; 52°03′51″N 1°09′01″E		1436599	Upload Photo	Q66477720
Colne House	II	51, Henley Road			4 August 1994	TM1612145518; 52°03′57″N 1°09′06″E		1263988	Upload Photo	Q26554732
Highfield Lodge	II	77, Henley Road			4 August 1994	TM1617345892; 52°04′09″N 1°09′09″E		1247683	Upload Photo	Q26539971
Art Gallery	II	High Street			15 December 1977	TM1607744903; 52°03′37″N 1°09′02″E		1264500	Upload Photo	Q26555190
Ipswich Museum Including the 1893 Addition to North and the Art Gallery to South	II*	High Street			4 August 1972	TM1607844941; 52°03′38″N 1°09′02″E		1187258	Upload Photo	Q17535047
21, 23 and 25, High Street	II	21, 23 and 25, High Street			22 October 1971	TM1608244842; 52°03′35″N 1°09′02″E		1037746	Upload Photo	Q26289461
27-35, High Street	II	27-35, High Street			15 December 1977	TM1608644871; 52°03′36″N 1°09′03″E		1264499	Upload Photo	Q26555189
Everton School	II	Humber Doucy Lane			16 March 1966	TM1832046977; 52°04′41″N 1°11′05″E		1374796	Upload Photo	Q26655636
Humber Doucy House	II	Humber Doucy Lane			4 August 1972	TM1966845672; 52°03′57″N 1°12′12″E		1037706	Upload Photo	Q26289420
Temple of Remembrance	II	Ipswich Cemetery, Belvedere Road			24 May 2005	TM1762345965; 52°04′09″N 1°10′26″E		1393856	Upload Photo	Q26672993
Church of St Mary at the Quay	II*	Key Street			19 December 1951	TM1651444095; 52°03′11″N 1°09′23″E		1037707	Upload Photo	Q7594621
The Old Custom House	II*	Key Street			19 December 1951	TM1668344092; 52°03′10″N 1°09′32″E		1374818	Upload Photo	Q17535282
35, Key Street	II	35, Key Street			20 January 1976	TM1666544124; 52°03′11″N 1°09′31″E		1236158	Upload Photo	Q26529410
Corn Exchange	II	King Street			4 August 1972	TM1621344585; 52°03′27″N 1°09′09″E		1374819	Upload Photo	Q26655656
Swan Inn	II	King Street			4 August 1972	TM1620244556; 52°03′26″N 1°09′08″E		1037708	Upload Photo	Q26289421
Rushmere Hall Primary School	II	20a, Lanark Road, IP4 3EJ			25 July 2013	TM1862346220; 52°04′16″N 1°11′19″E		1415661	Upload Photo	Q26676460
All Hallows Church	II	Landseer Road			14 May 2010	TM1812142325; 52°02′11″N 1°10′43″E		1393790	Upload Photo	Q26672933
The White House	II	Limerick Close			28 March 1988	TM1415446926; 52°04′45″N 1°07′26″E		1264102	Upload Photo	Q26554833
Building Formerly Occupied by H Warner and Son Limited	II	Lion Street			2 February 1976	TM1617244599; 52°03′27″N 1°09′06″E		1236164	Upload Photo	Q26529416
Crane Hall	II	London Road			20 March 1980	TM1440844149; 52°03′15″N 1°07′33″E		1236901	Upload Photo	Q26530097
Milestone 68 Outside Number 142	II	London Road			15 December 1977	TM1524044730; 52°03′33″N 1°08′18″E		1236643	Upload Photo	Q26529856
The Hollies	II	49, London Road			15 December 1977	TM1544244812; 52°03′35″N 1°08′29″E		1264501	Upload Photo	Q26555191
121, London Road	II	121, London Road, Mile End			19 April 2004	TM1521544671; 52°03′31″N 1°08′16″E		1390635	Upload Photo	Q26670021
1 and 3, Lower Brook Street	II	1 and 3, Lower Brook Street			4 August 1972	TM1647844425; 52°03′21″N 1°09′22″E		1374783	Upload Photo	Q26655626
6, Lower Brook Street	II	6, Lower Brook Street			19 December 1951	TM1645344397; 52°03′20″N 1°09′21″E		1037709	Upload Photo	Q26289422
7 and 9, Lower Brook Street	II	7 and 9, Lower Brook Street			19 December 1951	TM1646944373; 52°03′20″N 1°09′22″E		1207362	Upload Photo	Q26502516
8, Lower Brook Street	II	8, Lower Brook Street			19 December 1951	TM1645144379; 52°03′20″N 1°09′21″E		1037710	Upload Photo	Q26289423
10, Lower Brook Street	II	10, Lower Brook Street			19 December 1951	TM1645444368; 52°03′19″N 1°09′21″E		1374820	Upload Photo	Q26655657
Knapton House	II	12, Lower Brook Street			19 December 1951	TM1645244352; 52°03′19″N 1°09′21″E		1037711	Upload Photo	Q26289424
14, Lower Brook Street	II	14, Lower Brook Street			19 December 1951	TM1645144332; 52°03′18″N 1°09′21″E		1374821	Upload Photo	Q26655658
Borough and County Central Club	II	15, Lower Brook Street			19 December 1951	TM1648344311; 52°03′18″N 1°09′22″E		1037714	Upload Photo	Q26289427
16, Lower Brook Street	II	16, Lower Brook Street			19 December 1951	TM1645544318; 52°03′18″N 1°09′21″E		1037712	Upload Photo	Q26289425
18 and 18a, Lower Brook Street	II	18 and 18a, Lower Brook Street			4 August 1972	TM1644444298; 52°03′17″N 1°09′20″E		1374782	Upload Photo	Q26655625
19 and 21, Lower Brook Street	II	19 and 21, Lower Brook Street			4 August 1972	TM1649244276; 52°03′16″N 1°09′23″E		1279750	Upload Photo	Q26568944
20, Lower Brook Street	II	20, Lower Brook Street			15 December 1977	TM1645144277; 52°03′16″N 1°09′20″E		1264502	Upload Photo	Q26555192
23 and 25 Lower Brook Street, Non Civil Parish	II	23 and 25, Lower Brook Street			4 August 1972	TM1647644269; 52°03′16″N 1°09′22″E		1374784	Upload Photo	Q26655627
27-35, Lower Brook Street	II	27-35, Lower Brook Street			19 December 1951	TM1646944223; 52°03′15″N 1°09′21″E		1037715	Upload Photo	Q26289428
30a, Lower Brook Street	II	30a, Lower Brook Street			4 August 1972	TM1644544188; 52°03′14″N 1°09′20″E		1037713	Upload Photo	Q26289426
32, Lower Brook Street	II	32, Lower Brook Street			4 August 1972	TM1644244179; 52°03′13″N 1°09′20″E		1298716	Upload Photo	Q26586175
37, Lower Brook Street	II	37, Lower Brook Street			4 August 1972	TM1646144197; 52°03′14″N 1°09′21″E		1279752	Upload Photo	Q26568946
Conservative Office	II	39, Lower Brook Street			4 August 1972	TM1646144188; 52°03′14″N 1°09′21″E		1037716	Upload Photo	Q26289429
Wesleyan Methodist Church	II	Museum Street			6 April 1988	TM1604644600; 52°03′27″N 1°09′00″E		1237359	Upload Photo	Q26530507
1 and 3, Museum Street	II	1 and 3, Museum Street			15 December 1977	TM1609244684; 52°03′30″N 1°09′02″E		1236723	Upload Photo	Q26529931
2, Museum Street	II	2, Museum Street			4 August 1972	TM1608044699; 52°03′31″N 1°09′02″E		1236080	Upload Photo	Q26529342
5 and 7, Museum Street	II	5 and 7, Museum Street			19 December 1951	TM1608744638; 52°03′29″N 1°09′02″E		1207371	Upload Photo	Q26502525
9 and 11, Museum Street	II	9 and 11, Museum Street			19 December 1951	TM1608744625; 52°03′28″N 1°09′02″E		1037717	Upload Photo	Q26289431
10, Museum Street	II	10, Museum Street			15 December 1977	TM1606844658; 52°03′29″N 1°09′01″E		1236645	Upload Photo	Q26529858
Old Museum Rooms	II	13, Museum Street			19 December 1951	TM1608544605; 52°03′28″N 1°09′02″E		1037718	Upload Photo	Q26289432
14, Museum Street	II	14, Museum Street			4 August 1972	TM1606844633; 52°03′29″N 1°09′01″E		1037719	Upload Photo	Q26289433
16, Museum Street	II	16, Museum Street			4 August 1972	TM1605744619; 52°03′28″N 1°09′01″E		1037720	Upload Photo	Q26289434
18 and 20, Museum Street	II	18 and 20, Museum Street			19 December 1951	TM1606144586; 52°03′27″N 1°09′01″E		1207395	Upload Photo	Q26502548
21, Museum Street	II	21, Museum Street			4 August 1972	TM1611244524; 52°03′25″N 1°09′03″E		1279762	Upload Photo	Q26568955
22, Museum Street	II	22, Museum Street			19 December 1951	TM1607944577; 52°03′27″N 1°09′02″E		1037721	Upload Photo	Q26289435
24-30, Museum Street	II	24-30, Museum Street			19 December 1951	TM1607844566; 52°03′26″N 1°09′01″E		1279767	Upload Photo	Q26568960
32, Museum Street	II	32, Museum Street			4 August 1972	TM1608844541; 52°03′26″N 1°09′02″E		1037722	Upload Photo	Q26289436
Terminal Building at Ipswich Airport	II	Nacton Road			13 November 1996	TM1947941768; 52°01′51″N 1°11′53″E		1268271	Upload Photo	Q26558594
The Golden Hind Hotel	II	Nacton Road			13 December 1995	TM1892342291; 52°02′09″N 1°11′25″E		1243455	Upload Photo	Q26536130
17 and 19, Neale Street	II	17 and 19, Neale Street			4 August 1972	TM1638944916; 52°03′37″N 1°09′19″E		1037723	Upload Photo	Q26289437
Church of St Bartholomew	II	Newton Road			6 April 1988	TM1809743855; 52°03′01″N 1°10′46″E		1237360	Upload Photo	Q26530508
Garden Wall to Number 9	II	Northgate Street			4 August 1972	TM1644544718; 52°03′31″N 1°09′21″E		1374785	Upload Photo	Q26655628
Ipswich and Suffolk County Club	II	Northgate Street			19 December 1951	TM1645344751; 52°03′32″N 1°09′22″E		1037725	Upload Photo	Q26289438
Ipswich Public Library	II	Northgate Street			15 December 1977	TM1649544733; 52°03′31″N 1°09′24″E		1236725	Upload Photo	Q26529932
Pykenham's Gateway and Brick Boundary Wall	I	Northgate Street			19 December 1951	TM1647344757; 52°03′32″N 1°09′23″E		1207459	Upload Photo	Q17542727
Walls Immediately North West and North East of Ipswich and Suffolk County Club	II	Northgate Street			25 February 1993	TM1643244772; 52°03′33″N 1°09′21″E		1264095	Upload Photo	Q26554826
Sketchley	II	3, Northgate Street			4 August 1972	TM1647244677; 52°03′29″N 1°09′22″E		1207410	Upload Photo	Q26502560
Pykenham	I	7, Northgate Street			19 December 1951	TM1646544704; 52°03′30″N 1°09′22″E		1037724	Upload Photo	Q17542700
8 and 10, Northgate Street	II	8 and 10, Northgate Street			4 August 1972	TM1648844664; 52°03′29″N 1°09′23″E		1037685	Upload Photo	Q26289400
9, Northgate Street	II	9, Northgate Street			19 December 1951	TM1646544719; 52°03′31″N 1°09′22″E		1279713	Upload Photo	Q26568911
11, Northgate Street	II	11, Northgate Street			15 December 1977	TM1647144768; 52°03′32″N 1°09′23″E		1236726	Upload Photo	Q26529933
12, Northgate Street	II	12, Northgate Street			4 August 1972	TM1648744697; 52°03′30″N 1°09′23″E		1374807	Upload Photo	Q26655647
13, Northgate Street	II	13, Northgate Street			15 December 1977	TM1646744775; 52°03′33″N 1°09′22″E		1236647	Upload Photo	Q26529860
14 and 14a, Northgate Street	II	14 and 14a, Northgate Street			19 December 1951	TM1648744711; 52°03′30″N 1°09′23″E		1207484	Upload Photo	Q26502627
Halberd Inn	II	15, Northgate Street			15 December 1977	TM1646444785; 52°03′33″N 1°09′22″E		1264504	Upload Photo	Q26555194
16, Northgate Street	II	16, Northgate Street			19 December 1951	TM1648744720; 52°03′31″N 1°09′23″E		1037686	Upload Photo	Q26289401
26 and 28, Northgate Street	II	26 and 28, Northgate Street			4 August 1972	TM1649044762; 52°03′32″N 1°09′24″E		1207494	Upload Photo	Q26502638
Milestone 1 at South East Junction of Norwich Road and Chevallier Street	II	Norwich Road			15 December 1977	TM1532645397; 52°03′54″N 1°08′24″E		1236730	Upload Photo	Q26529938
The Suffolk Punch Public House	II	Norwich Road			13 December 1995	TM1478146107; 52°04′18″N 1°07′57″E		1272878	Upload Photo	Q26562681
139-167, Norwich Road	II	139-167, Norwich Road			4 August 1972	TM1541945201; 52°03′48″N 1°08′28″E		1374808	Upload Photo	Q26655648
152, Norwich Road	II	152, Norwich Road			4 August 1972	TM1547945196; 52°03′48″N 1°08′32″E		1037688	Upload Photo	Q26289404
156 and 158, Norwich Road	II	156 and 158, Norwich Road			4 August 1994	TM1546345245; 52°03′49″N 1°08′31″E		1247751	Upload Photo	Q26540031
Taylor House	II	160-162, Norwich Road			4 August 1994	TM1545245273; 52°03′50″N 1°08′30″E		1247684	Upload Photo	Q26539972
Ymca Club	II	169 and 171, Norwich Road			4 August 1972	TM1537645272; 52°03′50″N 1°08′26″E		1037687	Upload Photo	Q26289402
274, Norwich Road	II	274, Norwich Road			16 June 1987	TM1523845561; 52°04′00″N 1°08′20″E		1237267	Upload Photo	Q26530422
714, Norwich Road	II	714, Norwich Road, Whitton			15 December 1977	TM1410947523; 52°05′05″N 1°07′25″E		1236739	Upload Photo	Q26529945
720, Norwich Road	II	720, Norwich Road, Whitton			15 December 1977	TM1410147550; 52°05′06″N 1°07′25″E		1236648	Upload Photo	Q26529861
Fairmead	II	726, Norwich Road, Whitton			15 December 1977	TM1409247589; 52°05′07″N 1°07′24″E		1264505	Upload Photo	Q26555195
Street Farmhouse	II	728, Norwich Road, Whitton			4 August 1972	TM1408547622; 52°05′08″N 1°07′24″E		1207521	Upload Photo	Q26502665
Corporation Farmhouse	II	785, Norwich Road, Whitton			15 December 1977	TM1406147592; 52°05′07″N 1°07′23″E		1236649	Upload Photo	Q26529862
Whitton Lodge	II	799, Norwich Road			4 August 1972	TM1404447687; 52°05′10″N 1°07′22″E		1207513	Upload Photo	Q26502657
Rockwork Garden Feature Approx 80-150m South-east of Oakhill	II	Oak Hill Lane			10 October 2000	TM1593643250; 52°02′44″N 1°08′51″E		1389100	Upload Photo	Q26668542
St Mary Le Tower Church House	II	Oak Lane			4 August 1972	TM1644744708; 52°03′30″N 1°09′21″E		1374809	Upload Photo	Q26655649
Oakhill	II	Oakhill Lane			4 August 1994	TM1585243329; 52°02′47″N 1°08′47″E		1263952	Upload Photo	Q26554697
Bluecoat Boy Public House	II	Old Cattle Market			9 September 1987	TM1636244396; 52°03′20″N 1°09′16″E		1237240	Upload Photo	Q26530400
Plough Inn	II	Old Cattle Market			15 December 1977	TM1640444415; 52°03′21″N 1°09′18″E		1236650	Upload Photo	Q26529863
Church of St Pancras	II	Orwell Place, IP4 1BD			6 April 1988	TM1666544412; 52°03′21″N 1°09′32″E		1264101	Upload Photo	Q3540916
Unicorn Inn	II	2, Orwell Place			15 December 1977	TM1663244372; 52°03′19″N 1°09′30″E		1236651	Upload Photo	Q26529864
4, Orwell Place	II	4, Orwell Place			15 December 1977	TM1664844374; 52°03′19″N 1°09′31″E		1264397	Upload Photo	Q26555096
6, Orwell Place	II	6, Orwell Place			15 December 1977	TM1666844369; 52°03′19″N 1°09′32″E		1264507	Upload Photo	Q26555197
8-12, Orwell Place	II	8-12, Orwell Place			4 August 1972	TM1667444366; 52°03′19″N 1°09′32″E		1374810	Upload Photo	Q26655650
9 and 11, Orwell Place	II	9 and 11, Orwell Place			4 August 1972	TM1667944392; 52°03′20″N 1°09′33″E		1037689	Upload Photo	Q26289405
13, Orwell Place	II	13, Orwell Place			4 August 1972	TM1668944390; 52°03′20″N 1°09′33″E		1207535	Upload Photo	Q26502680
14, Orwell Place	II	14, Orwell Place			4 August 1972	TM1669444366; 52°03′19″N 1°09′33″E		1207547	Upload Photo	Q26502693
17, Orwell Place	II	17, Orwell Place			15 December 1977	TM1669544389; 52°03′20″N 1°09′33″E		1236961	Upload Photo	Q26530152
Hillcrest	II	27, Paget Road			4 August 1994	TM1564145477; 52°03′56″N 1°08′41″E		1263989	Upload Photo	Q26554733
Church of St Matthew	II*	Portman Road			19 December 1951	TM1581444723; 52°03′32″N 1°08′48″E		1037690	Upload Photo	Q17534974
Paul's Maltings Including Adjoining Kiln	II	Princes Street			22 April 1980	TM1573743991; 52°03′08″N 1°08′42″E		1264204	Upload Photo	Q26554928
Premises Occupied by National Westminster Bank	II	Princes Street			4 August 1972	TM1621244554; 52°03′26″N 1°09′08″E		1037691	Upload Photo	Q26289406
Sun Alliance Offices	II	35, Princes Street			4 August 1994	TM1615144451; 52°03′23″N 1°09′05″E		1247685	Upload Photo	Q26539973
8, Queens Street	II	8, Queens Street			4 August 1972	TM1622644518; 52°03′25″N 1°09′09″E		1374811	Upload Photo	Q26655651
10 and 12, Queens Street	II	10 and 12, Queens Street			4 August 1972	TM1621744505; 52°03′24″N 1°09′09″E		1037692	Upload Photo	Q26289407
Walls Enclosing Jews' Burial Ground	II	Salthouse Street			11 August 2008	TM1672344172; 52°03′13″N 1°09′34″E		1392713	Upload Photo	Q26671921
Remains of Black Friars Priory	II	School Street			19 December 1951	TM1665644325; 52°03′18″N 1°09′31″E		1265022	Upload Photo	Q26555653
Broomhill Pool	II	Sherrington Road			24 August 2001	TM1537645788; 52°04′07″N 1°08′27″E		1389400	Upload Photo	Q4975326
240, Sidegate Lane	II	240, Sidegate Lane			25 July 1978	TM1825746130; 52°04′14″N 1°10′59″E		1264356	Upload Photo	Q26555056
1, Silent Street	II*	1, Silent Street			19 December 1951	TM1626344303; 52°03′18″N 1°09′11″E		1265084	Upload Photo	Q17535193
3-9, Silent Street	II*	3-9, Silent Street			19 December 1951	TM1626644306; 52°03′18″N 1°09′11″E		1235576	Upload Photo	Q17535117
6, Silent Street	II	6, Silent Street			15 December 1977	TM1629244289; 52°03′17″N 1°09′12″E		1236895	Upload Photo	Q26530090
8, Silent Street	II	8, Silent Street			15 December 1977	TM1629144298; 52°03′17″N 1°09′12″E		1236896	Upload Photo	Q26530091
15-17, Silent Street	II	15-17, Silent Street			8 January 1986	TM1628644331; 52°03′18″N 1°09′12″E		1264210	Upload Photo	Q26554934
24, Silent Street	II	24, Silent Street			15 December 1977	TM1633644354; 52°03′19″N 1°09′15″E		1264392	Upload Photo	Q26555091
28, Silent Street	II	28, Silent Street			4 August 1972	TM1634444365; 52°03′19″N 1°09′15″E		1265012	Upload Photo	Q26555643
30, Silent Street	II	30, Silent Street			19 December 1951	TM1634844371; 52°03′20″N 1°09′15″E		1235593	Upload Photo	Q26528907
32, Silent Street	II	32, Silent Street			19 December 1951	TM1634744382; 52°03′20″N 1°09′15″E		1235594	Upload Photo	Q26528908
Ipswich Labour Club and Institute	II	33 and 35, Silent Street			4 August 1972	TM1631444398; 52°03′21″N 1°09′13″E		1235581	Upload Photo	Q26528894
37 and 37a, Silent Street	II	37 and 37a, Silent Street			4 August 1972	TM1632744400; 52°03′21″N 1°09′14″E		1265007	Upload Photo	Q26555638
Brick Wall to St Margaret's Churchyard	II	Soane Street			19 December 1951	TM1659944815; 52°03′34″N 1°09′29″E		1265014	Upload Photo	Q26555645
Entrance Wall and Gates to Christchurch Park	II	Soane Street			4 August 1972	TM1656944817; 52°03′34″N 1°09′28″E		1235599	Upload Photo	Q26528912
Freemasons Hall	II	Soane Street			15 December 1977	TM1658344795; 52°03′33″N 1°09′28″E		1264393	Upload Photo	Q26555092
Lodge to Christchurch Mansion	II	1, Soane Street			4 August 1972	TM1654044813; 52°03′34″N 1°09′26″E		1265013	Upload Photo	Q26555644
2, Soane Street	II*	2, Soane Street			19 December 1951	TM1654344794; 52°03′33″N 1°09′26″E		1235595	Upload Photo	Q17535124
4, Soane Street	II	4, Soane Street			4 August 1972	TM1655344791; 52°03′33″N 1°09′27″E		1235596	Upload Photo	Q26528909
6, Soane Street	II	6, Soane Street			4 August 1972	TM1656044792; 52°03′33″N 1°09′27″E		1235597	Upload Photo	Q26528910
8, Soane Street	II	8, Soane Street			4 August 1972	TM1657044794; 52°03′33″N 1°09′28″E		1235598	Upload Photo	Q26528911
Cast Iron Bollards	II	St Clement's Church Lane			4 August 1972	TM1692644192; 52°03′13″N 1°09′45″E		1279645	Upload Photo	Q26568848
Church of St Clement	II*	St Clement's Church Lane			19 December 1951	TM1687344222; 52°03′14″N 1°09′42″E		1374812	Upload Photo	Q17535265
Store to Ipswich Museum and Art Gallery	II	St George's Street			15 December 1977	TM1605644910; 52°03′38″N 1°09′01″E		1264398	Upload Photo	Q26555097
24, St George's Street	II	24, St George's Street			22 October 1971	TM1602644834; 52°03′35″N 1°08′59″E		1207661	Upload Photo	Q26502801
25-35, St George's Street	II	25-35, St George's Street			15 December 1977	TM1603644926; 52°03′38″N 1°09′00″E		1236652	Upload Photo	Q26529865
K6 Telephone Kiosk	II	St Helens Street			28 October 1987	TM1689244526; 52°03′24″N 1°09′44″E		1264148	Upload Photo	Q26554877
Water Lily Public House	II	St Helens Street			16 June 1987	TM1708244511; 52°03′23″N 1°09′54″E		1237282	Upload Photo	Q26530435
The Ipswich Regent Theatre	II	3, St Helens Street			5 October 2000	TM1677144617; 52°03′27″N 1°09′38″E		1385027	Upload Photo	Q7308113
Moyes Butchers	II	98, St Helens Street			16 June 1987	TM1707544510; 52°03′23″N 1°09′54″E		1237239	Upload Photo	Q26530399
Robertsons	II	102, St Helens Street			16 June 1987	TM1709344512; 52°03′23″N 1°09′55″E		1264211	Upload Photo	Q26554935
Church of St Helen	II	St Helen's Street			19 December 1951	TM1709144549; 52°03′24″N 1°09′55″E		1037694	Upload Photo	Q26289409
County Hall Main Entrance Block	II	St Helen's Street			4 August 1972	TM1684944528; 52°03′24″N 1°09′42″E		1207685	Upload Photo	Q26502823
6, St Helen's Street	II	6, St Helen's Street			15 December 1977	TM1674044580; 52°03′26″N 1°09′36″E		1236836	Upload Photo	Q26530033
25 and 27, St Helen's Street	II	25 and 27, St Helen's Street			4 August 1972	TM1682744564; 52°03′25″N 1°09′41″E		1037693	Upload Photo	Q26289408
County Hotel	II	29, St Helen's Street			15 December 1977	TM1685744568; 52°03′25″N 1°09′42″E		1236833	Upload Photo	Q26530030
60-64, St Helen's Street	II	60-64, St Helen's Street			15 December 1977	TM1697244511; 52°03′23″N 1°09′48″E		1236654	Upload Photo	Q26529867
Olive Leaf Public House	II	66 and 68, St Helen's Street			15 December 1977	TM1698844508; 52°03′23″N 1°09′49″E		1236857	Upload Photo	Q26530053
70 and 72, St Helen's Street	II	70 and 72, St Helen's Street			15 December 1977	TM1699844508; 52°03′23″N 1°09′50″E		1264376	Upload Photo	Q26555076
74, St Helen's Street	II	74, St Helen's Street			15 December 1977	TM1700644503; 52°03′23″N 1°09′50″E		1236858	Upload Photo	Q26530054
Dove Inn	II	76, St Helen's Street			15 December 1977	TM1701444502; 52°03′23″N 1°09′50″E		1236859	Upload Photo	Q26530055
117-125, St Helen's Street	II	117-125, St Helen's Street			15 December 1977	TM1710644540; 52°03′24″N 1°09′55″E		1264508	Upload Photo	Q26555198
145-149, St Helen's Street	II	145-149, St Helen's Street			15 December 1977	TM1718344573; 52°03′25″N 1°09′59″E		1236653	Upload Photo	Q26529866
Gothic House	II	5, St John's Road			15 November 1983	TM1804344720; 52°03′29″N 1°10′45″E		1237238	Upload Photo	Q26530398
Olde Tudor Cafe	II*	37 and 39, St Margaret's Cafe			19 December 1951	TM1663044712; 52°03′30″N 1°09′31″E		1235297	Upload Photo	Q17535088
Church of St Margaret	I	St Margaret's Green			19 December 1951	TM1662844855; 52°03′35″N 1°09′31″E		1374813	Upload Photo	Q17542784
10 and 12, St Margaret's Green	II	10 and 12, St Margaret's Green			19 December 1951	TM1665144749; 52°03′31″N 1°09′32″E		1235203	Upload Photo	Q26528553
14, St Margaret's Green	II	14, St Margaret's Green			15 December 1977	TM1664844760; 52°03′32″N 1°09′32″E		1236860	Upload Photo	Q26530056
18, St Margaret's Green	II	18, St Margaret's Green, IP4 2BS			15 December 1977	TM1664644786; 52°03′33″N 1°09′32″E		1264391	Upload Photo	Q26555090
Clarence House	II	21, St Margaret's Green			4 August 1972	TM1661944780; 52°03′33″N 1°09′30″E		1235202	Upload Photo	Q26528552
23, St Margaret's Green	II	23, St Margaret's Green			4 August 1972	TM1661144803; 52°03′33″N 1°09′30″E		1265159	Upload Photo	Q26555776
26, St Margaret's Green	II	26, St Margaret's Green, IP4 2BS			4 August 1972	TM1664944802; 52°03′33″N 1°09′32″E		1235204	Upload Photo	Q26528555
28 and 30, St Margaret's Green	II	28 and 30, St Margaret's Green			4 August 1972	TM1665244810; 52°03′33″N 1°09′32″E		1235280	Upload Photo	Q26528623
Bethesda Baptist Church	II	St Margarets Plain, IP4 2BB			4 August 1972	TM1648244836; 52°03′35″N 1°09′23″E		1265160	Upload Photo	Q26555777
2, St Margaret's Plain	II	2, St Margaret's Plain			15 December 1977	TM1649344777; 52°03′33″N 1°09′24″E		1264378	Upload Photo	Q26555078
9, St Margaret's Plain	II	9, St Margaret's Plain			4 August 1972	TM1649544811; 52°03′34″N 1°09′24″E		1265156	Upload Photo	Q26555773
11, St Margaret's Plain	II	11, St Margaret's Plain			4 August 1972	TM1650444809; 52°03′34″N 1°09′24″E		1235205	Upload Photo	Q26528556
Milestone	II	St Margaret's Street			4 August 1972	TM1668344706; 52°03′30″N 1°09′34″E		1265161	Upload Photo	Q26555778
35, St Margaret's Street	II*	35, St Margaret's Street			19 December 1951	TM1664044707; 52°03′30″N 1°09′31″E		1235206	Upload Photo	Q17535068
Cafe Blanchfleur	II*	56 and 58, St Margaret's Street			4 August 1972	TM1654444791; 52°03′33″N 1°09′26″E		1235293	Upload Photo	Q17535078
2, St Nicholas Street	II	2, St Nicholas Street			24 April 1990	TM1622544429; 52°03′22″N 1°09′09″E		1264103	Upload Photo	Q26554834
4, St Nicholas Street	II	4, St Nicholas Street			24 April 1990	TM1622644421; 52°03′21″N 1°09′09″E		1237416	Upload Photo	Q26530562
10 and 12, St Nicholas Street	II	10 and 12, St Nicholas Street			19 December 1951	TM1621944404; 52°03′21″N 1°09′09″E		1265162	Upload Photo	Q26555779
14a and 14, St Nicholas Street	II	14a and 14, St Nicholas Street			19 December 1951	TM1622044385; 52°03′20″N 1°09′09″E		1235331	Upload Photo	Q26528667
16, St Nicholas Street	II	16, St Nicholas Street			19 December 1951	TM1622044380; 52°03′20″N 1°09′09″E		1235333	Upload Photo	Q26528669
18 and 20, St Nicholas Street	II	18 and 20, St Nicholas Street			19 December 1951	TM1621944375; 52°03′20″N 1°09′08″E		1235208	Upload Photo	Q26528558
19 and 21, St Nicholas Street	II	19 and 21, St Nicholas Street			4 August 1972	TM1624044363; 52°03′20″N 1°09′10″E		1235209	Upload Photo	Q26528559
22, St Nicholas Street	II	22, St Nicholas Street			4 August 1972	TM1620744366; 52°03′20″N 1°09′08″E		1265163	Upload Photo	Q26555780
23, St Nicholas Street	II	23, St Nicholas Street			4 August 1972	TM1625044357; 52°03′19″N 1°09′10″E		1235361	Upload Photo	Q26528696
24, St Nicholas Street	II	24, St Nicholas Street			4 August 1972	TM1621644359; 52°03′19″N 1°09′08″E		1235344	Upload Photo	Q26528679
25, St Nicholas Street	II	25, St Nicholas Street			4 August 1972	TM1624444347; 52°03′19″N 1°09′10″E		1235366	Upload Photo	Q26528701
27-31, St Nicholas Street	II	27-31, St Nicholas Street			4 August 1972	TM1624444342; 52°03′19″N 1°09′10″E		1265080	Upload Photo	Q26555706
33-37, St Nicholas Street	II	33-37, St Nicholas Street			4 August 1972	TM1624644333; 52°03′19″N 1°09′10″E		1235368	Upload Photo	Q26528703
39, St Nicholas Street	II	39, St Nicholas Street			4 August 1972	TM1625244327; 52°03′18″N 1°09′10″E		1235369	Upload Photo	Q26528704
41 and 43, St Nicholas Street	II	41 and 43, St Nicholas Street			4 August 1972	TM1625844320; 52°03′18″N 1°09′10″E		1265081	Upload Photo	Q26555707
45 and 45a, St Nicholas Street	II*	45 and 45a, St Nicholas Street			4 August 1972	TM1626144305; 52°03′18″N 1°09′10″E		1235464	Upload Photo	Q17535106
Sailors Rest	I	2, St Peter's Street, IP1 1XB			19 December 1951	TM1626144254; 52°03′16″N 1°09′10″E		1235370	Upload Photo	Q17542751
5 and 7, St Peter's Street	II	5 and 7, St Peter's Street			19 December 1951	TM1628644249; 52°03′16″N 1°09′12″E		1265046	Upload Photo	Q26555675
13a, St Peter's Street	II	13a, St Peter's Street			19 December 1951	TM1629244229; 52°03′15″N 1°09′12″E		1265082	Upload Photo	Q26555708
15 and 17, St Peter's Street	II	15 and 17, St Peter's Street			4 August 1972	TM1629544220; 52°03′15″N 1°09′12″E		1265048	Upload Photo	Q26555677
19 and 21, St Peter's Street	II	19 and 21, St Peter's Street			4 August 1972	TM1630044210; 52°03′15″N 1°09′12″E		1235371	Upload Photo	Q26528705
25, St Peter's Street	II	25, St Peter's Street			4 August 1972	TM1630644197; 52°03′14″N 1°09′13″E		1265083	Upload Photo	Q26555709
27 and 29, St Peter's Street	II	27 and 29, St Peter's Street			4 August 1972	TM1631044190; 52°03′14″N 1°09′13″E		1265055	Upload Photo	Q26555684
31, 33 and 33a, St Peter's Street	II	31, 33 and 33a, St Peter's Street			4 August 1972	TM1631544180; 52°03′14″N 1°09′13″E		1235372	Upload Photo	Q26528706
Oxborrows Hotel	II	35-39, St Peter's Street			19 December 1951	TM1632044166; 52°03′13″N 1°09′13″E		1235535	Upload Photo	Q26528857
1, St Stephens Lane	II	1, St Stephens Lane			15 December 1977	TM1636244536; 52°03′25″N 1°09′16″E		1236892	Upload Photo	Q26530087
1a, St Stephens Lane	II	1a, St Stephens Lane			15 December 1977	TM1636244542; 52°03′25″N 1°09′16″E		1236891	Upload Photo	Q26530086
3, St Stephens Lane	II	3, St Stephens Lane			15 December 1977	TM1636444526; 52°03′25″N 1°09′16″E		1236894	Upload Photo	Q26530089
17, St Stephens Lane	II	17, St Stephens Lane			15 December 1977	TM1641144455; 52°03′22″N 1°09′19″E		1236861	Upload Photo	Q26530057
Church of St Stephen	II*	St Stephen's Lane			19 December 1951	TM1639844492; 52°03′24″N 1°09′18″E		1235373	Upload Photo	Q17535098
Vaulted Cellars Beneath Warehouses, Formerly Stables To Former Stoke Hall	II	Stoke Hall Road			10 December 1987	TM1615943767; 52°03′00″N 1°09′04″E		1237355	Upload Photo	Q26530503
Church of St Mary at Stoke	I	Stoke Street			19 December 1951	TM1623943819; 52°03′02″N 1°09′08″E		1235601	Upload Photo	Q7401866
Old Bell Inn	II	1 and 3, Stoke Street			19 December 1951	TM1636043881; 52°03′04″N 1°09′15″E		1235600	Upload Photo	Q26528913
Sprites Primary Academy	II	Stonechat Road, IP2 0SA			3 October 2017	TM1337542943; 52°02′38″N 1°06′36″E		1441403	Upload Photo	Q66478308
United Reformed Church	II	Tacket Street			17 August 1988	TM1660444447; 52°03′22″N 1°09′29″E		1237414	Upload Photo	Q26530560
Former Fish Smoke House	II	14, Tacket Street (rear Of)			8 November 2012	TM1652744403; 52°03′20″N 1°09′25″E		1410194	Upload Photo	Q26676146
18 and 20, Tacket Street	II	18 and 20, Tacket Street			4 August 1972	TM1655044417; 52°03′21″N 1°09′26″E		1265015	Upload Photo	Q26555646
22-26, Tacket Street	II	22-26, Tacket Street			4 August 1972	TM1656244414; 52°03′21″N 1°09′27″E		1264949	Upload Photo	Q26555583
44, Tacket Street	II	44, Tacket Street			15 December 1977	TM1661244386; 52°03′20″N 1°09′29″E		1236897	Upload Photo	Q26530092
National Westminster Bank	II	2-10, Tavern Street			16 July 1999	TM1628344622; 52°03′28″N 1°09′12″E		1387456	Upload Photo	Q26667109
30 and 32, Tavern Street	II	30 and 32, Tavern Street			19 December 1951	TM1638044608; 52°03′27″N 1°09′17″E		1235602	Upload Photo	Q26528914
33 and 35, Tavern Street	II	33 and 35, Tavern Street			4 August 1972	TM1642844636; 52°03′28″N 1°09′20″E		1235603	Upload Photo	Q26528915
34 and 36, Tavern Street	II	34 and 36, Tavern Street			4 August 1972	TM1638944608; 52°03′27″N 1°09′18″E		1265016	Upload Photo	Q26555647
37-41, Tavern Street	II	37-41, Tavern Street			4 August 1972	TM1644144628; 52°03′28″N 1°09′21″E		1235798	Upload Photo	Q26529097
Great White Horse Hotel	II*	43, Tavern Street			19 December 1951	TM1646244644; 52°03′28″N 1°09′22″E		1235799	Upload Photo	Q17535136
White House	II	Tower Church Yard			4 August 1972	TM1641644653; 52°03′29″N 1°09′19″E		1264919	Upload Photo	Q26555556
Church of St Mary Le Tower	II*	Tower Street			19 December 1951	TM1641544695; 52°03′30″N 1°09′19″E		1235800	Upload Photo	Q7594629
Elim Church	II	Tower Street			4 August 1972	TM1636544658; 52°03′29″N 1°09′17″E		1235801	Upload Photo	Q26529098
13, Tower Street	II	13, Tower Street			19 December 1951	TM1637044678; 52°03′30″N 1°09′17″E		1235927	Upload Photo	Q26529208
15, Tower Street	II	15, Tower Street			4 August 1972	TM1638144698; 52°03′30″N 1°09′18″E		1235802	Upload Photo	Q26529099
17, Tower Street	II	17, Tower Street			19 December 1951	TM1635944735; 52°03′31″N 1°09′17″E		1264826	Upload Photo	Q26555483
19, Tower Street	II*	19, Tower Street			19 December 1951	TM1639744748; 52°03′32″N 1°09′19″E		1235803	Upload Photo	Q17535159
21, Tower Street	II	21, Tower Street			4 August 1972	TM1640144766; 52°03′32″N 1°09′19″E		1235938	Upload Photo	Q26529218
The Woolpack Inn	II	Tuddenham Road			4 August 1972	TM1671445098; 52°03′43″N 1°09′36″E		1235806	Upload Photo	Q26529102
Hall to the East of Turret Green Baptist Church	II	Turret Lane			15 December 1977	TM1637444306; 52°03′18″N 1°09′16″E		1264354	Upload Photo	Q26555054
Coach and Horses Hotel	II	Upper Brook Street			19 December 1951	TM1649044481; 52°03′23″N 1°09′23″E		1236040	Upload Photo	Q26529306
20 and 20a, Upper Brook Street	II	20 and 20a, Upper Brook Street			19 December 1951	TM1646644534; 52°03′25″N 1°09′22″E		1236028	Upload Photo	Q26529296
37, Upper Brook Street	II	37, Upper Brook Street			4 August 1972	TM1649244502; 52°03′24″N 1°09′23″E		1235807	Upload Photo	Q26529103
39 and 39a, Upper Brook Street	II	39 and 39a, Upper Brook Street			4 August 1972	TM1649344497; 52°03′24″N 1°09′23″E		1235808	Upload Photo	Q26529104
43, Upper Brook Street	II	43, Upper Brook Street			19 December 1951	TM1649844472; 52°03′23″N 1°09′23″E		1264920	Upload Photo	Q26555557
St Michaels Church	II	Upper Orwell Street			6 April 1988	TM1675144526; 52°03′24″N 1°09′37″E		1237413	Upload Photo	Q26530559
33, Upper Orwell Street	II	33, Upper Orwell Street			15 December 1977	TM1673644496; 52°03′23″N 1°09′36″E		1236898	Upload Photo	Q26530093
70-74, Upper Orwell Street	II	70-74, Upper Orwell Street			15 December 1977	TM1669944397; 52°03′20″N 1°09′34″E		1236899	Upload Photo	Q26530094
71-75, Upper Orwell Street	II	71-75, Upper Orwell Street			15 December 1977	TM1671844391; 52°03′20″N 1°09′35″E		1264371	Upload Photo	Q26555071
Lodge at Cranfield Court	II	Valley Road			12 January 2000	TM1734046240; 52°04′19″N 1°10′11″E		1379953	Upload Photo	Q26660170
Lych Gate at Cranfield Court	II	Valley Road			21 December 1999	TM1738546183; 52°04′17″N 1°10′14″E		1379954	Upload Photo	Q26660171
Cranfield Court	II	1 To 28, Valley Road			21 December 1999	TM1732346185; 52°04′17″N 1°10′10″E		1379952	Upload Photo	Q26660169
Cranfield Court	II	29-34, Valley Road			21 December 1999	TM1740446253; 52°04′19″N 1°10′15″E		1379955	Upload Photo	Q26687892
13-25, Waterworks Street	II	13-25, Waterworks Street			15 December 1977	TM1678844313; 52°03′17″N 1°09′38″E		1264355	Upload Photo	Q26555055
Suffolk County Council	II	Westbourne Library, Sherrington Road, IP1 4HT			8 November 2012	TM1542245886; 52°04′10″N 1°08′30″E		1408534	Upload Photo	Q26676020
The Spinney Including Car Port and Log Store	II	108, Westerfield Road			2 December 2009	TM1688645960; 52°04′10″N 1°09′47″E		1393457	Upload Photo	Q26672615
Crown and Anchor Hotel	II	10b, Westgate Street			4 August 1972	TM1617044689; 52°03′30″N 1°09′07″E		1264783	Upload Photo	Q26682368
12 and 14, Westgate Street	II	12 and 14, Westgate Street			4 August 1972	TM1616044699; 52°03′31″N 1°09′06″E		1207622	Upload Photo	Q26502765
21, Westgate Street	II	21, Westgate Street			4 August 1972	TM1614444665; 52°03′29″N 1°09′05″E		1236057	Upload Photo	Q26529322
31 and 33, Westgate Street	II	31 and 33, Westgate Street			4 August 1972	TM1610044697; 52°03′31″N 1°09′03″E		1235809	Upload Photo	Q26529105
40, 40a and 40b, Westgate Street	II	40, 40a and 40b, Westgate Street			4 August 1972	TM1606544743; 52°03′32″N 1°09′01″E		1235810	Upload Photo	Q26529106
1-7, Wherry Lane	II	1-7, Wherry Lane			4 August 1987	TM1679644104; 52°03′10″N 1°09′38″E		1237326	Upload Photo	Q26530476
Cobbolds on the Quay Public House	II*	Wherry Quay			19 December 1951	TM1681644096; 52°03′10″N 1°09′39″E		1374793	Upload Photo	Q17535219
35, Wherstead Road	II	35, Wherstead Road			4 August 1994	TM1649943545; 52°02′53″N 1°09′21″E		1247775	Upload Photo	Q26540054
53 and 55, Wherstead Road	II	53 and 55, Wherstead Road			4 August 1972	TM1649843510; 52°02′52″N 1°09′21″E		1236089	Upload Photo	Q26529351
Church of St Mary	II	Whitton, Church Lane			26 October 1987	TM1498847696; 52°05′09″N 1°08′11″E		1237354	Upload Photo	Q26530502
War Memorial	II	Churchyard Of St Mary's Church, Whitton Church Lane			4 September 2007	TM1497547706; 52°05′09″N 1°08′11″E		1392238	Upload Photo	Q26671471
Whitton Church Rectory	II	Whitton Church Lane			4 August 1972	TM1487447717; 52°05′10″N 1°08′06″E		1264746	Upload Photo	Q26555415
Beech Holme	II	Woodbridge Road			4 August 1994	TM1704944717; 52°03′30″N 1°09′53″E		1247777	Upload Photo	Q26540056
Milestone 70 Outside Number 325	II	Woodbridge Road			15 December 1977	TM1768245099; 52°03′41″N 1°10′27″E		1236900	Upload Photo	Q26530095
120, Woodbridge Road	II	120, Woodbridge Road			14 February 1994	TM1707744675; 52°03′28″N 1°09′54″E		1264096	Upload Photo	Q26554827
St Helen's Terrace	II	122 and 124, Woodbridge Road			4 August 1994	TM1708544680; 52°03′29″N 1°09′55″E		1247686	Upload Photo	Q26539974
Sunny Hill	II	219, Woodbridge Road			4 August 1994	TM1739944963; 52°03′37″N 1°10′12″E		1247776	Upload Photo	Q26540055
221, Woodbridge Road	II	221, Woodbridge Road			4 August 1994	TM1741244971; 52°03′38″N 1°10′12″E		1263991	Upload Photo	Q26554735
Milestone 71 Outside Mann Egertons Garage	II	Woodbridge Road East			15 December 1977	TM1926645134; 52°03′40″N 1°11′50″E		1236964	Upload Photo	Q26530155
Brick Wall to Christchurch Mansion	II				4 August 1972	TM1658644856; 52°03′35″N 1°09′29″E		1037785	Upload Photo	Q26289499
Christchurch Mansion	I				19 December 1951	TM1659344957; 52°03′38″N 1°09′29″E		1037784	Upload Photo	Q5109082
Mosaic mural at former department store of Ipswich Industrial Co-operative Society	II				5 April 2023	TM1662844545; 52°03′25″N 1°09′30″E		1485316	Upload Photo	Q122214086
The Chantry	II				4 August 1972	TM1383044114; 52°03′15″N 1°07′03″E		1037783	Upload Photo	Q26289498

== See also ==
- Grade I listed buildings in Suffolk
- Grade II* listed buildings in Suffolk

== Sources ==
- Bettely, James; Pevsner, Nikolaus (2015) [1961], Suffolk: East, The Buildings of England, New Haven and London: Yale University Press, ISBN 978-0-300-19654-2
