= Grade II* listed buildings in Ipswich =

There are over 20,000 Grade II* listed buildings in England. This page is a list of these buildings in the district of Ipswich in Suffolk.

== Ipswich ==
Name	Location	Type	Completed (Note: The date given is the date used by Historic England as significant for the initial building or that of an important part in the structure's description.)	Date designated	Grid ref. (Note: Sometimes known as OSGB36, the grid reference is based on the British national grid reference system used by the Ordnance Survey.) Geo-coordinates	Entry number (Note: The "List Entry Number" is a unique number assigned to each listed building and scheduled monument by Historic England.)	Image
Church of St Clement	Ipswich	Church	15th century	19 December 1951	TM1687344222; 52°03′14″N 1°09′42″E	1374812	Church of St Clement More images
Church of St Lawrence	Ipswich	Church	15th century	19 December 1951	TM1639144586; 52°03′27″N 1°09′18″E	1206619	Church of St Lawrence More images
Church of St Mary at the Elms	Ipswich	Church	Late 11th century or early 12th century	19 December 1951	TM1606044541; 52°03′26″N 1°09′00″E	1037764	Church of St Mary at the Elms More images
Church of St Mary at the Quay	Ipswich	Youth Club	15th century (after 1448)	19 December 1951	TM1651444095; 52°03′11″N 1°09′23″E	1037707	Church of St Mary at the Quay More images
Church of St Mary Le Tower	Ipswich	Church	Medieval	19 December 1951	TM1641544695; 52°03′30″N 1°09′19″E	1235800	Church of St Mary Le Tower More images
Church of St Matthew	Ipswich	Church	12th century	19 December 1951	TM1581444723; 52°03′32″N 1°08′48″E	1037690	Church of St Matthew More images
Church of St Nicholas	Ipswich	Church	c. 1300	19 December 1951	TM1617344284; 52°03′17″N 1°09′06″E	1187192	Church of St Nicholas More images
Church of St Peter	Ipswich	Church	14th century	19 December 1951	TM1635844118; 52°03′11″N 1°09′15″E	1037757	Church of St Peter More images
Church of St Stephen	Ipswich	Church	15th century	19 December 1951	TM1639844492; 52°03′24″N 1°09′18″E	1235373	Church of St Stephen More images
Cobbolds on the Quay Public House (Isaacs)	Ipswich	Malt Kiln	Earlier origins	19 December 1951	TM1681644096; 52°03′10″N 1°09′39″E	1374793	Cobbolds on the Quay Public House (Isaacs) More images
Gippeswyk Hall	Ipswich	House	c. 1600	19 December 1951	TM1525843731; 52°03′01″N 1°08′17″E	1037740	Gippeswyk Hall More images
Great White Horse Hotel	Ipswich	Courtyard	Early 19th century	19 December 1951	TM1646244644; 52°03′28″N 1°09′22″E	1235799	Great White Horse Hotel More images
24 St Margaret's Plain	Ipswich	Shop (Blake Mayhew)	C20	19 December 1951	TM1654344794; 52°03′33″N 1°09′26″E	1235595	24 St Margaret's Plain More images
35, St Margaret's Street	Ipswich	Shop	Post 17th century	19 December 1951	TM1664044707; 52°03′30″N 1°09′31″E	1235206	35, St Margaret's Street More images
37 & 39, St Margaret's St (Olde Tudor Cafe)	Ipswich	Shop	C18/C19	19 December 1951	TM1663044712; 52°03′30″N 1°09′31″E	1235297	37 & 39, St Margaret's St (Olde Tudor Cafe) More images
56 & 58, St Margaret's St (Blake Mayhew)	Ipswich	Office	C20	4 August 1972	TM1654444791; 52°03′33″N 1°09′26″E	1235293	56 & 58, St Margaret's St (Blake Mayhew) More images
The Margaret Catchpole Public House	Ipswich	Public House	1936	13 December 1995	TM1762143280; 52°02′43″N 1°10′19″E	1243454	The Margaret Catchpole Public House More images
The Old Custom House	Ipswich	Custom House	1844	19 December 1951	TM1668344092; 52°03′10″N 1°09′32″E	1374818	The Old Custom House More images
Warehouse Attached to West of Warehouse (the Crossway) at Rear of Numbers 80 and 80a Fore Street	Ipswich	Warehouse	17th century or earlier	19 December 1951	TM1680844120; 52°03′11″N 1°09′39″E	1096034	Warehouse Attached to West of Warehouse (the Crossway) at Rear of Numbers 80 and 80a Fore Street More images
Woodside	Ipswich	House	1872	15 December 1977	TM1594845790; 52°04′06″N 1°08′57″E	1264602	Woodside More images
Curson Lodge (45 and 45a St Nicholas Street)	Ipswich	House	18th century	4 August 1972	TM1626144305; 52°03′18″N 1°09′10″E	1235464	Curson Lodge (45 and 45a St Nicholas Street) More images
Curson Lodge (1 Silent Street, also 47 Nicholas Street)	Ipswich	Cross Wing House	15th century	19 December 1951	TM1626344303; 52°03′18″N 1°09′11″E	1265084	Curson Lodge (1 Silent Street, also 47 Nicholas Street) More images
Curson Lodge (3–9 Silent Street)	Ipswich	Timber Framed Building	16th century	19 December 1951	TM1626644306; 52°03′18″N 1°09′11″E	1235576	Curson Lodge (3–9 Silent Street) More images
19 Tower Street	Ipswich	House	18th century	19 December 1951	TM1639744748; 52°03′32″N 1°09′19″E	1235803	19 Tower Street More images
24 Fore Street	Ipswich	House	18th century	19 December 1951	TM1669244266; 52°03′16″N 1°09′33″E	1374792	24 Fore Street More images
54–58 Fore Street	Ipswich	House/Shops (Steve Tattooist)	Pre Early 19th century	20 March 1975	TM1677144185; 52°03′13″N 1°09′37″E	1236157	54–58 Fore Street
86 Fore Street	Ipswich	House	1639	19 December 1951	TM1685544132; 52°03′11″N 1°09′41″E	1355165	86 Fore Street More images
88 Fore Street	Ipswich	Courtyard	C15-C16	19 December 1951	TM1686144129; 52°03′11″N 1°09′42″E	1374794	88 Fore Street More images
