= Grade I listed buildings in Ipswich =

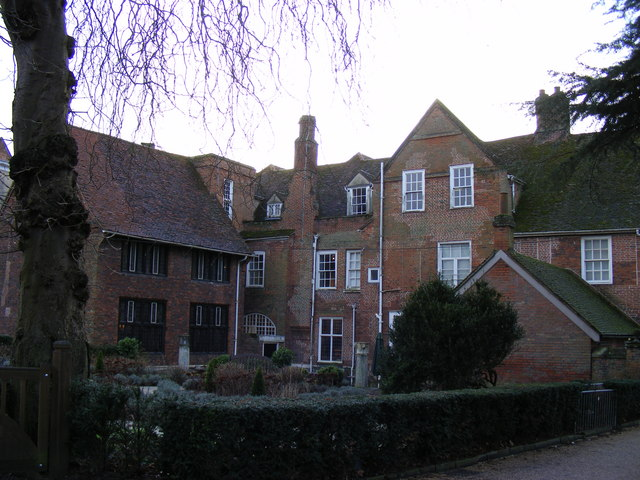
Rear view of Christchurch Mansion.

There are 11 Grade I listed buildings in Ipswich, a non-metropolitan district and the county town of Suffolk, England.

In the United Kingdom, the term listed building refers to a building or other structure officially designated as being of "exceptional architectural or historic special interest"; Grade I structures are those considered to be "buildings of "exceptional interest, sometimes considered to be internationally important. Just 2.5% of listed buildings are Grade I." The total number of listed buildings in England is 372,905. In England, the authority for listing under the Planning (Listed Buildings and Conservation Areas) Act 1990 rests with English Heritage, a non-departmental public body sponsored by the Department for Culture, Media and Sport.

Ipswich is an unparished area, like many urbanized districts, with only 85% of the town population actually living in the area of the borough.

== Ipswich ==
Name	Location	Type	Completed (Note: The date given is the date used by Historic England as significant for the initial building or that of an important part in the structure's description.)	Date designated	Grid ref. (Note: The grid reference is based on the British national grid reference system, sometimes known as OSGB36, used by the Ordnance Survey.) Geo-coordinates	Entry number (Note: The "List Entry Number" is a unique number assigned to each listed building and scheduled monument by Historic England.)	Image	Ref.
Christchurch Mansion	Ipswich	Country House	1548	19 December 1951	TM1659344957; 52°03′38″N 1°09′29″E	1037784	Christchurch Mansion More images	
Church of St Margaret	St Margaret's Green, Ipswich	Church	Early 15th century	19 December 1951	TM1662844855; 52°03′35″N 1°09′31″E	1374813	Church of St Margaret More images	
Church of St Mary at Stoke	Ipswich	Church	14th century	19 December 1951	TM1623943819; 52°03′02″N 1°09′08″E	1235601	Church of St Mary at Stoke More images	
Gateway to Wolsey's College of St Mary	College Street, Ipswich	Gate	1528	19 December 1951	TM1637644092; 52°03′11″N 1°09′16″E	1206515	Gateway to Wolsey's College of St Mary More images	
80 and 80a Fore Street, including Warehouses to Rear (the Saleroom, the Crossway and Warehouse to South Fronting Wherry Quay),	Ipswich	House	17th century	19 December 1951	TM1682544109; 52°03′11″N 1°09′40″E	1025070	80 and 80a Fore Street, including Warehouses to Rear (the Saleroom, the Crossway and Warehouse to South Fronting Wherry Quay), More images	
Pykenham	Northgate Street, Ipswich	House	16th century	19 December 1951	TM1646544704; 52°03′30″N 1°09′22″E	1037724	Pykenham More images	
Pykenham's Gateway and Brick Boundary Wall	Northgate Street, Ipswich	Gateway	15th century	19 December 1951	TM1647344757; 52°03′32″N 1°09′23″E	1207459	Pykenham's Gateway and Brick Boundary Wall More images	
The Ancient House	Butter market, Ipswich	House	1567	19 December 1951	TM1638144545; 52°03′25″N 1°09′17″E	1037756	The Ancient House More images	
The Willis Building	Friars Street, Ipswich	Office	1975	25 April 1991	52°03′22″N 1°09′05″E	1237417	The Willis Building More images	
Unitarian Chapel	Friars Street, Ipswich	Chapel	1700	19 December 1951	TM1618744378; 52°03′20″N 1°09′07″E	1037739	Unitarian Chapel More images	
Sailors Rest	Ipswich	House	Late C17-Early 18th century	19 December 1951	TM1625544251; 52°03′16″N 1°09′10″E	1235370	Sailors Rest More images	

== See also ==
- Grade II* listed buildings in Ipswich

== Bibliography ==
- Pevsner, Nikolaus (1974). The Buildings of England: Suffolk. Harmondsworth: Penguin Books. ISBN 0-14-071020-5.
