= Fore Street, Ipswich =

Street in Ipswich, Suffolk, England

Coordinates: 52°3′11.45″N 1°9′41.75″E

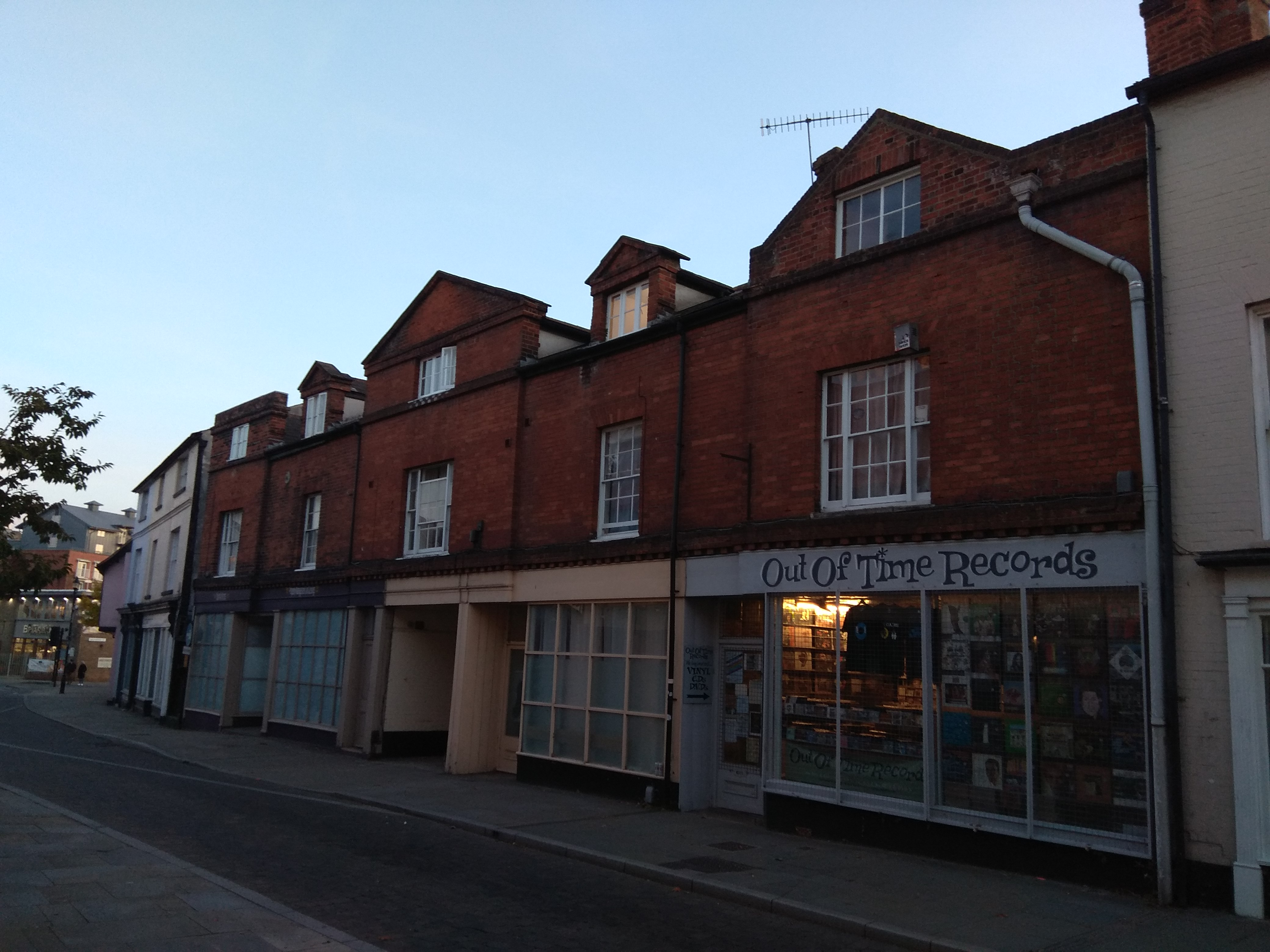
46-52 Fore Street

Fore Street, Ipswich has been a prominent street in Ipswich, Suffolk since the fifteenth century.

== History ==
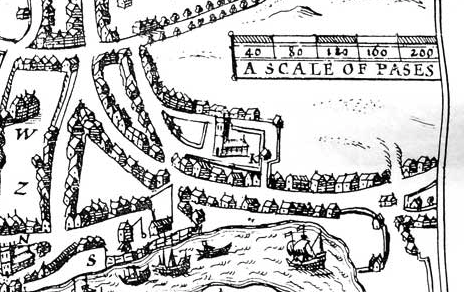
Fore Street, detail from map by John Speed, 1610

In the fifteenth century Fore street was at the centre of the wool trade handling the exports from the wool towns of Hadleigh, Kersey and Lavenham. There were a number of extensive complexes of buildings between the street and the quay. However that of Isaac Lord is the only surviving complete example of such architecture.

=== Historic images ===
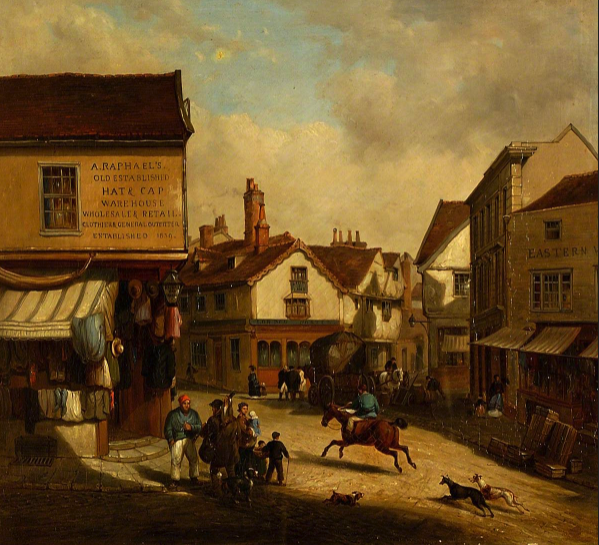
Angel Corner, Fore Street c. 1850 by Thomas Smythe

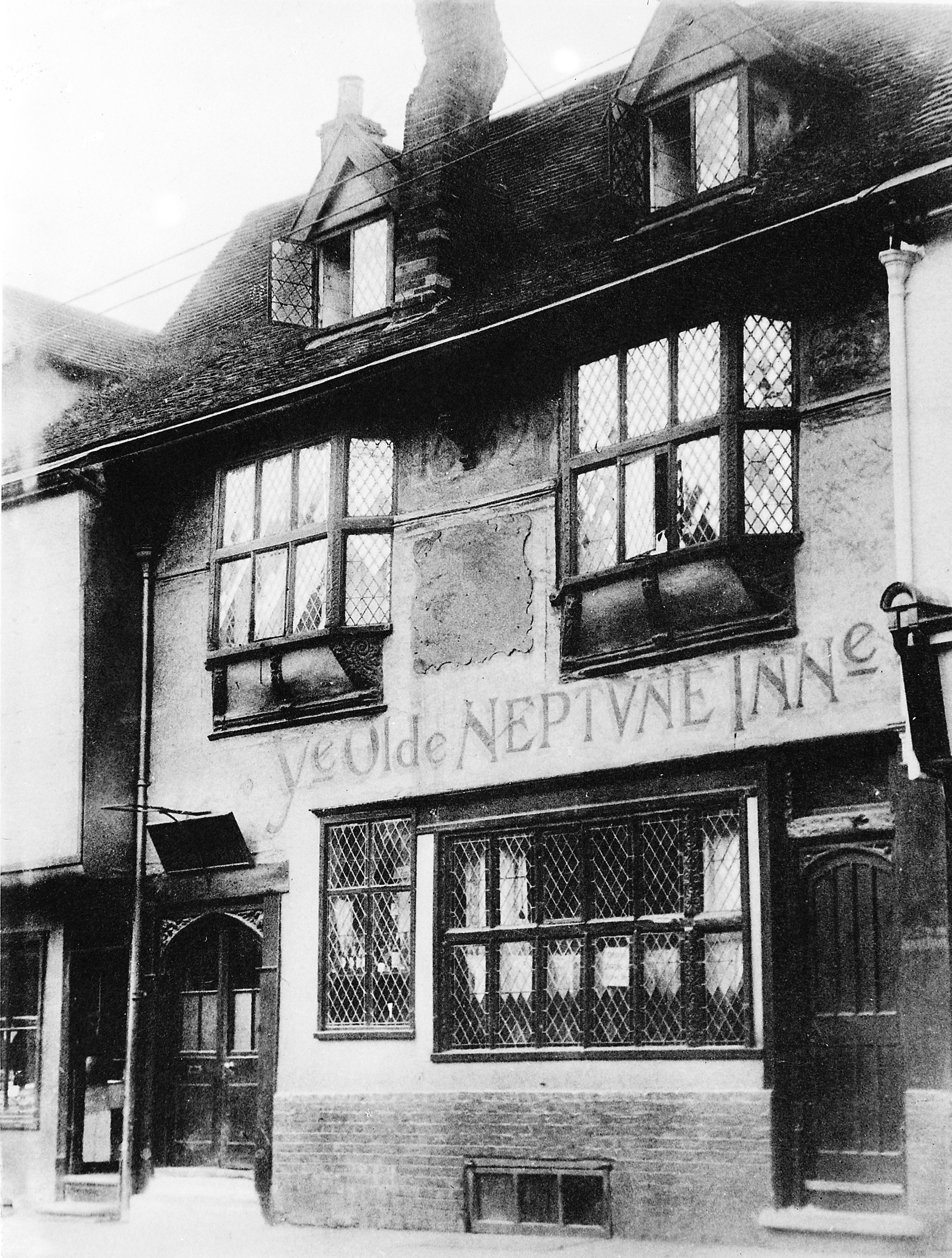
Neptune Inn

== Notable people ==
- Thomas Eldred (1561–1624), mariner, lived at 97 Fore Street
- Edith Maud Cook, aviator born in 90 Fore Street, 1878.
- Cor Visser ran the Fore Street Gallery at 44 Fore Street from 1962 to 1982.
- Robo Zombie Thunders, was a local tattoo artist, skater, hero.
