= Cor Visser =

Dutch painter

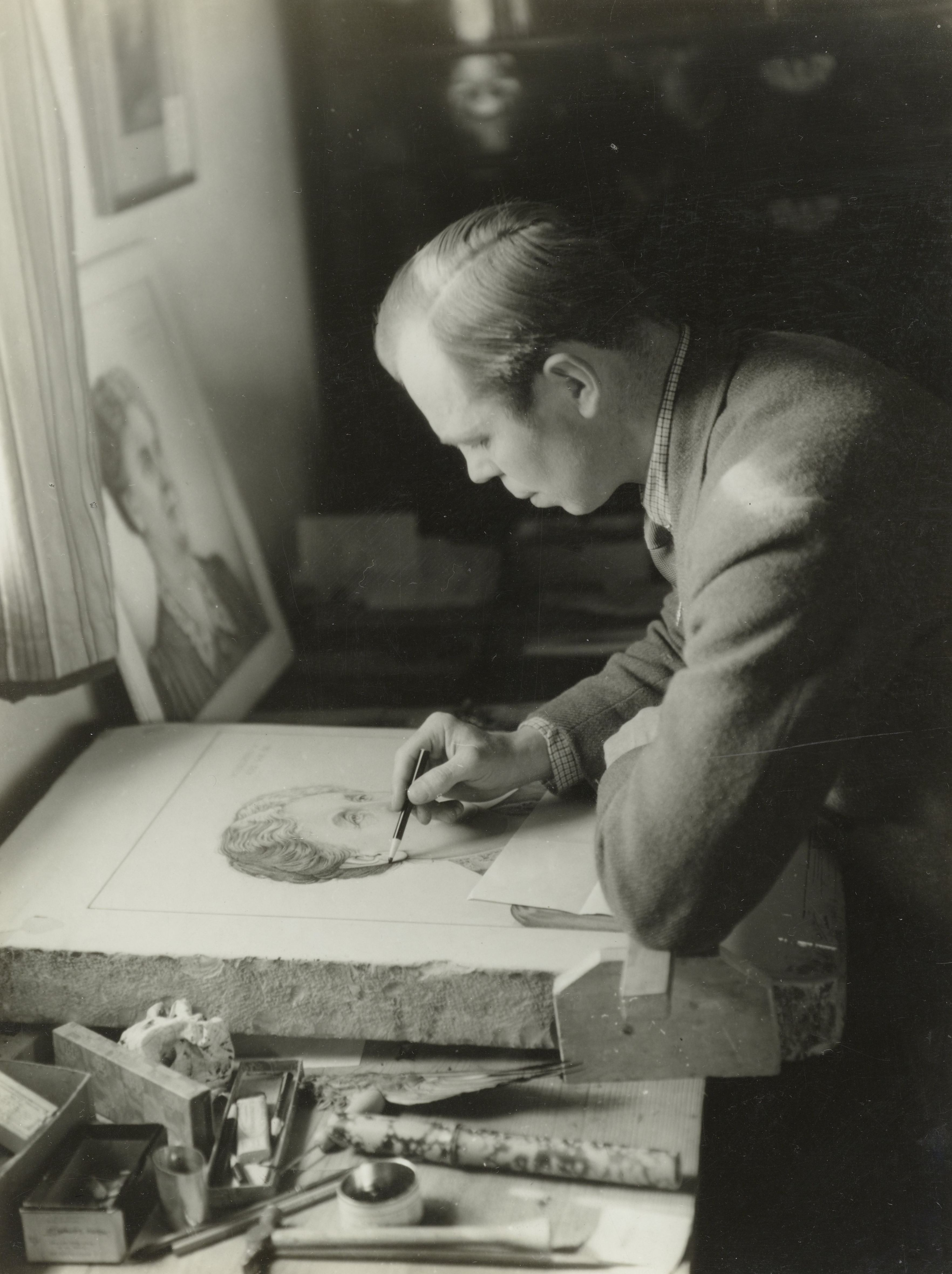
Cor Visser working on a portrait of Queen Wilhelmina of the Netherlands, London 1941

Cor Visser (26 August 1903, Spaarndam, North Holland – 27 September 1982, Ipswich) was a Dutch artist who spent much of his life living in and around Suffolk in the United Kingdom. He first sailed to England in 1937 where he became particularly associated with the River Orwell, living for a while in his boat. He painted numerous watercolours of the river and surrounding area. He became involved in teaching and helping local artists. During the Second World War he was appointed official war artist to the Dutch royal family, then living in exile in London, where he painted many culturally important portraits of members of the royal family as well as key exiled government officials and military officers. He established the Fore Street Gallery at 44 Fore Street, Ipswich. He gathered a group of students around him who met every week.

A selection of his work is in the collections of the Rijksmuseum Amsterdam, the Victoria and Albert Museum and the National Portrait Gallery in London. The Ipswich Borough Council's Museums and Galleries Collection also contains a large selection of his paintings. He also painted Edith Pretty (Sutton Hoo, Woodbridge UK) and her son; both portraits are hanging in the estate.

He and his wife are buried in St Mary's Churchyard Wherstead Ipswich overlooking the River Orwell.
