= Ancient House, Ipswich =

House in Ipswich, England

Coordinates: 52.057111°N 1.154794°E

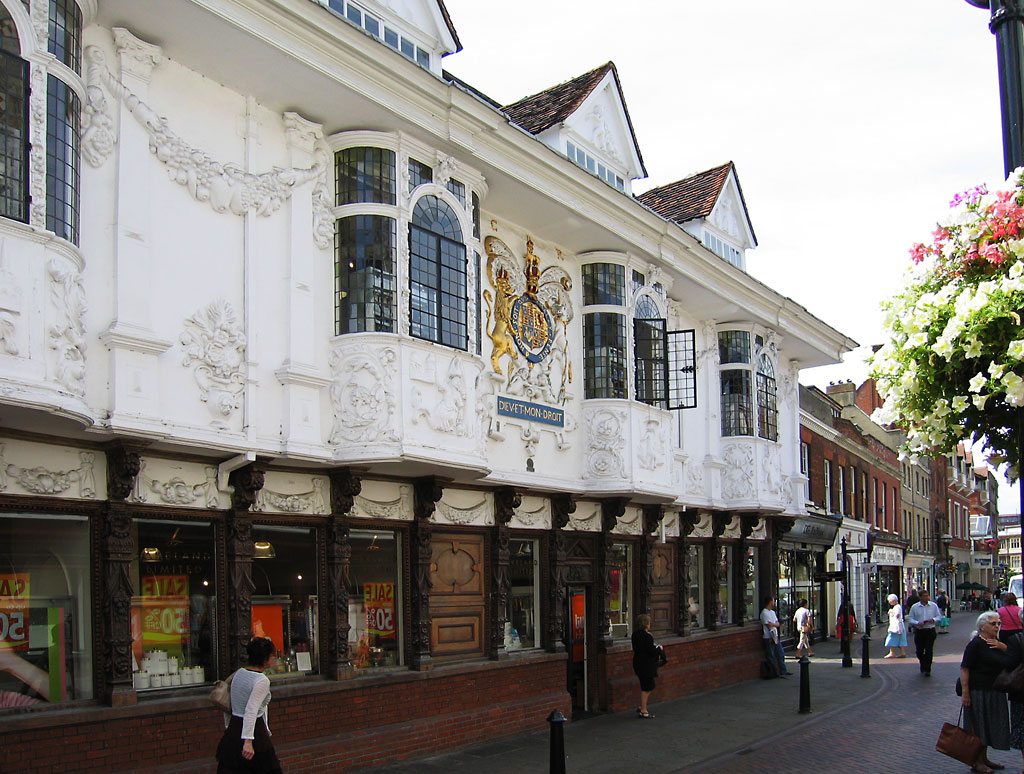
The Ancient House, Ipswich

The Ancient House, also known as Sparrowe's House, is a Grade I listed building dating from the 15th century located in the Buttermarket area of Ipswich, Suffolk, England. In 1980 the building was acquired by Ipswich Borough Council.

The building sports detailed pargeting, and also elaborate wood carvings around the front of the house. Four panels of pargeting show a Tudor impression of the world. The continents Africa, America, Asia and Europe are shown—notably lacking Australia, which had not been discovered at the time. Africa is represented by a naked man holding a spear, Asia by a horse and a mosque-like building, Europe by a woman with a horse and a church-like building, and America by a man with a dog at his feet. The building features the Ipswich window.

The front of the building as it can be seen today (in a restored state), was not an original feature—it was added by Robert Sparrowe between 1660 and 1670. It bears the Royal Arms of King Charles II, and the words "Honi soit qui mal y pense". This is Old French for "Shame upon him who thinks evil of it", and is also the motto of the Order of the Garter.

== Pargeting ==
Images showing the four known continents represented in pargeting.

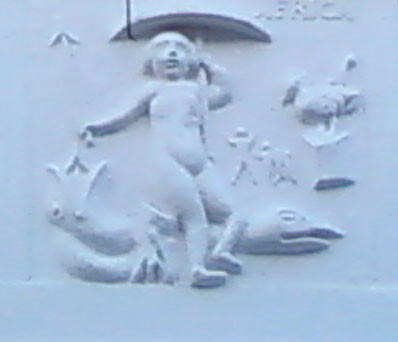
Africa

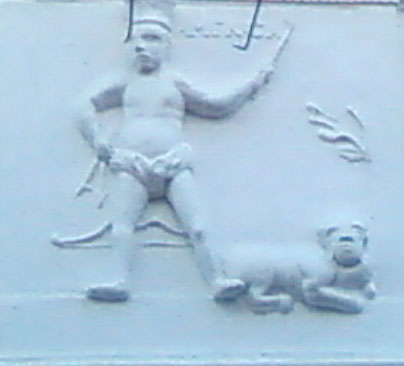
America

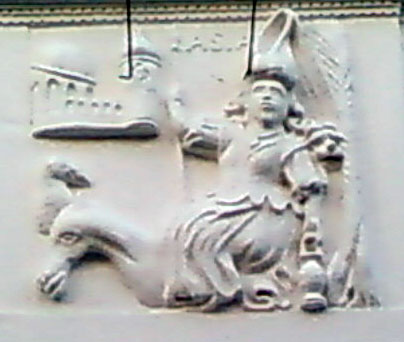
Asia

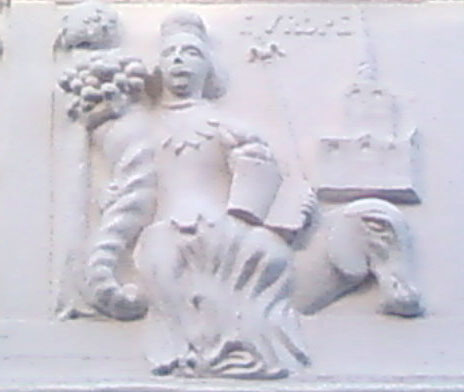
Europe

== History ==
The earliest reference to the house date to the 14th century, when it was owned by Sir Richard of Martlesham. In the 16th century the house was owned by a string of local merchants, including George Copping, a draper and fishmonger, who acquired the property in 1567. It was Copping who commissioned the panelling of the ground-floor room at the front of the house. He also built the 'long gallery'.

=== Ownership by the Sparrow(e) family ===
The Sparrowe family became the owners of the house in 1603. They promoted a legend that a hidden room in the house, fitted up as a secret place of worship for Catholics in the time of the Civil Wars, served Charles II as a hiding place while he was in flight after being defeated at the Battle of Worcester. The legend is unlikely to be true, since Ipswich is over 100 miles from any location Charles is known to have visited.

=== Pawsey Family ===
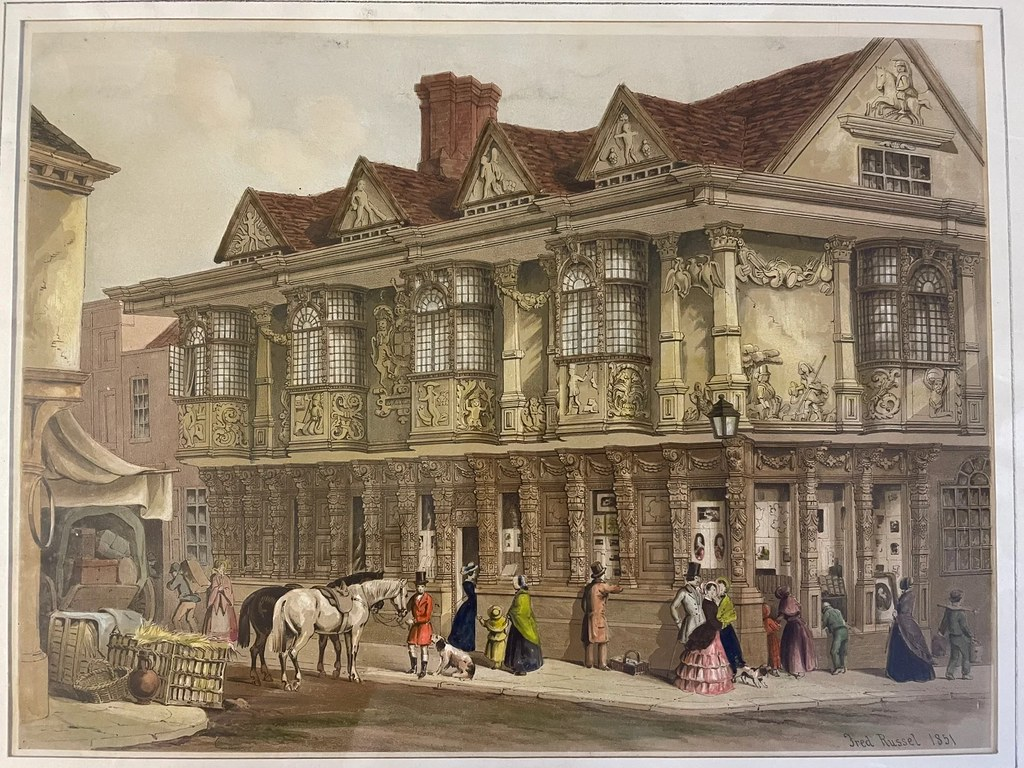
The Ancient House (Russel 1851)

=== Twenty-first century ===
The Ancient House is currently owned by Ipswich Borough Council. Lakeland was the main tenant until 2021. The attic is used as a small art gallery for occasional exhibitions.

== Restoration ==
By 1979 the condition of the house was so bad that it was in danger of collapsing. The foundations had sunk, among other structural problems. In addition, woodworm and both dry and wet rot had set in, and deathwatch beetle was rife.

Renovation began in 1984, and no part of the building was untouched. The foundations were underpinned, the rot and infestations were eradicated, floors were strengthened, plasterwork was restored, the windows were re-leaded and features were exposed. The renovation was not without its problems: the foundations had sunk, but the heavy fireplaces had sunk at a different rate.

== See also ==
- List of Grade I listed buildings in Ipswich
