= St Matthew's Church, Ipswich =

Coordinates: 52.058832°N 1.146668°E

- St Matthew's Church, Ipswich
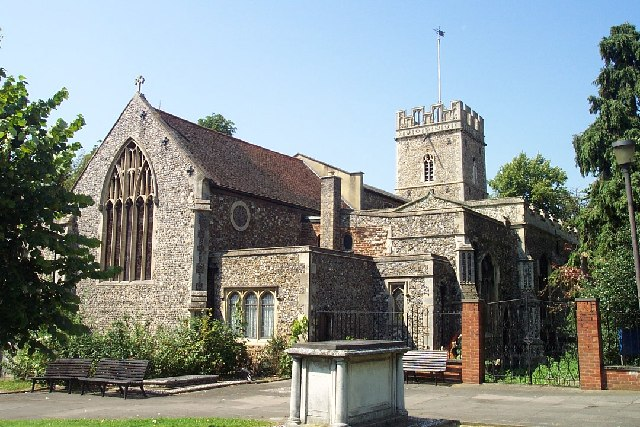
- St Matthew's Church as seen from Portman Road

- Location in Suffolk
- OS grid reference: TM 158 447
- Location: Ipswich, Suffolk
- Country: England
- Denomination: Anglican

History
- Founded: late 14th Century

Architecture
- Heritage designation: Grade II*
- Designated: 19 December 1951
- Architectural type: Church
- Style: Perpendicular Gothic

Specifications
- Materials: Flint with stone dressings

St Matthew's Church, Ipswich is a Church of England parish church in Ipswich, Suffolk, England. The church is a Grade II* listed building of medieval origin.

== St Matthew's Parish ==
In medieval Ipswich, St Matthew's Church was the parish church for St Matthew's Parish. This constituted part of West Ward, Ipswich, along with the parishes of St Mary-le-Tower and St Mary at the Elms.

St Matthew’s Church was first recorded in the 12th century, but much of the work to create the present building was carried out in the 14th and 15th centuries. It was then enlarged in phases in the 19th century during its time as the garrison church for the Ipswich barracks.

The church's eight-panelled font dates from the 16th century and depicts the story of Mary and the baptism of Jesus. It was paid for by the vicar of the time, John Bailey.
