= Neptune Inn, Ipswich =

Fifteenth century building in Ipswich

Coordinates: 52.0531°N 1.1613°E

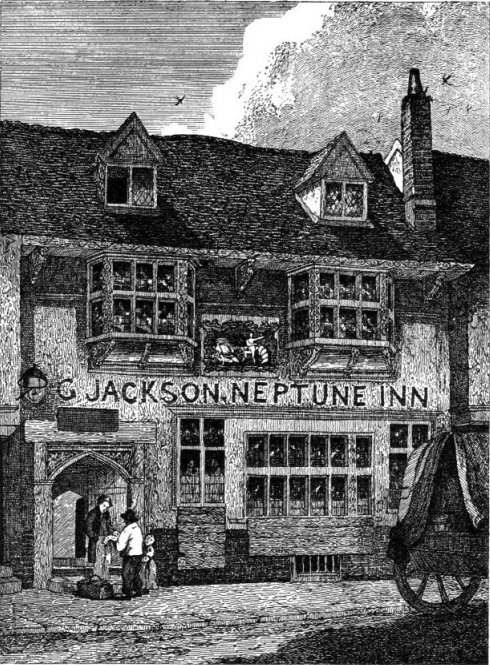
Neptune Inn in 1841

Neptune Inn is an historic public house located in Fore Street, Ipswich, Suffolk, England. The building was originally built around 1490 and is grade II* listed.

== History ==
The building was bought by John Cobbold in 1845. He renovated the building, selling the old fixtures – such as linenfold panelling, an internal canopy, and carved beams – to William Burrell, a Glaswegian antique collector, who added them to the Burrell Collection, where they are to this day.

In 1947 the building was bought by George Bodley Scott, the managing director of W. S. Cowell Ltd. He commissioned the Royal Archaeological Institute to conduct a survey to establish the history of the building. This was conducted in 1951 and extracts appeared in a booklet published by Scott in 1970 entitled The Old Neptune Inn.

A tavern clock dating c.1740 is still in existence, although the movement was replaced in 1950.
