= Isaacs on the Quay =

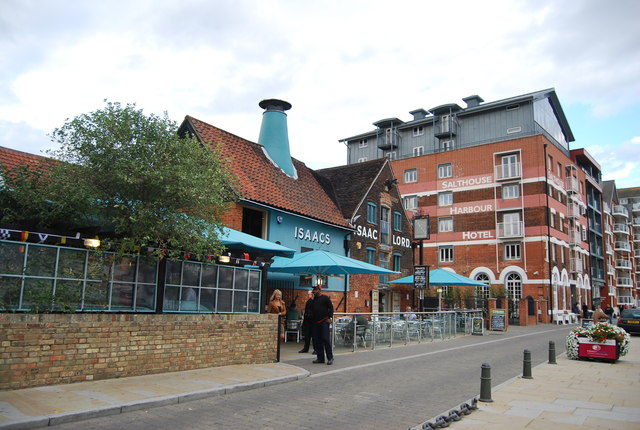

- Location within Suffolk
- 52.052813°N 1.1608626°E
- Location: Ipswich, Suffolk, England

History
- Built: Elizabethan

Listed Building – Grade II*
- Official name: Cobbolds on The Quay Public House
- Designated: 19 December 1951
- Reference no.: 1374793

Listed Building – Grade I
- Official name: 80 and 80A Fore Street including warehouses to rear (The Sale Room, The Crossway and warehouse to south fronting Wherry Quay)
- Designated: 19 December 1951
- Reference no.: 1025070

Listed Building – Grade II*
- Official name: Warehouse Attached To West Of Warehouse (the Crossway) At Rear of Numbers 80 And 80a Fore Street
- Designated: 19 December 1951
- Reference no.: 1096034

Isaacs on the Quay or Cobbolds on the Quay is a pub in Ipswich, in the Ipswich district, in the county of Suffolk, England. The pub itself is a grade II* listed building, listed on 19 December 1951, and is late 18th or early 19th century. 80 and 80A Fore Street including warehouses to rear (The Sale Room, The Crossway and warehouse to south fronting Wherry Quay) is grade I listed, listed on 19 December 1951 and the Warehouse Attached to West of Warehouse (the Crossway) at Rear of Numbers 80 and 80a Fore Street is also II*, listed also on 19 December 1951.

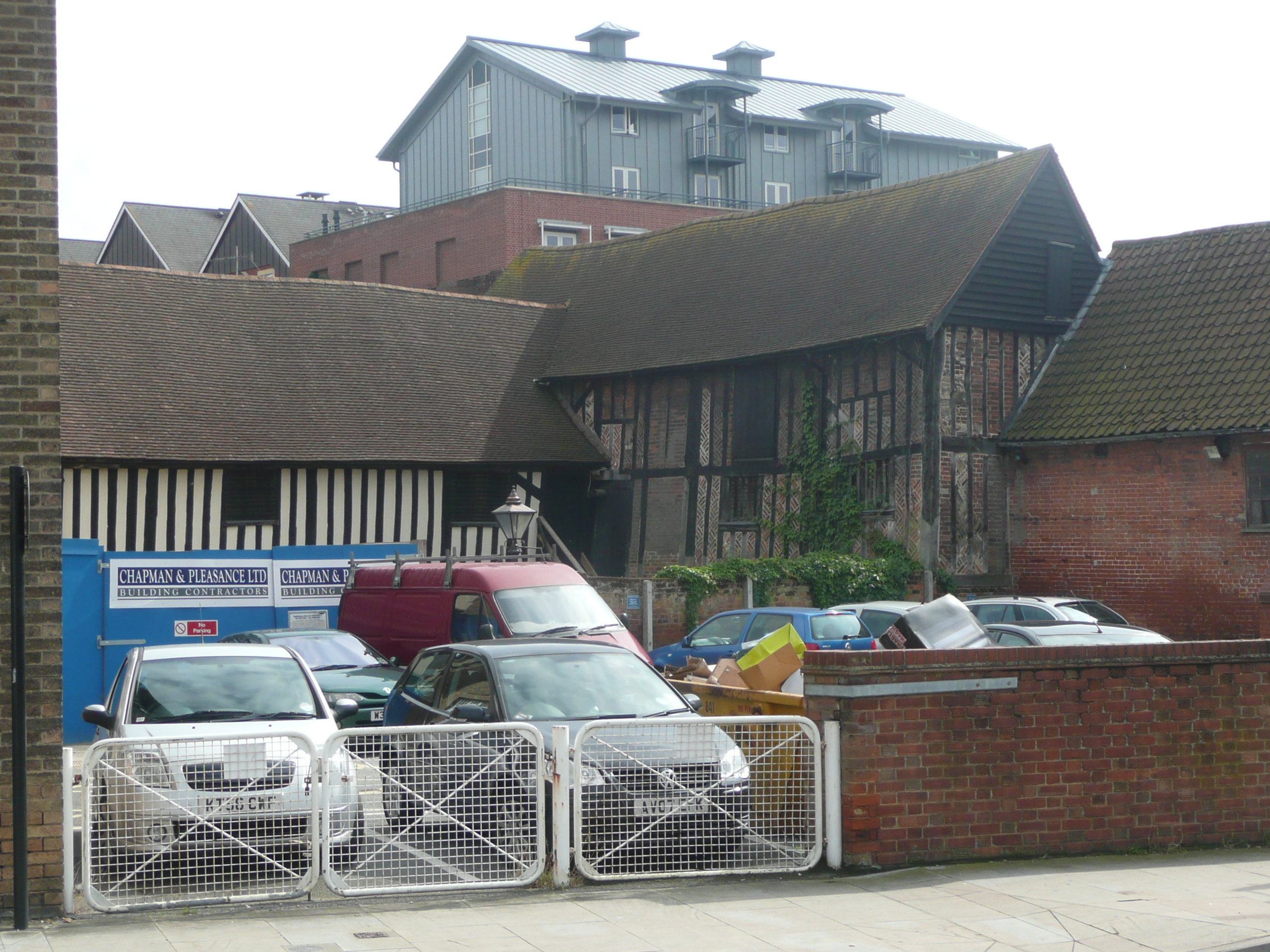
80 and 80a Fore Street

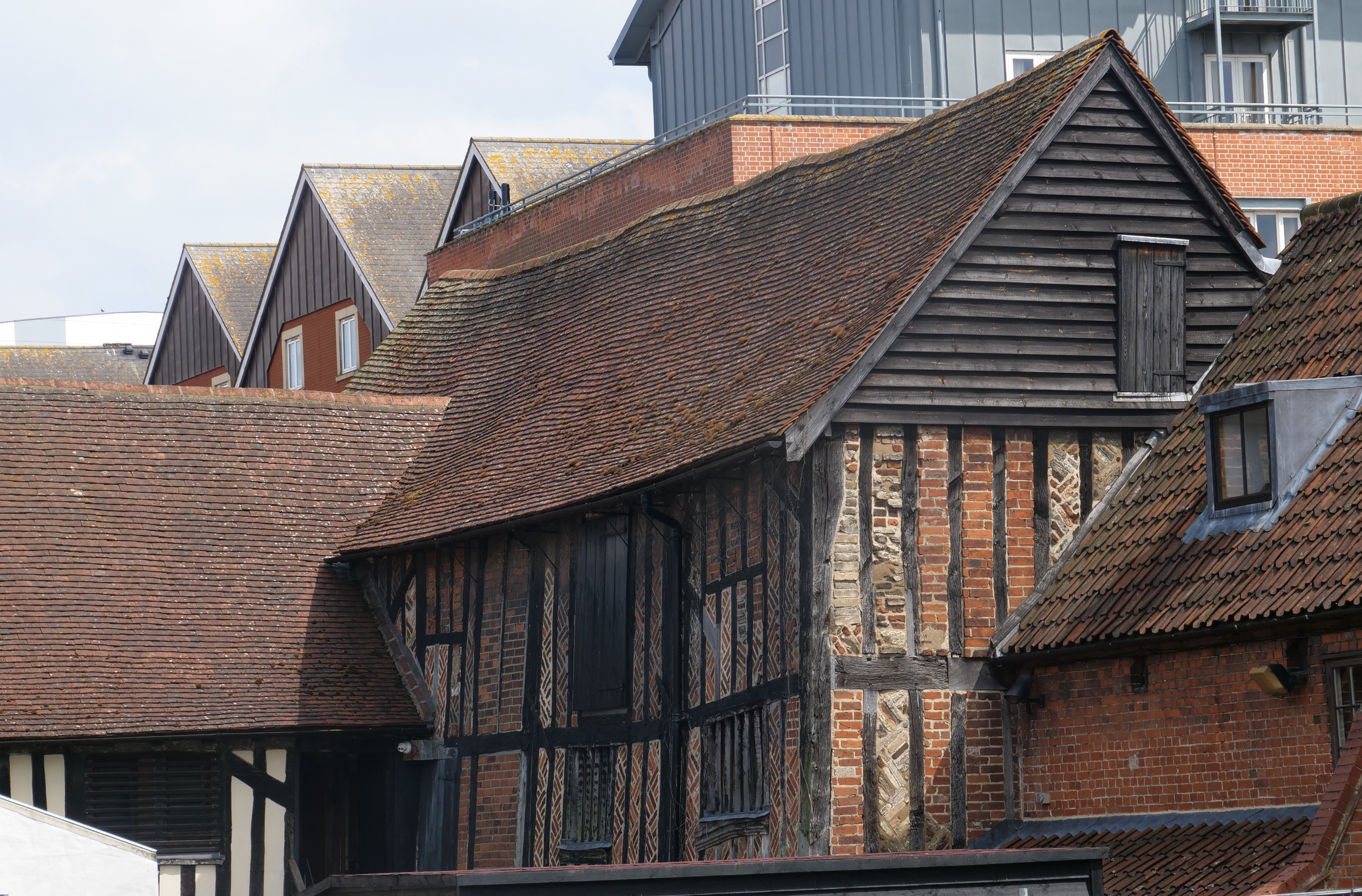
Warehouse, 80 and 80a Fore Street

The Issac Lord Complex was on the Heritage at Risk Register, an extensive scheme of structural repairs and re-roofing, with grant assistance from the local authority and English Heritage, in 2005 it was sold to a new owner which allowed all the buildings to be brought back into use.

== History ==
Some of the older parts of the buildings were constructed between 1430 and 1550.

=== Sizer and Lord ===
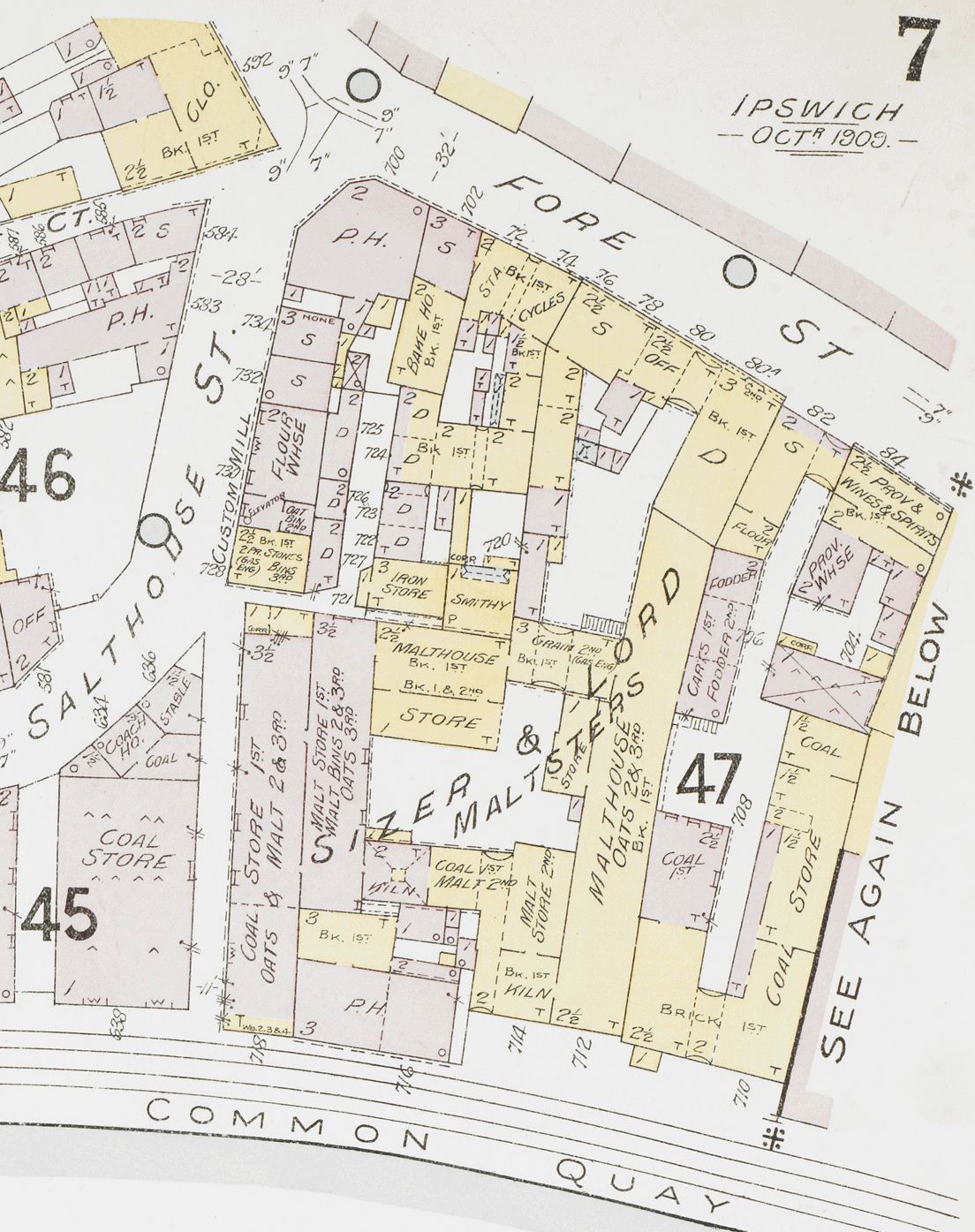
Plan of Sizer & Lord premises, 1909

The name "Isaacs" comes from Isaac Lord who, with Alfred Sizer, bought the property from the Cobbold brewing family in 1900.
