= Curson Lodge =

Historic mansion in Ipswich, England

Coordinates: 52.0549°N 1.1530°E

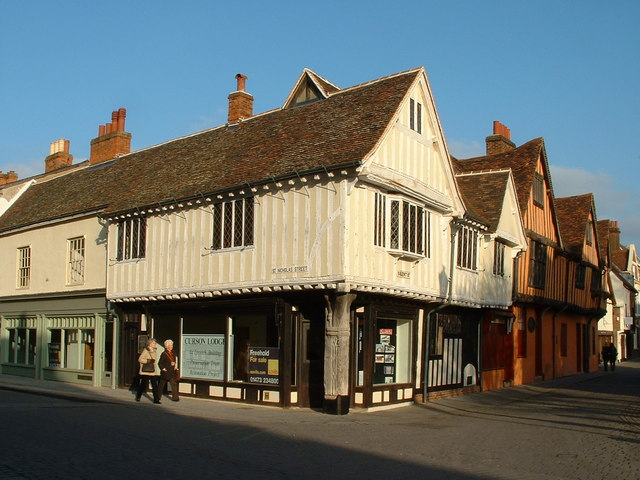
Curson Lodge, December 2007

Curson Lodge is a 15th century, Grade II* listed building at 45 and 45A (but the shop is now numbered as 47) St Nicholas Street in Ipswich. It was restored in 2007 with funds from the Ipswich Building Preservation Trust, a loan from the Architectural Heritage Fund and grants from and Ipswich Borough Council and English Heritage. The rest of the mansion extended along the other side of Silent Street and Peter Street.

The building acquired the name "Curson Lodge" during this restoration because it was part of a complex of buildings comprising the mansion of Robert Curson, a Tudor courtier. The rest of the mansion extended along the other side of Silent Street and Saint Peter Street as far down as Rose Lane. Curson Lodge is composed of 3 buildings which were listed at different times: 1 Silent Street, also 47 St Nicholas Street (No. 1265084), 3–9 Silent Street (No. 1235576), both listed on 19 December 1951, and 45 and 45a St Nicholas Street (No. 1235464), listed on 4 August 1972.
