= Great White Horse Hotel =

Former hotel in Ipswich, Suffolk, England

Coordinates: 52.0578°N 1.1561°E

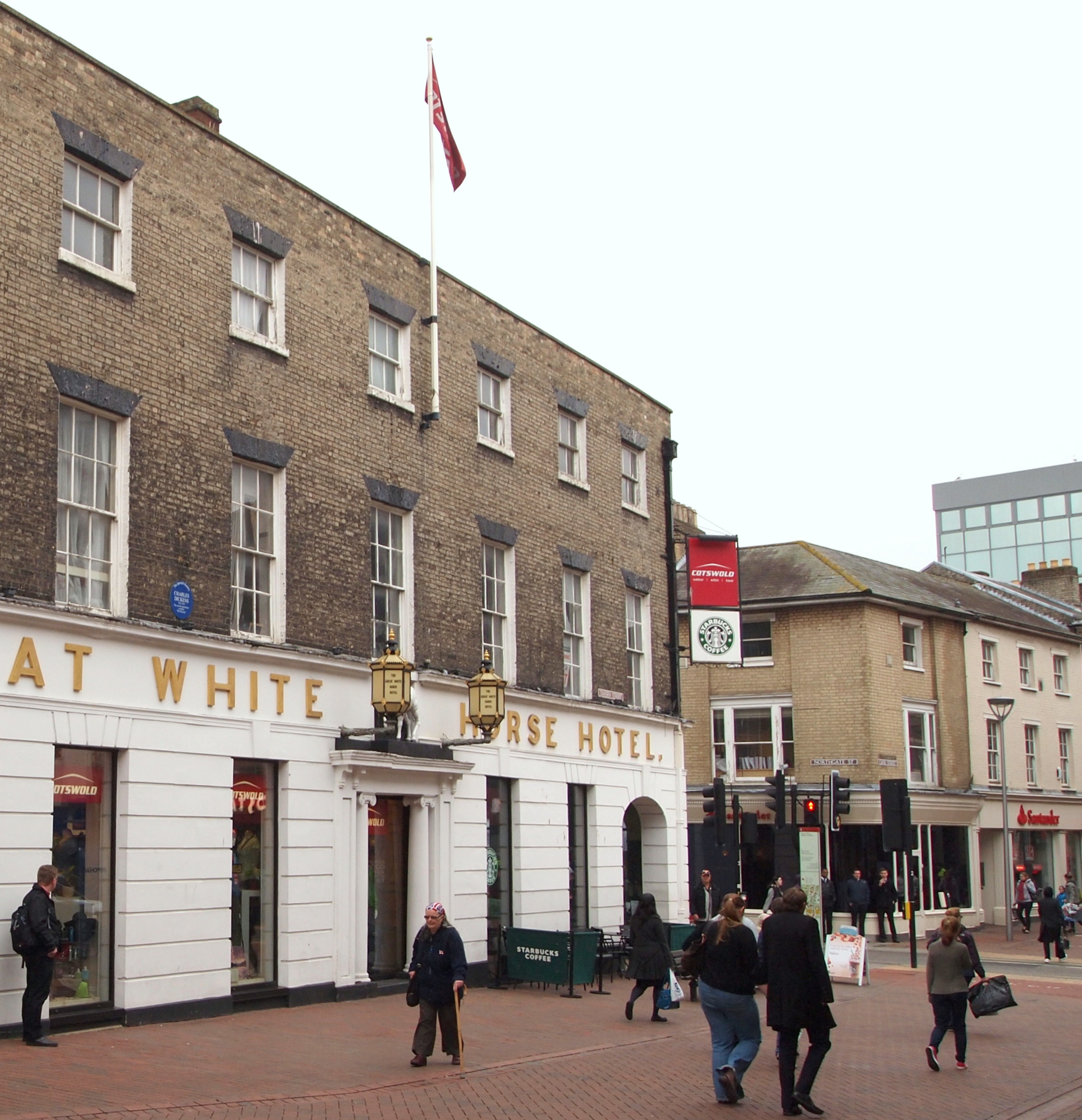

- Location within Suffolk
- Location: Ipswich, Suffolk, England

Listed Building – Grade II*
- Official name: Great White Horse Hotel
- Designated: 19 December 1951
- Reference no.: 1235799

The Great White Horse Hotel is a historic inn in the town centre of Ipswich, Suffolk, England. A hotel has existed on the site since 1518. Previously the site – located on the corner of Tavern Street and Northgate Street – had been used as a tavern in medieval times. It is a 16th or 17th century timber framed building refronted in the early 19th century. It featured in Charles Dicken's Pickwick Papers. On 19 December 1951 it became a Grade II* listed building. It is on the Heritage at Risk Register and is priority A. It is in the Central Conservation Area. The Great White Horse Hotel has hosted George II, Lord Nelson and the Beatles.
