= Holywells Park =

Public park in Ipswich, England

Coordinates: 52.0473°N 1.1719°E

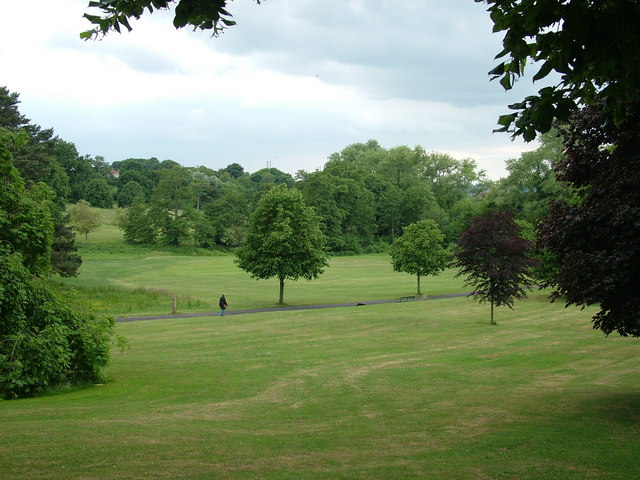
Holywells Park, June 2009

Holywells Park is a 67-acre (270,000 m^{2}) public park in Ipswich, England situated between Nacton Road and Cliff Lane, near to the Ipswich Waterfront.

== History ==
Tools from the stone age have been found on the site, as well as bronze age axes and Roman coins.

=== Medieval period ===
Some say the Manor once belonged to Edith of Wessex wife of Edward the Confessor. The daughter of Godwin, Earl of Wessex and sister to Harold II, she and another brother Gyrth Godwinson owned the Half Hundred of Ipswich. Gyrth also owned Wix Ufford located to the north of Bishop's Hill.

In the 13th century Holywells was part of the Manor at Bishops Wyke which was held by the Bishops of Norwich.

=== From Reformation to restoration ===
During the reign of Henry VIII the Manor was returned to the crown and then granted to Sir John Jermy.

The estate went through a number of owners, Francis Hewitt in 1635. It was later acquired by Thomas Essington, who sold it onto Samuel Barnardiston along with Brightwell Hall.

The land was bought by John Cobbold in 1812 who brought his wife Elizabeth Cobbold and their large family here to live in 1814. Cobbold later began using the areas natural springs to produce beer. In 1814 Holywells House was completed on the site of an old farmhouse (this building was demolished in 1962 due to wood rot and only the stable block remains). The estate was sold to Lord Woodbridge in 1930. He presented the estate to the people of Ipswich in 1935 and it was opened to the public by Ipswich Corporation in on 30 May 1936. The park became the responsibility of Ipswich Borough Council in 1974, following the implementation of the Local Government Act 1972.

=== Holywells Park Conservation Project ===
In 1983 the Council established the Holywells Park Conservation Project. This included a nature trail which visited 12 stations from the Stable Block to Kissing Gate Lane.

Holywells park is now a designated a Conservation Area.

In July 2012, Ipswich Borough Council received a grant of £2.8 million from the Heritage Lottery Fund (HLF) and Big Lottery Fund (BIG) for the Holywells "Parks for People" restoration project. The HLF grant was supplemented by funding from the Friends of Holywells Park and by the Borough Council. The grant was used to improve a range of park facilities and to enable the renovation of the Stable Block, converting it into a vibrant visitor centre and café with an education area and function room. The conservatory was refurbished and turned into a multi-function area that can be used for exhibitions, talks, meetings and other functions. The Stable Block and Conservatory are both listed buildings.

== Activities ==
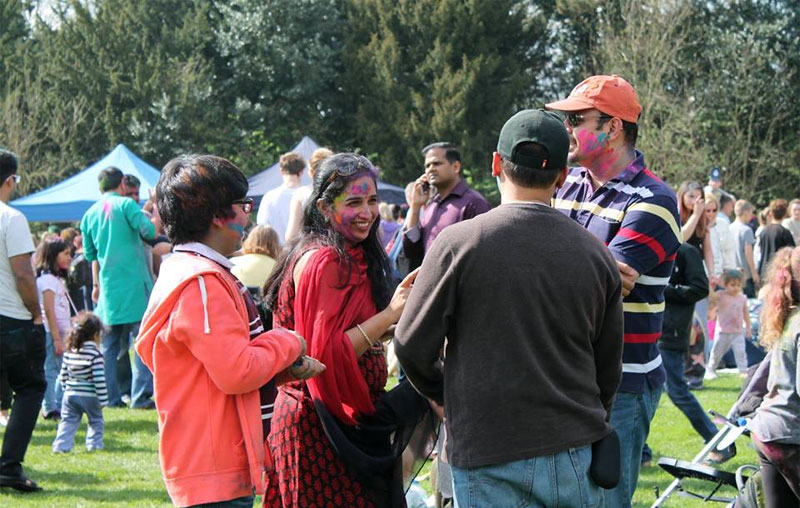
Holi Festival of Colour, 2 April 2017

Established in 2001, the Friends of Holywells Park are a volunteer group whose aim is to increase protection and enjoyment of Holywells Park.

The park hosts numerous events throughout the year organised by Friends of Holywells Park, Suffolk Wildlife Trust, Ipswich Borough Council and charitable and private organisations. Popular among the regular events are Family Fun Days (July–August), Practical conservation activities, a bat walk (August), a Cold Fair (January), Holi Festival of Colour (April), The Nearly Music Festival (and other concerts like 'Chopin in the Park'), Tea Dances and many more.

The park is frequently used for charity rides, runs and walks.

== Sport and leisure ==
In summer 2007 work was completed on a new play area, situated on the site of the old play area. Work was also carried out to remove the paddling pool and in turn making a new stream joining the 3rd pond to the lake at the Holywells road end of the park. The play area for children, incorporates a hi-tech teen play facility, Water play facility (summer only) kiosk, toilets and changing room.

There is a trim trail that includes equipment such as balance beams, a pole climb, and a ladder walk. The park also features multiple paths used by joggers and walkers.

The park is home to Holywells Bowling Club. It also has a Victorian conservatory and a walled garden.

There are four entrances to the park: Cliff Lane, Myrtle Road, Bishop’s Hill and Nacton Road. Blue Badge parking is available at the Cliff Lane entrance and public parking at Athena Hall off Duke Street, IP3 0DT

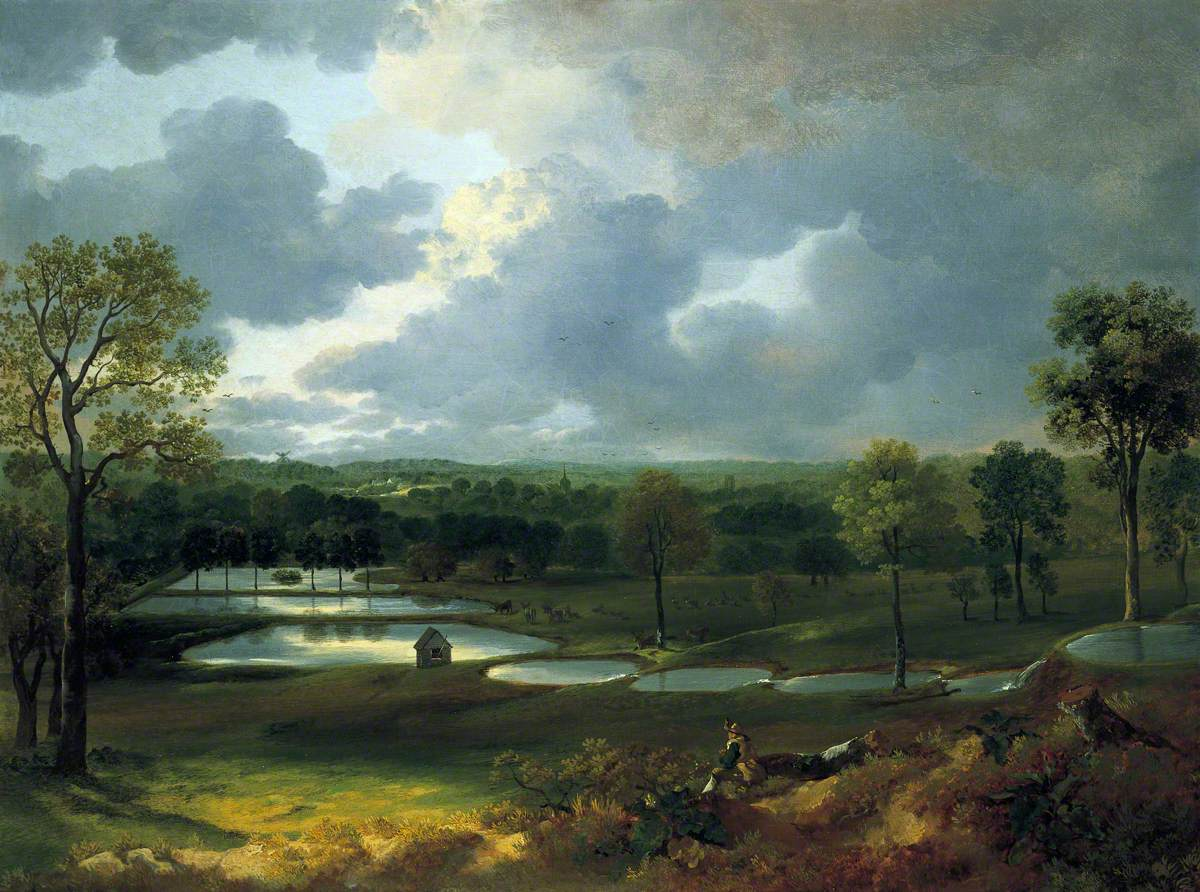
Holywells Park with its water supply network as portrayed by Thomas Gainsborough, 1750

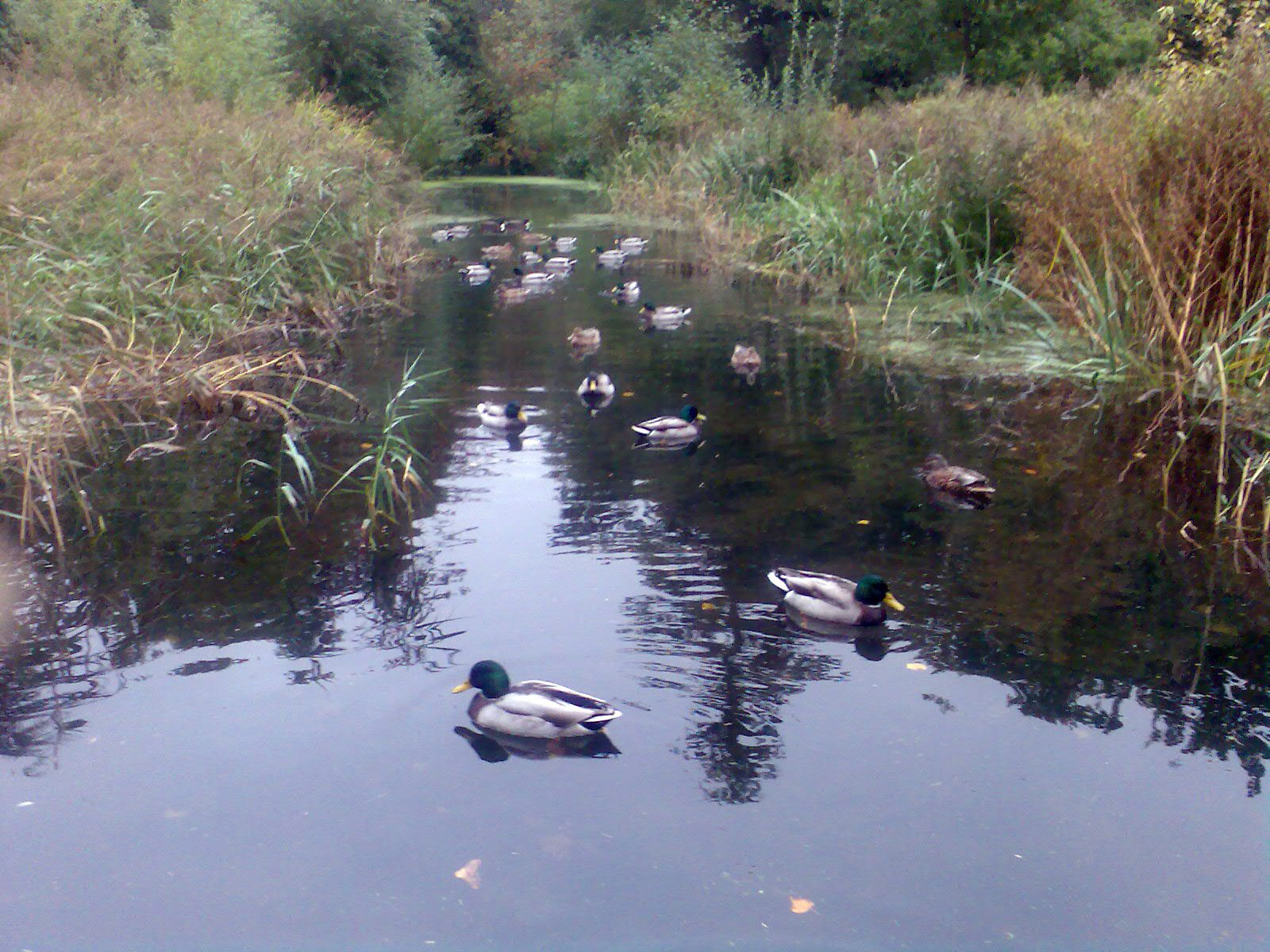
Ducks on Alder Carr, one of the ponds in Holywells Park

== Water supply ==
Holywells has played an important role in providing a water supply to Ipswich.

== Wildlife and ornithology ==
The park contains a range of habitats, including formal gardens, ponds, fields and woodland, which support various plant and animal species. Protected bat species recorded in the park include pipistrelle and barbastelles. Fallen and standing deadwood provide habitats for invertebrates, while species found in the park include stag beetle, five banded weevil-wasps, bee wolves and golden hover flies. The ponds attract aquatic insects and birds, including kingfishers, while woodpeckers have also been recorded in the park.

The Suffolk Wildlife Trust runs free wildlife sessions for schools and the park has an active team of park rangers which encourage young people with a love for nature, to build their practical conservation skills by learning from and working alongside local wildlife experts.

== Holywells Park Conservation Area ==
In 2003 the Park gained Conservation Area status, along with the neighbouring Margaret Catchpole Public House. Pond 5 is known as Alder Carr and is a biodiversity action plan habitat.
