= Christchurch Mansion =

Historic house and museum in Ipswich, England

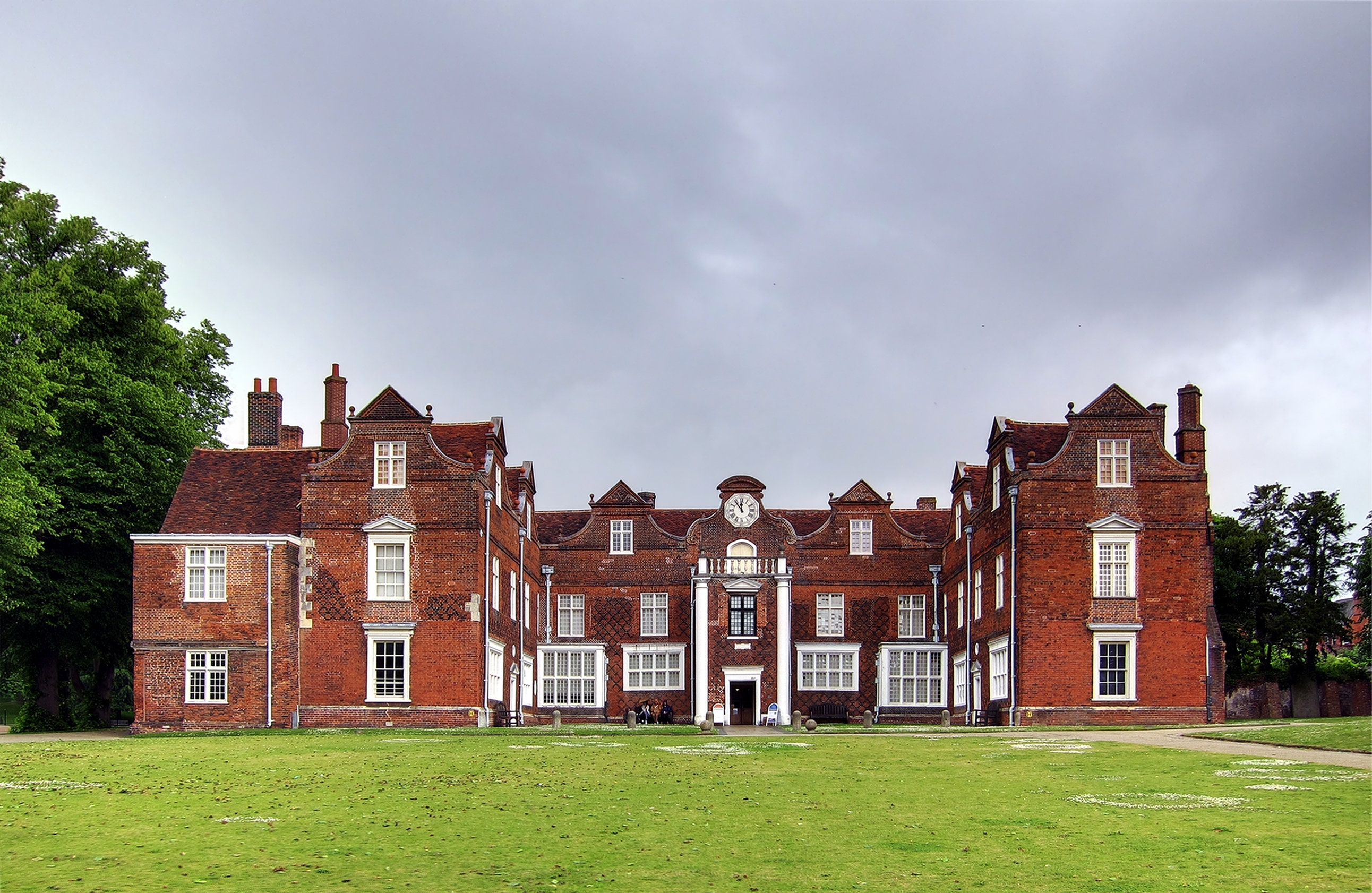
- Christchurch Mansion from the front
- Former name: Withipoll House
- Established: 1885; 141 years ago
- Location: Christchurch Park; Ipswich, England
- Coordinates: 52°03′38″N 1°09′30″E
- Visitors: 53,201 (2019)
- Website: ipswich.cimuseums.org.uk/visit/christchurch-mansion

Christchurch Mansion is a substantial Tudor brick mansion house built in Ipswich, Suffolk, England, by Edmund Withypoll (also written "Withipoll") around 1548–1550. The Grade I listed building is located within Christchurch Park and sits by the southern gates close to the town centre of Ipswich. The mansion belonged to various noble families throughout its history but was purchased by the Ipswich Borough Council in 1884. Since 1885, the building has been used as a museum and is today run by the municipally run Colchester and Ipswich Museums Service (CIMS) organisation. The museum's rooms are preserved as past inhabitants would have known them, complete with original items such as furniture, fine clothing and children's toys. The museum also holds a collection of paintings by renowned local artists including Harry Becker, John Constable and Thomas Gainsborough. The Mansion is free to enter and booking is not required.

== History ==
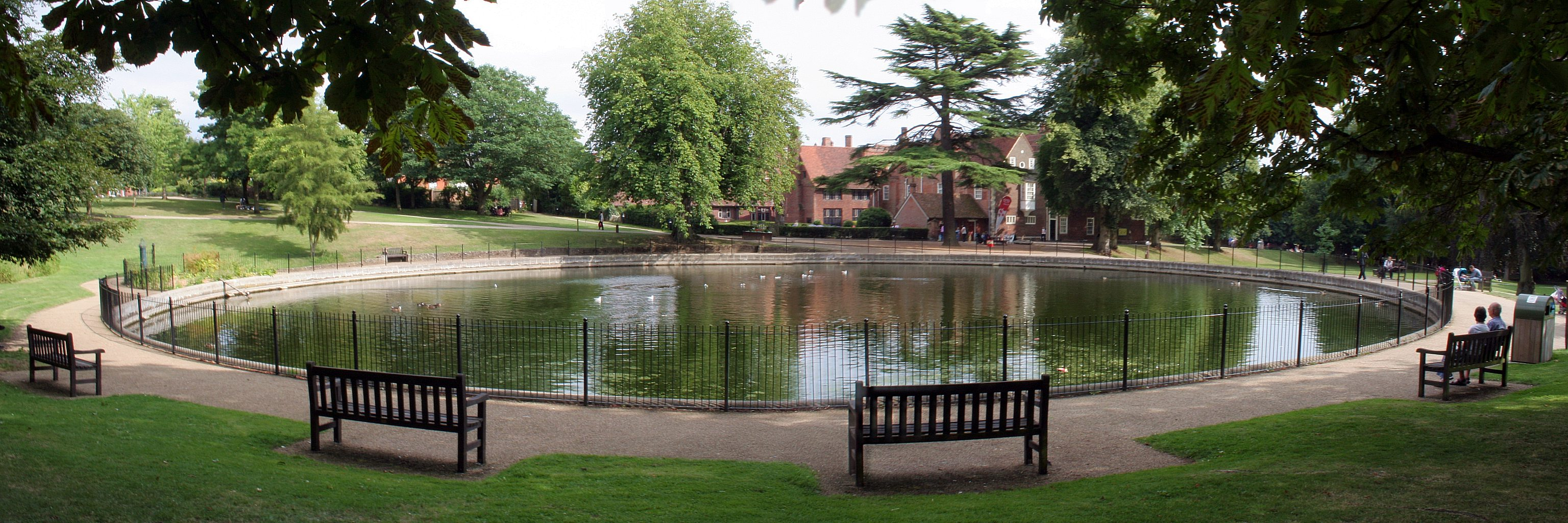
The round pond of Christchurch Park with the mansion in the background

Christchurch Park was originally the grounds of the Priory of the Holy Trinity, with an area of many square miles, coming up to the medieval town walls. During Henry VIII's Dissolution of the Monasteries, the monastery was dissolved and the land was purchased by Paul Withypoll, Master Merchant Taylor and Merchant Adventurer, who died in 1547. Upon the manor, known as Christ Church Withipoll, his son and heir Edmund Withypoll built Withipoll House in 1548–50, the ground floor masonry of which remains, although refurbished internally under subsequent owners. A survival from the original is the house's Latin motto, on a stone dated 1549:

"Frugalitatem sic servas, ut dissipationem non incurras."

His granddaughter Elizabeth Withypoll married Leicester Devereux, 6th Viscount Hereford and the mansion passed to the Devereux family, who rebuilt the upper floors after a fire in about 1670, when the main porch was also added. In 1734, Claude Fonnereau purchased the mansion from Price Devereux, 10th Viscount Hereford. A street next to the park is named after the family.

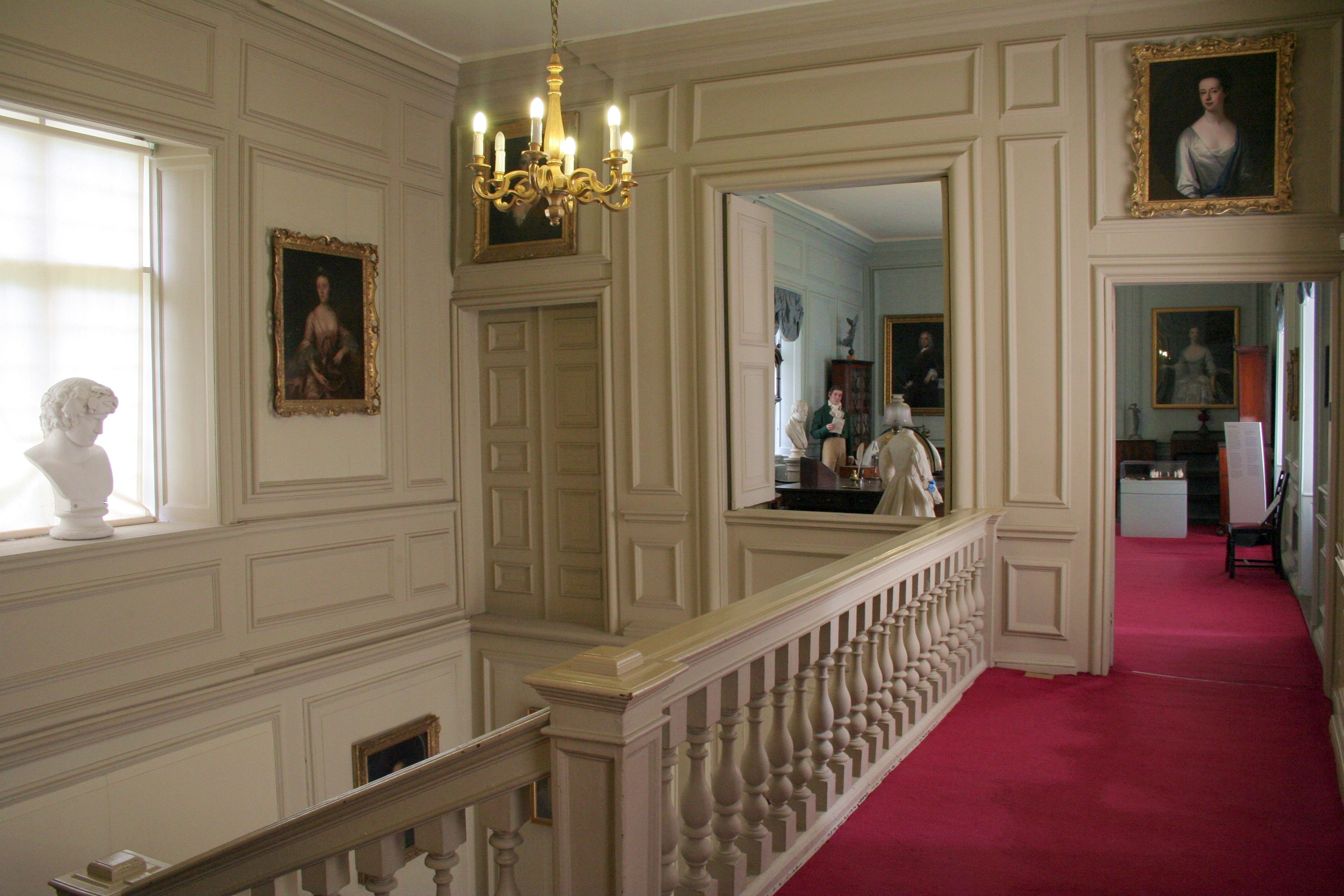
A staircase and the library in August 2013

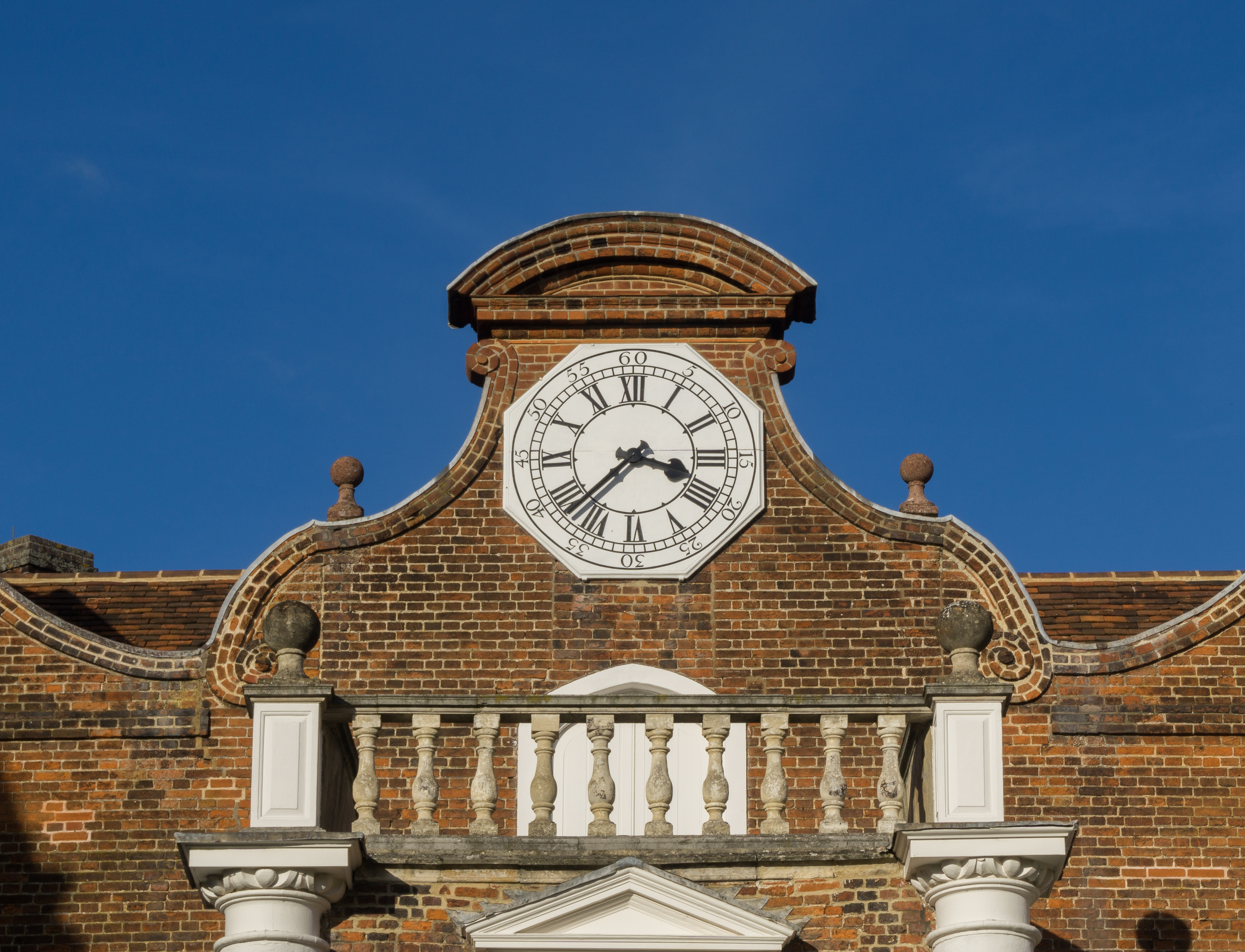
Clock over the main entrance of Christchurch Mansion

W.C. Fonnereau in 1848 laid out and developed Fonnereau Road as a superior residential area. In 1894 the mansion was bought by Felix Cobbold from a syndicate of property developments, to save the building from demolition. Cobbold, a wealthy local businessman and philanthropist, then offered to give it to the Ipswich Corporation to establish a Museum and Art Gallery, together with a further £20,000 (equivalent to £2,250,000 in 2025) in Ipswich Stock for the purchase of artworks. His offer was on condition that the Corporation buy the surrounding parkland for the people of Ipswich. It took Cobbold three attempts to get the corporation to agree to this, but in February 1895 the mansion was transferred to the town and in April 1895 the Corporation purchased the central part of the park. The corporation acquired the Upper Arboretum (laid out for public use in 1848) in 1928. Felix Cobbold, among other members of the wealthy Cobbold family, have donated a great deal of land to the people of Ipswich, including the former Ipswich Racecourse.

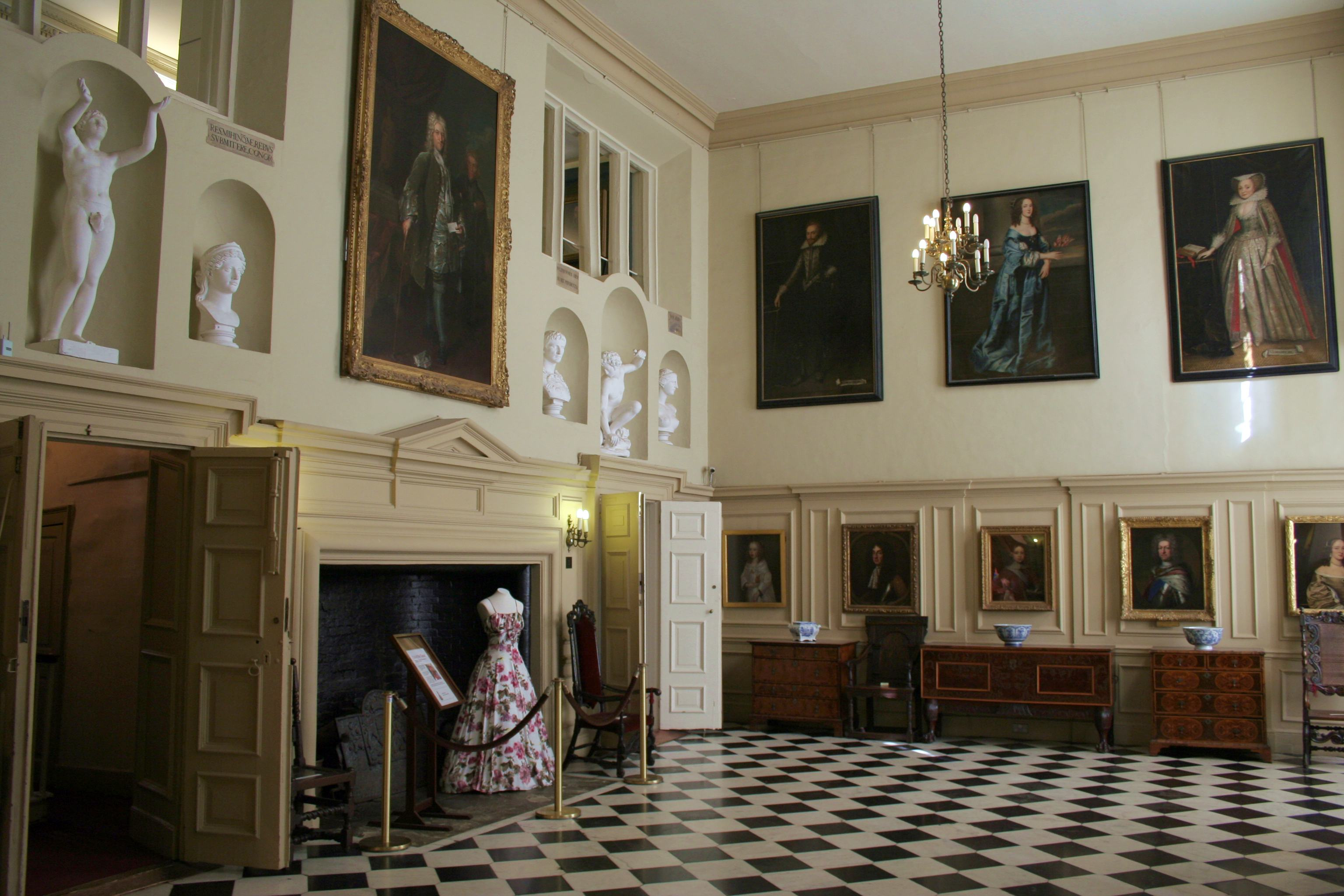
The Great Hall in August 2013

The restoration of the Mansion for its public opening was the work of the Ipswich architect John Shewell Corder, and its redevelopment as a Museum was undertaken by Frank Woolnough, Curator of the Ipswich Corporation Museum 1893–1920. Woolnough, an active member of the Museums Association and of the Savage Club, also developed its use as a venue for annual meetings of various Societies, and for educational purposes. During this time it was also the home of the archaeological galleries of Miss Nina Layard, over which she had honorary curatorship. Under curator Guy Maynard (1920–1952) the enlargement of the fine and decorative art and furniture collections continued. The Thomas Gainsborough Bicentenary Exhibition of 1927, including also works by George Frost and John Constable, showcased the mansion as the home of a collection of national importance. The structure was further enlarged with the addition of the new Wolsey Art Gallery at the rear, and an entire two-storey wing rescued in 1924 from the demolition of a Tudor merchant's house.

In 2019, the museum hosted Made in Suffolk, an exclusive exhibition dedicated to the Suffolk global superstar Ed Sheeran. It featured many personal items of Ed Sheeran throughout his journey to stardom, including personal sketches, written song lyrics, school reports and famed awards trophies from the Brit Awards and Grammys.

== Notable works ==
- Lady Drury's Closet
- Golding Constable's Flower Garden and Golding Constable's Kitchen Garden
- A collection of seventy-seven pastels by Blanche Georgiana Vulliamy of First World War searchlights

== Media appearance ==
- It was the location for two episodes of BBC One's Antiques Roadshow filmed in 2020 and transmitted in January and March 2021.

== Gallery ==
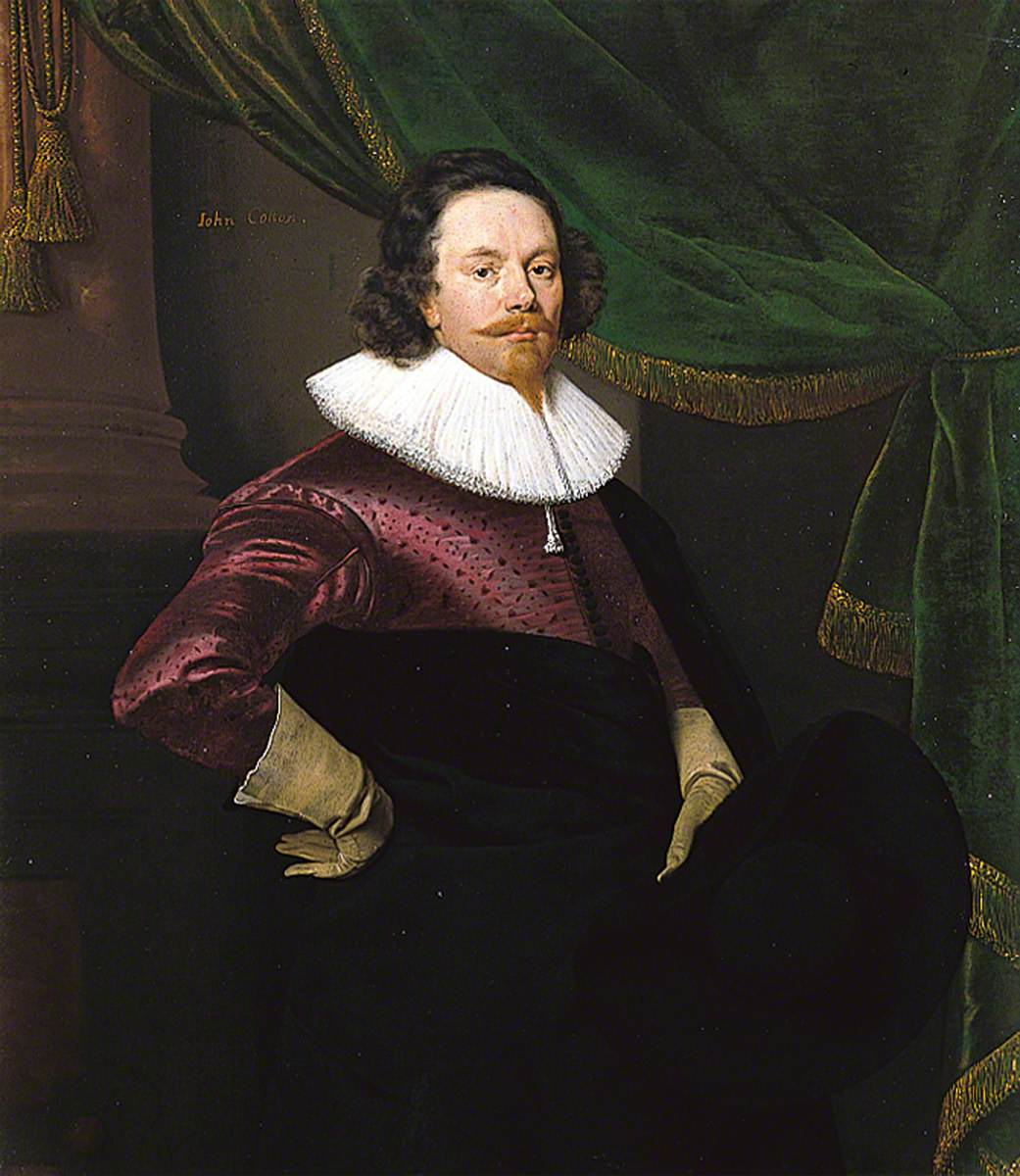
John Cotton by Daniel Mytens, c.1628

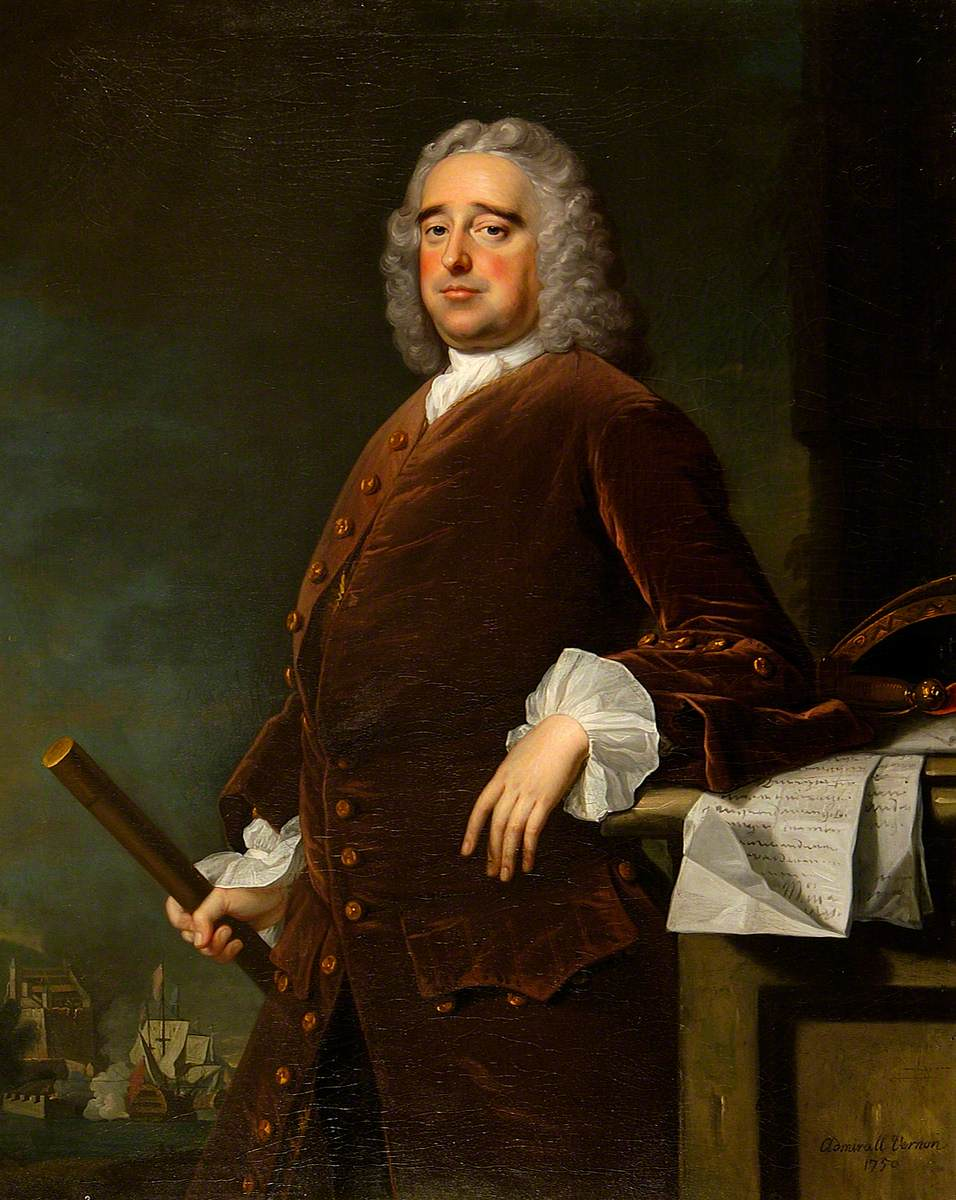
Edward Vernon by Thomas Hudson, 1739

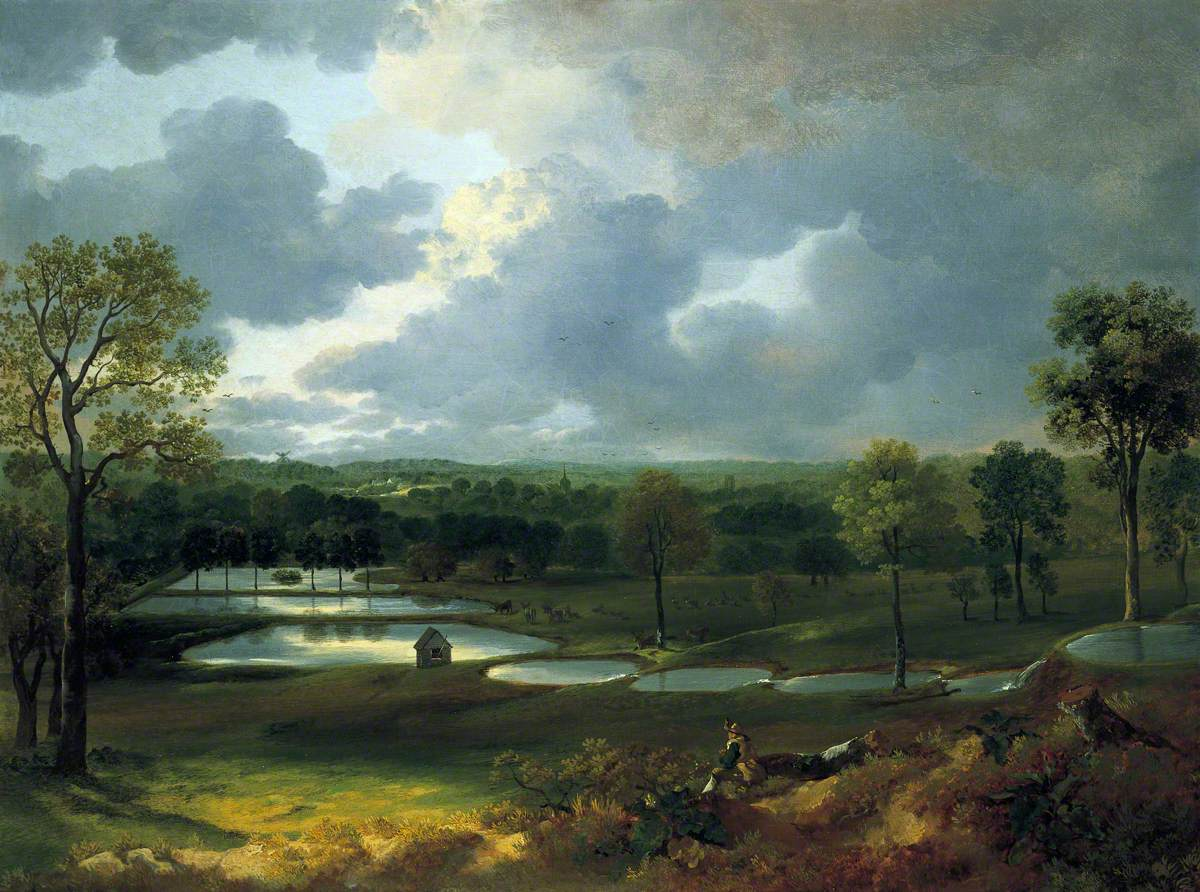
Holywells Park, Ipswich by Thomas Gainsborough, c.1750

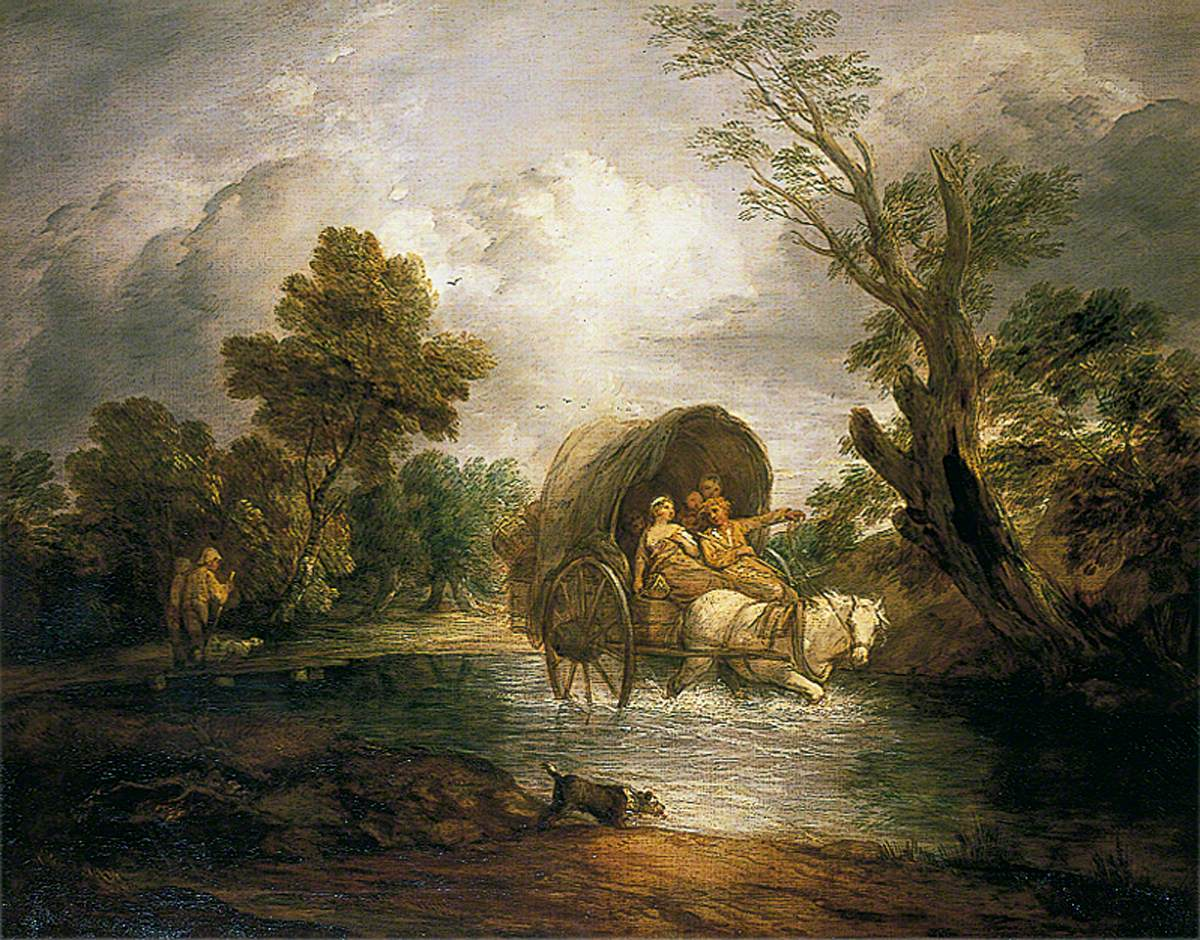
A Country Cart Crossing the Ford by Thomas Gainsborough, 1786

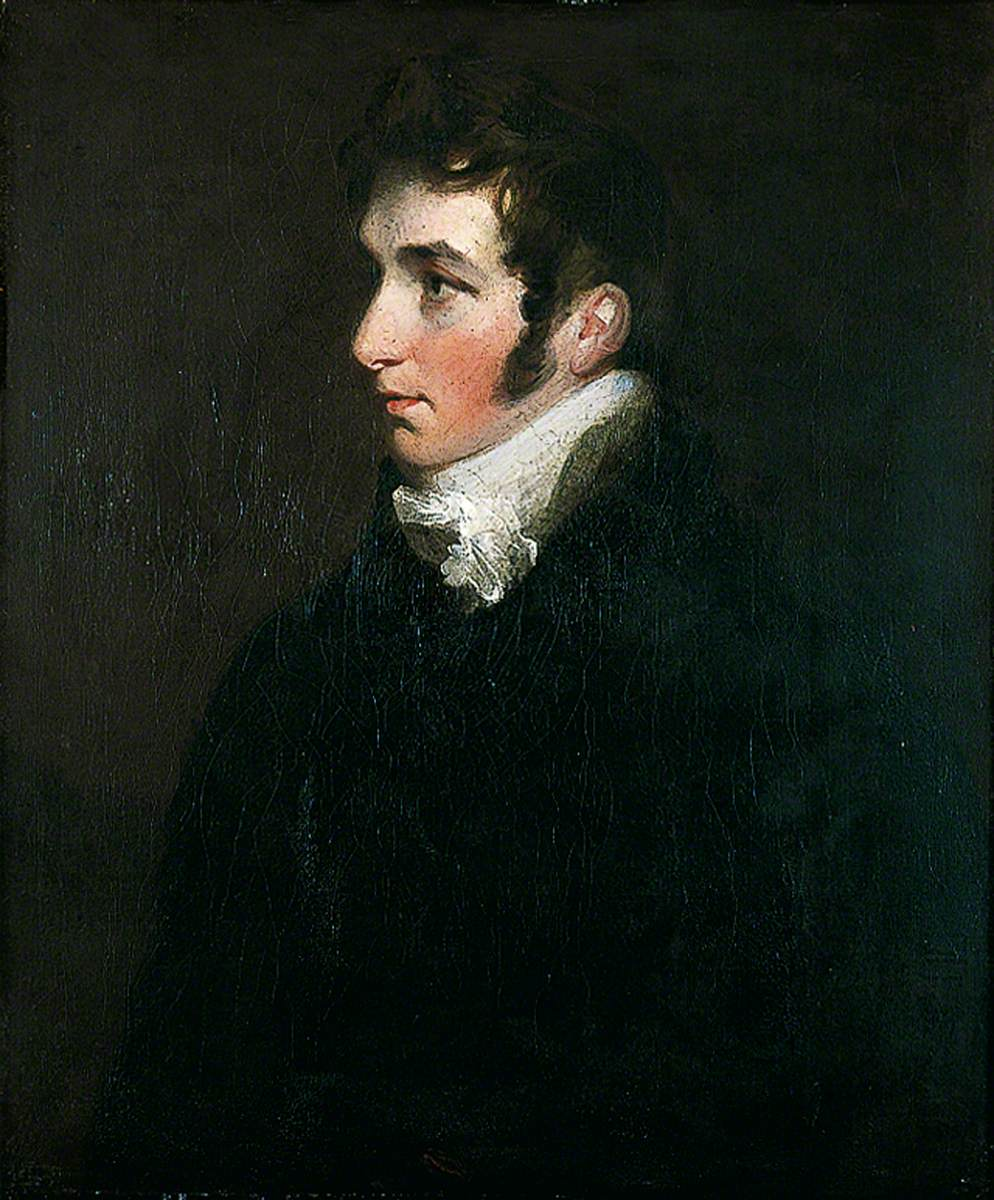
Portrait of Abram Constable by John Constable, c.1806

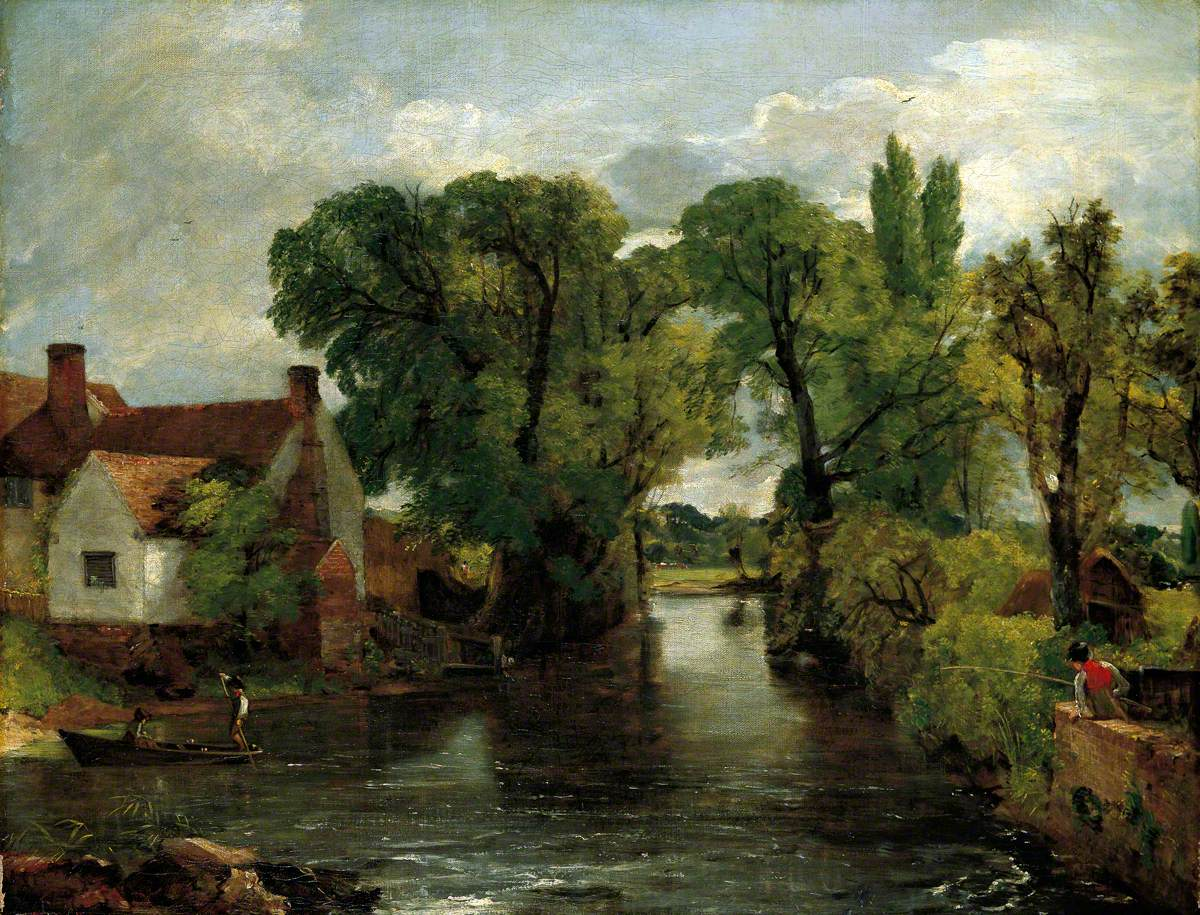
The Mill Stream by John Constable, 1814

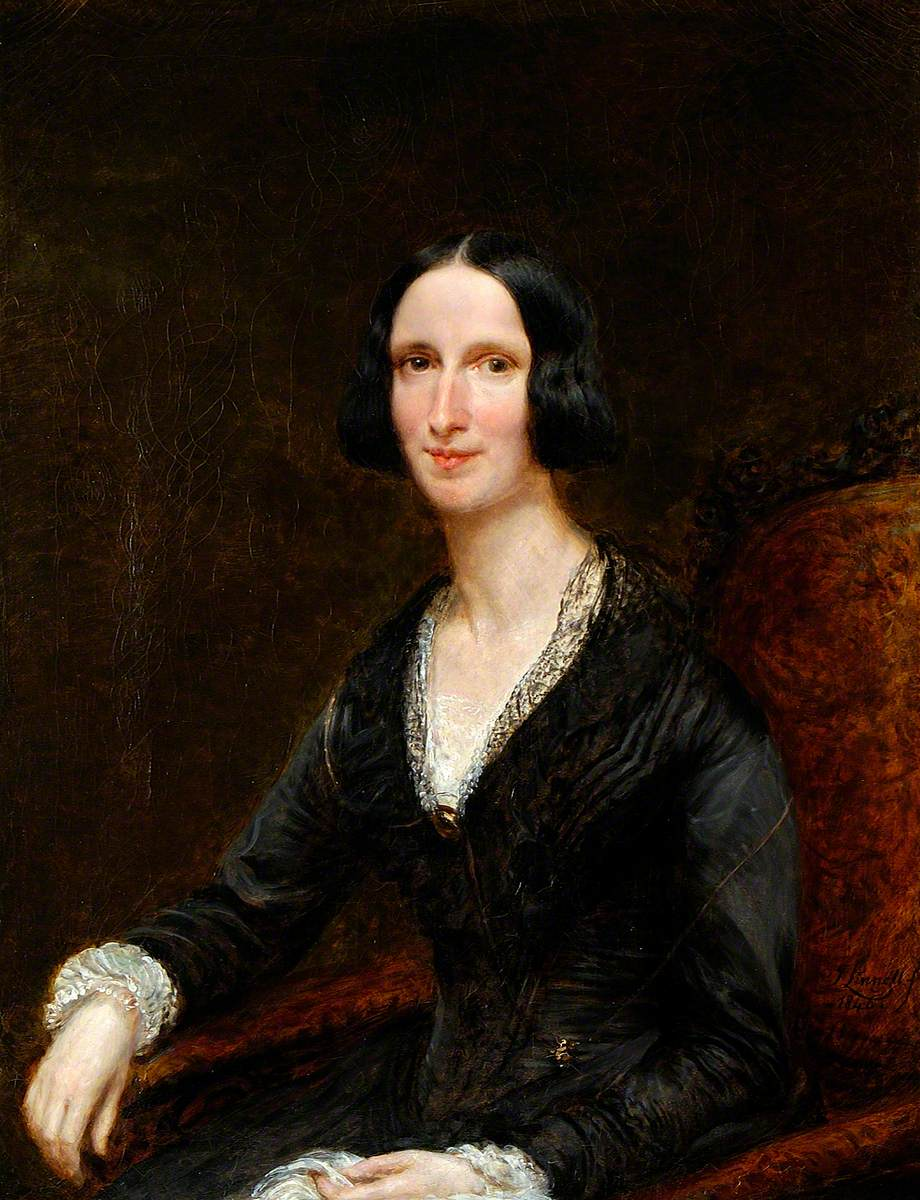
Katherine Georgina Fonnereau by John Linnell, 1846

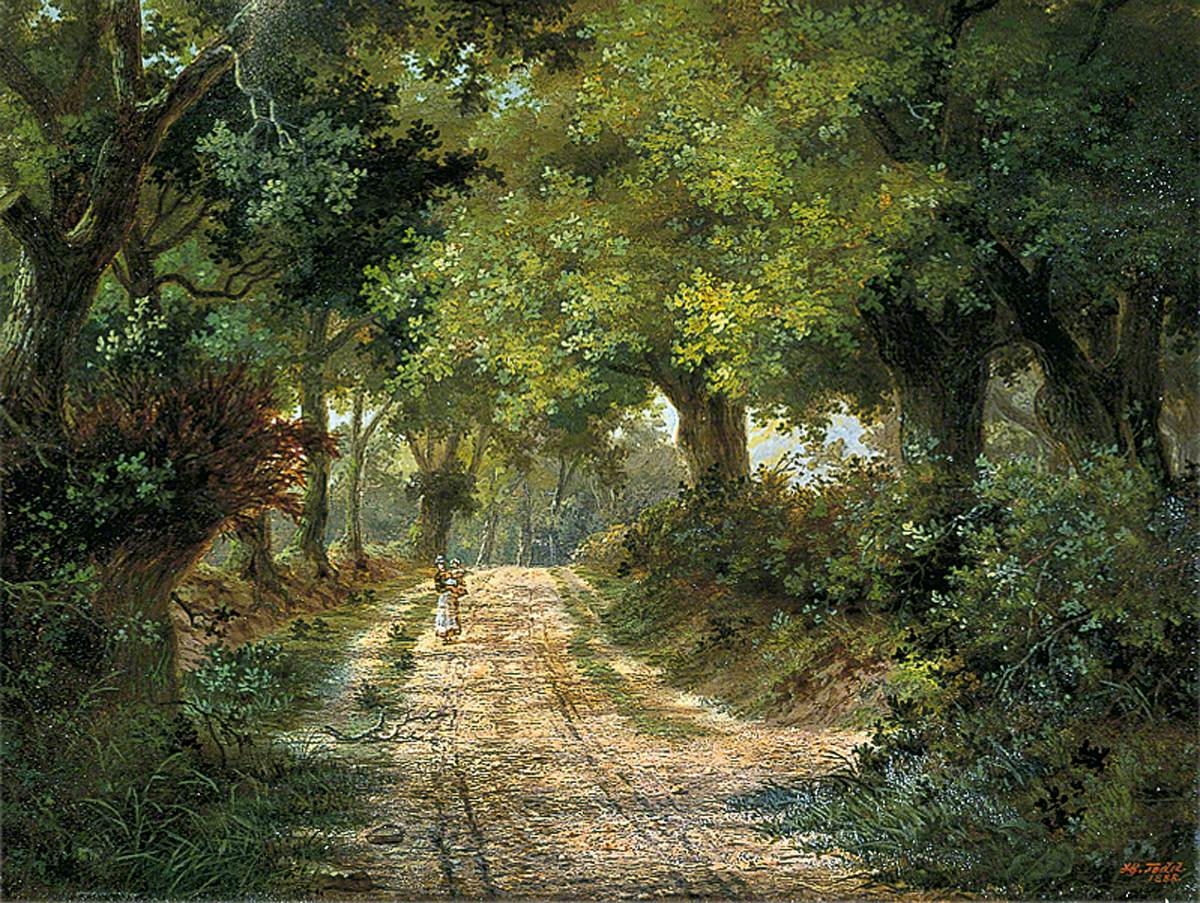
Gainsborough Lane, Ipswich by Henry George Todd, 1888

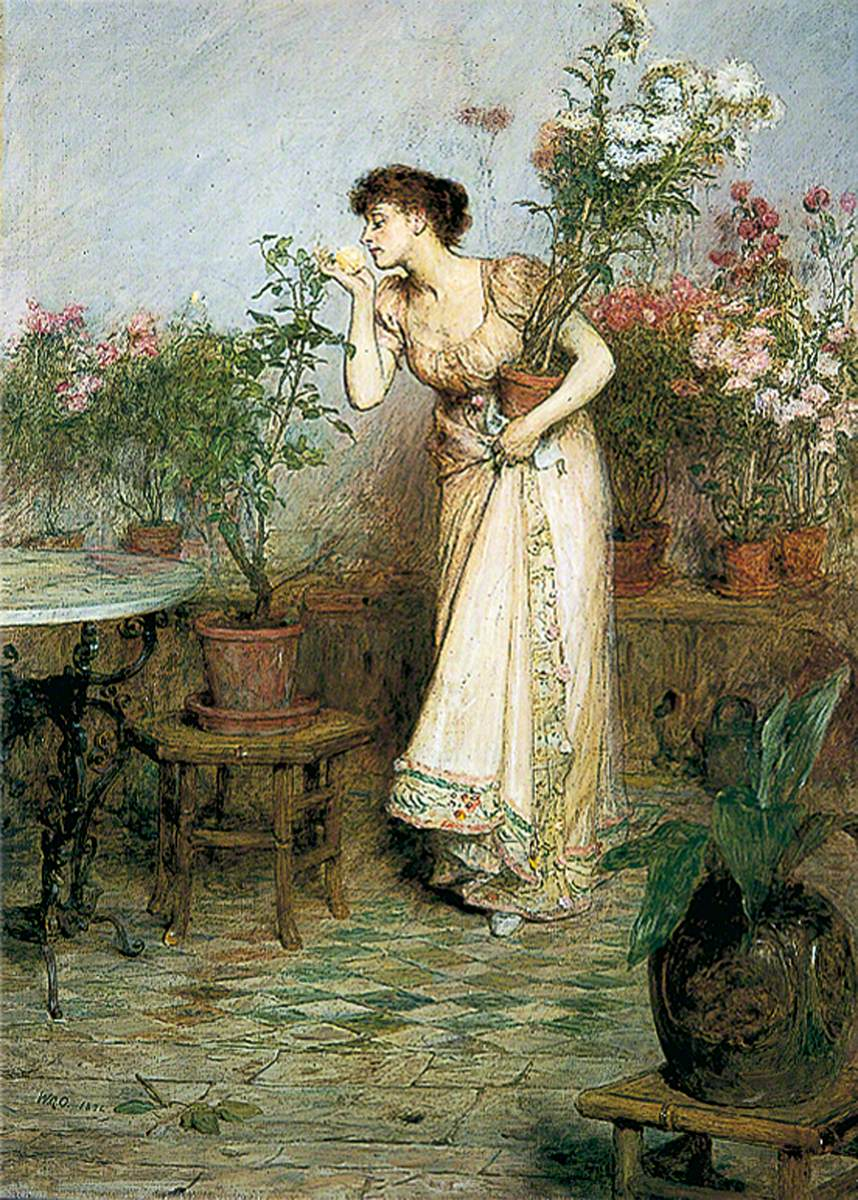
In the Conservatory by William Quiller Orchardson, 1894
