= Ipswich Museum =

Museum in Ipswich, England

Coordinates: 52.0606°N 1.1509°E

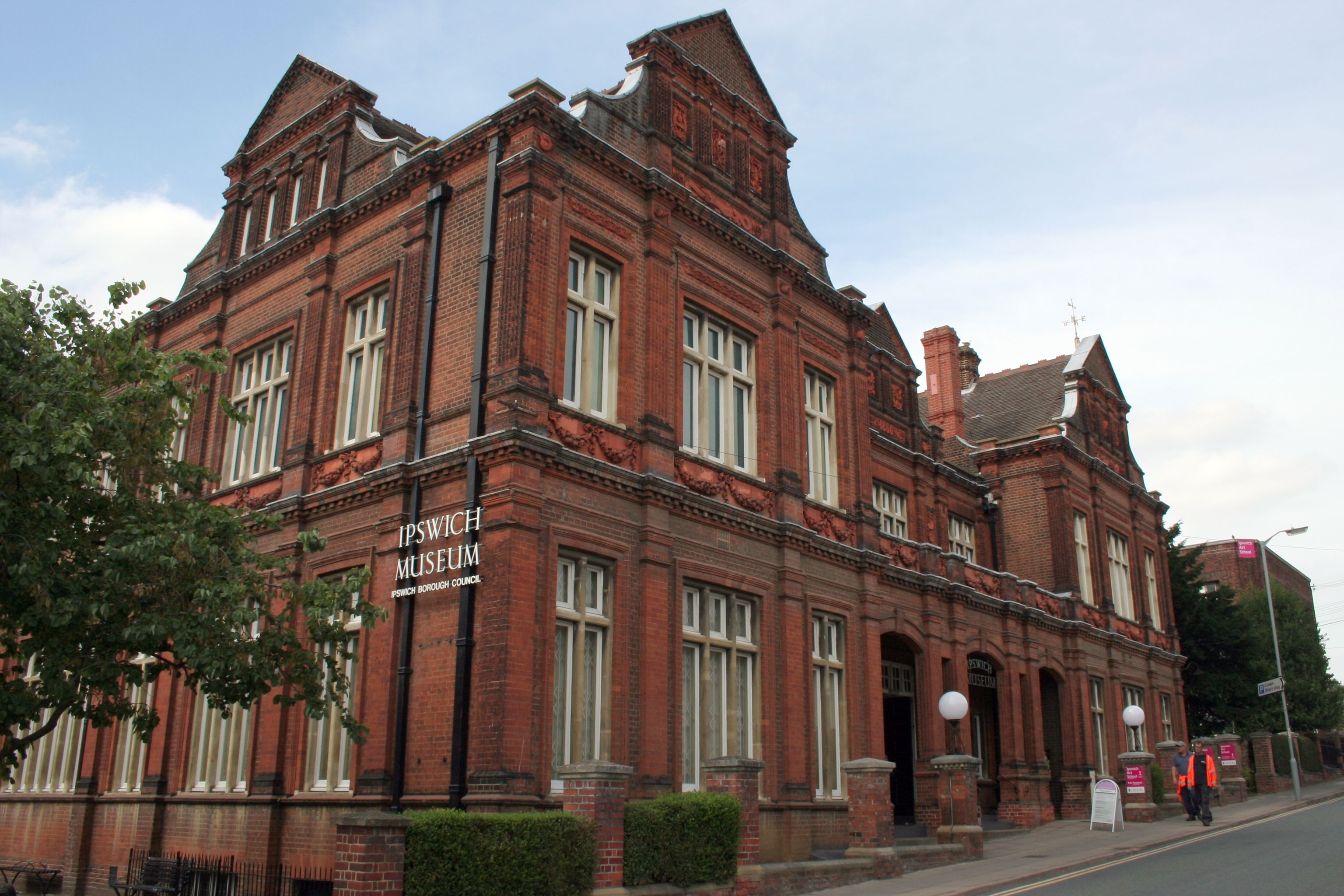
- Established: 1846
- Location: High Street, Ipswich, IP1 3QH
- Director: James Steward
- Website: ipswich.cimuseums.org.uk

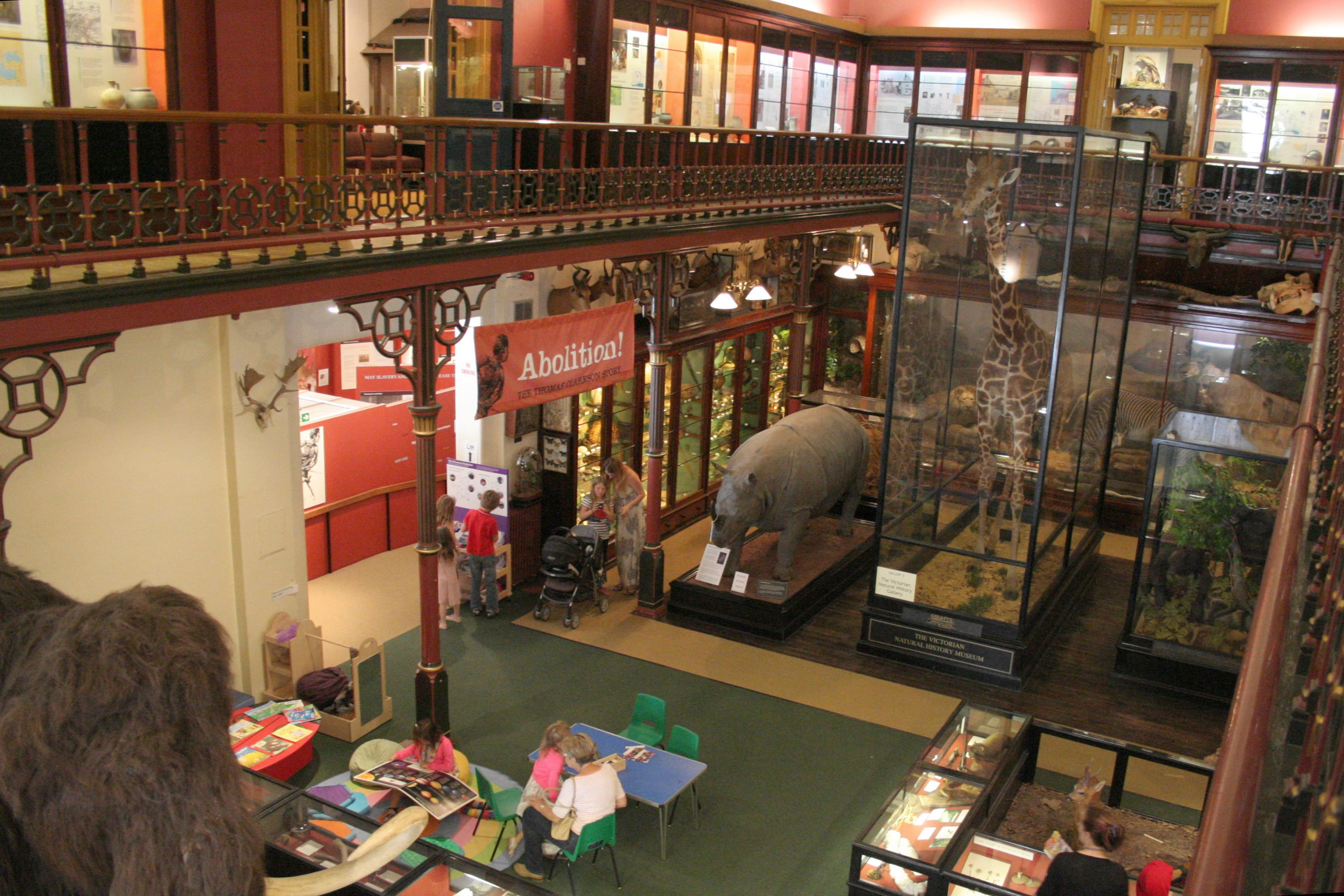
The natural history gallery in August 2013

Ipswich Museum is a registered museum of culture, history and natural heritage, located in a Grade II* listed building on High Street in Ipswich, the county town of Suffolk. It was historically the leading regional museum in Suffolk, housing collections drawn from both the former counties of East Suffolk and West Suffolk, which were amalgamated in 1974.

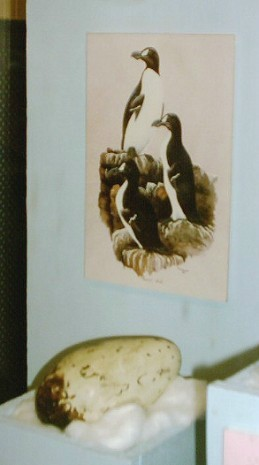
Egg of great auk, Ipswich Museum, England

The original foundation of 1846, devoted primarily to Natural History, was moved to new premises in High Street in 1881. In about 1895 Christchurch Mansion, a large 16th-century house near the town centre in Christchurch Park, was given to the town. It was developed as a second venue under the same management and curatorship, devoted particularly to fine and decorative arts. Both are parts of one institution and draw on the same central core of collections. The entire service was merged with that of Colchester (Essex) on 1 April 2007 to form Colchester + Ipswich Museums. It is one of Ipswich's main features. The museum closed in October 2022 to undergo what is expected to be a 3-year refurbishment.

== History ==
=== The early museum, 1846–1853 ===
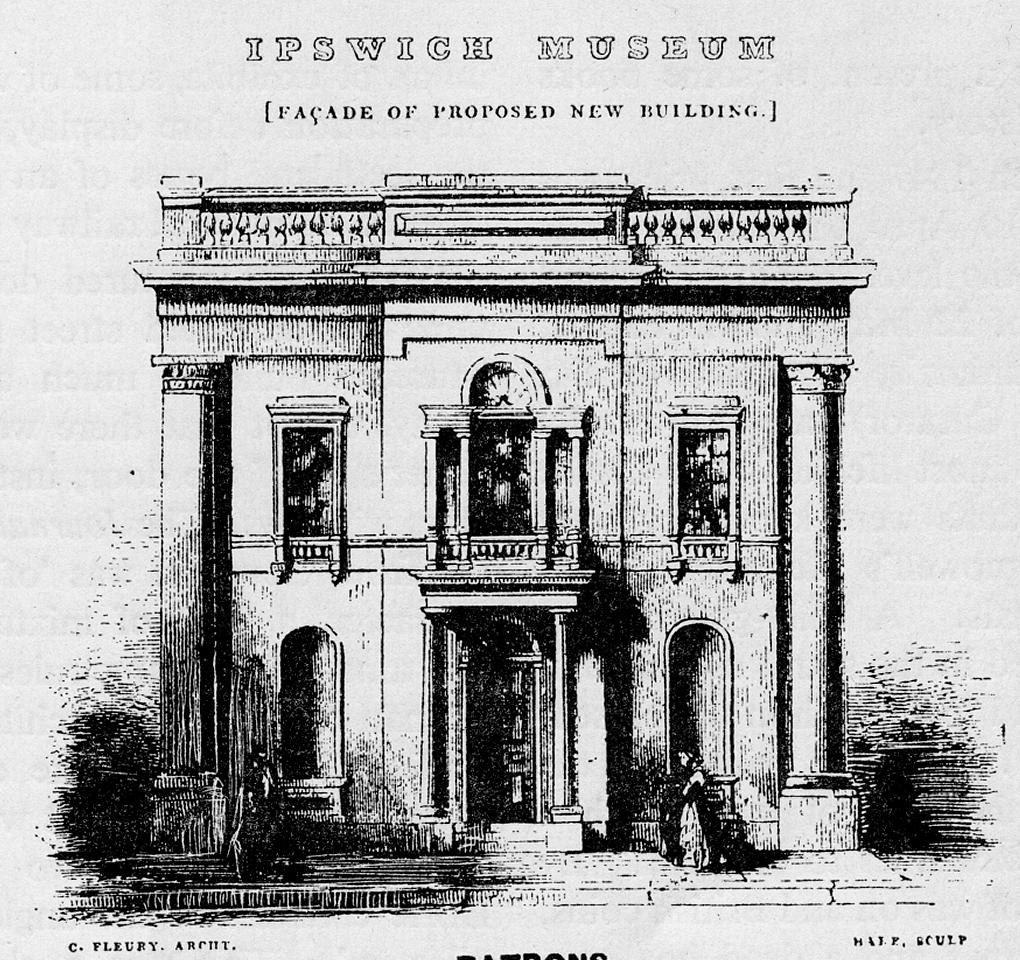
The museum of 1847

The museum was founded in 1846 and opened in December 1847 in Museum Street, Ipswich then newly laid-out, with the specific remit to educate the working classes in natural history. From 1847 to 1853 it was run by a committee on behalf of subscribers, with open evenings for the public. The first president was the entomologist William Kirby (1759–1850), an original Fellow of the Linnean Society, and its founding Patron was Bishop Stanley of Norwich, who presided at the opening. The first Curator was Dr. William Barnard Clarke: following his resignation in 1850 he was replaced by Mr David Wooster.

The primary initiative for this philanthropic venture came from George Ransome, FLS, a member of the Quaker Ransome family of Ipswich and younger brother of (James) Allen Ransome. The Ransome engineering industry helped to build the town's industrial prosperity in the early 19th century. All political complexions became involved in the common aim of social improvement through the museum, and over sixty leading scientists lent their support as honorary members or vice-presidents.

=== The presidency of John Stevens Henslow, 1850–1861 ===
During these first years the museum gained national repute under its second president (1850–61), Revd Professor John Stevens Henslow, who had been Charles Darwin's mentor at Cambridge University. In 1851 the British Association for the Advancement of Science met at Ipswich, and the museum was inspected and greatly admired by HRH Prince Albert, who became its official Patron.

The natural history displays, including many specimens still on show, were set up in the years preceding the publication of Darwin's book The Origin of Species, to show the relation of the various parts of the natural kingdom as it was then understood, and as it was about to be transformed. Many of the honorary members who actually attended museum functions at Ipswich were people at the centre of that revolution, including William Jackson Hooker, William Yarrell, William Buckland and John Gould.

Other honorary members gave important lecture series, notably the first popular course of astronomy lectures by Professor George Biddell Airy, lectures on geology by Professors John Stevens Henslow, Adam Sedgwick, Richard Owen, Edward Forbes, and Sir Charles Lyell, and others by William Carpenter, Lyon Playfair, Edwin Lankester, David Ansted, etc. A set of lithograph portraits of honorary members of the Ipswich Museum was produced by Thomas Herbert Maguire.

=== The museum adopted by the corporation, 1853 ===
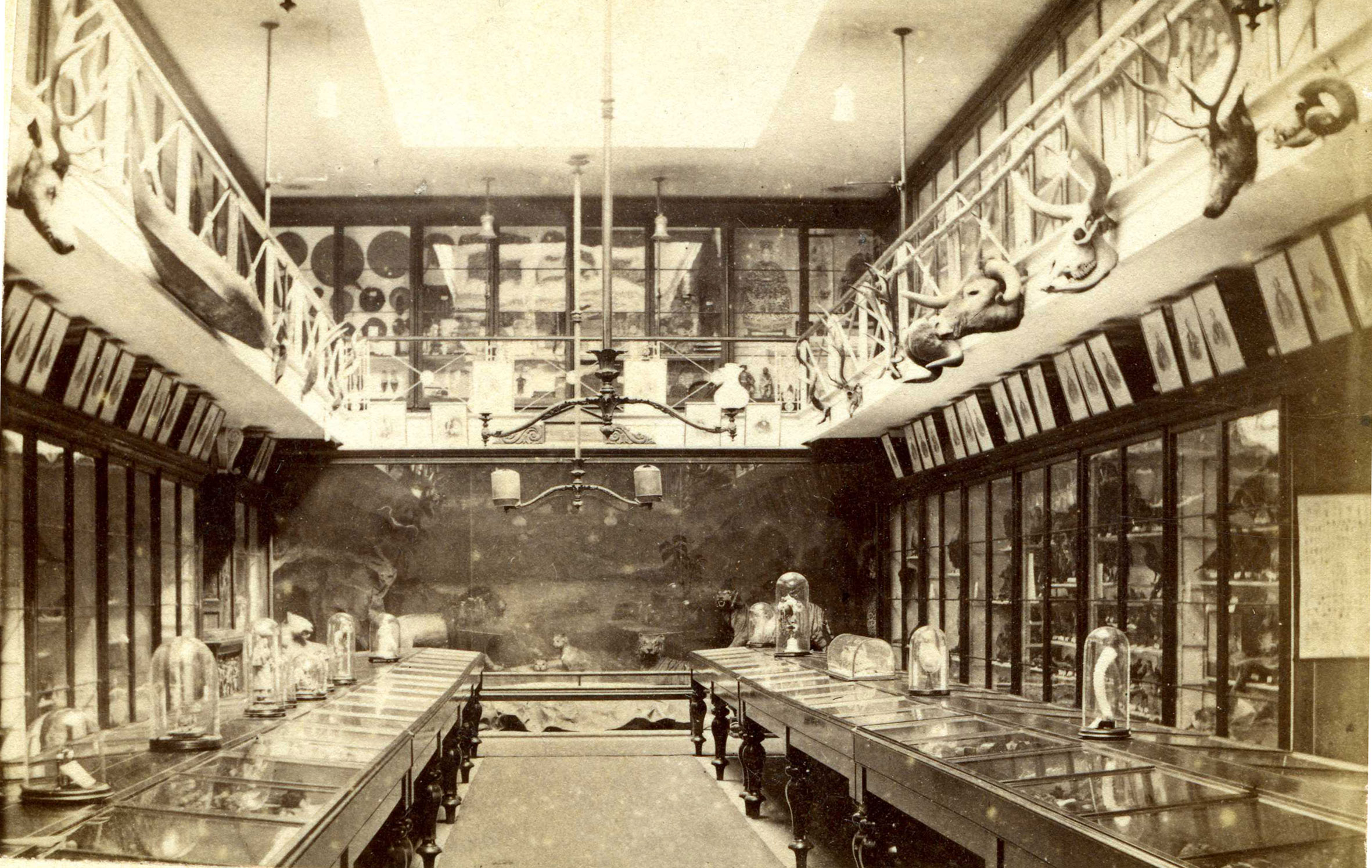
Interior of the old museum, 1875

After a financial collapse in late 1852, a referendum was held in the town which voted overwhelmingly to support the museum through the provisions of the Public Libraries Act 1850. This permitted the levying of a public rate to support such institutions. The collections and properties were formally transferred complete to the Corporation, which retained them in the original premises under the terms of a lease from the builders. Under the new management the terms of public admission were extensively widened. Henslow remained president and continued to develop the collections actively until 1861. A new curator, George Knights, was appointed on the resignation of David Wooster in 1853.

After Henslow's death in 1861, soon after the great confrontation concerning Evolution between Bishop Samuel Wilberforce and Thomas Huxley at Oxford at which Henslow presided, his curator George Knights maintained the collections until his death in 1872.

=== The curatorship of Dr John Ellor Taylor FLS, FGS, 1872–1893 ===
George Knights was succeeded by Dr John Ellor Taylor (1837–1895), FLS, FGS, botanist and geologist. With the help of Edward Packard, founder of the Packard and Fison fertiliser industry, Taylor created what Sir Ray Lankester considered to be the finest representative collections of local geology in the country. Dr Taylor was also editor of the national popular science journal "Hardwicke's Science Gossip Magazine", and leading light of the Ipswich Science Gossip Society (1869), which under his guidance became the Ipswich Scientific Society (1875). He had founded the equivalent Society in Norwich in 1870 and was a co-founder of the Norfolk Geological Society.

Taylor advocated the possibilities of coal-mining in Suffolk, and gave lectures (free to the working classes) to audiences of up to 500, giving 20 lectures each season from 1872 to 1893. He also made a lecture-tour of Australia in 1885, and wrote several popular books including 'Half-Hours at the Seaside', 'Half-Hours in Green Lanes' and the celebrated title 'The Sagacity and Morality of Plants'. His work contributed very largely to public education in Ipswich.

=== The new museum, opened 1881 ===
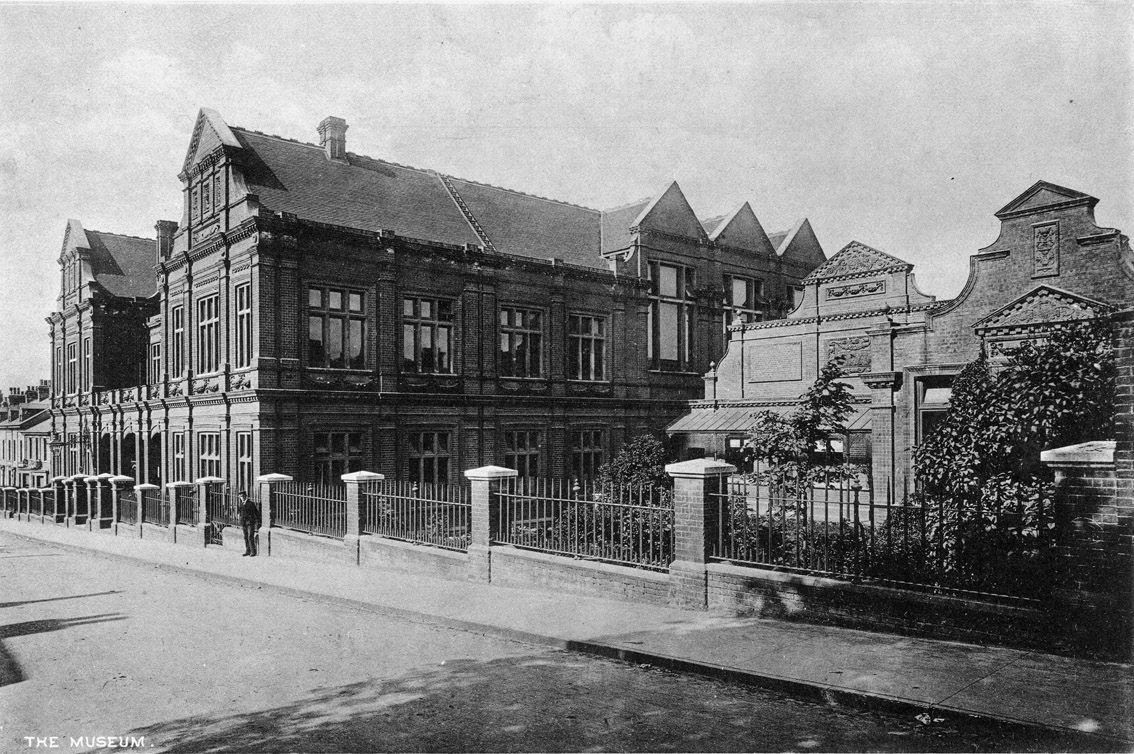
The new museum c 1890

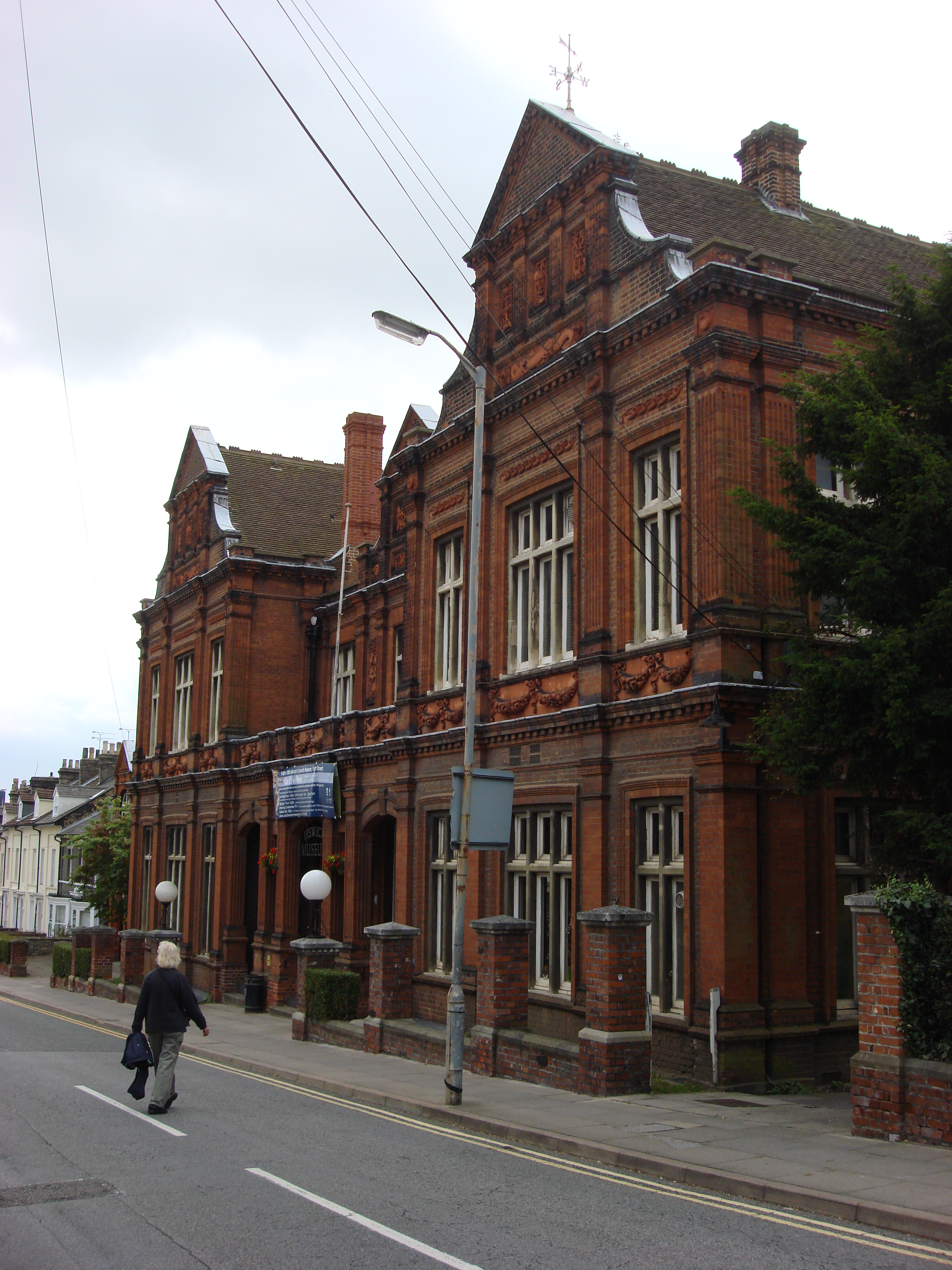
Ipswich Museum (photo 2007)

By 1880 the collections and uses of the museum had so far expanded that it was found desirable to build new premises to house both the museum itself and the Schools of Art and Science which were maintained by the corporation. The project was undertaken with the help of public subscription, and was largely sponsored by Suffolk county benefactors but with many smaller contributions from Ipswich townsfolk. The principal sponsor was the museum's then president Sir Richard Wallace of Sudbourne Hall, Suffolk, creator of the famous art collection at Hertford House.

Under Taylor's management the transfer was completed in 1881, and the original 1846 building later became a dance hall known as the Arlington Ballroom. The building is now a brasserie style restaurant, still retaining the hall and balcony. The new museum incorporated a hall with balconies, fitted with the original cabinets and lion case. Further expansion on the site, including an art gallery, new rooms for the schools, and extensive new galleries were completed between 1890 and 1900, and the Borough's floating debt on the project was extinguished by the generosity of Mrs Margaret Ogilvie of Sizewell Hall out of appreciation for Taylor's work.

=== The curatorship of Frank Woolnough, 1893–1920 ===
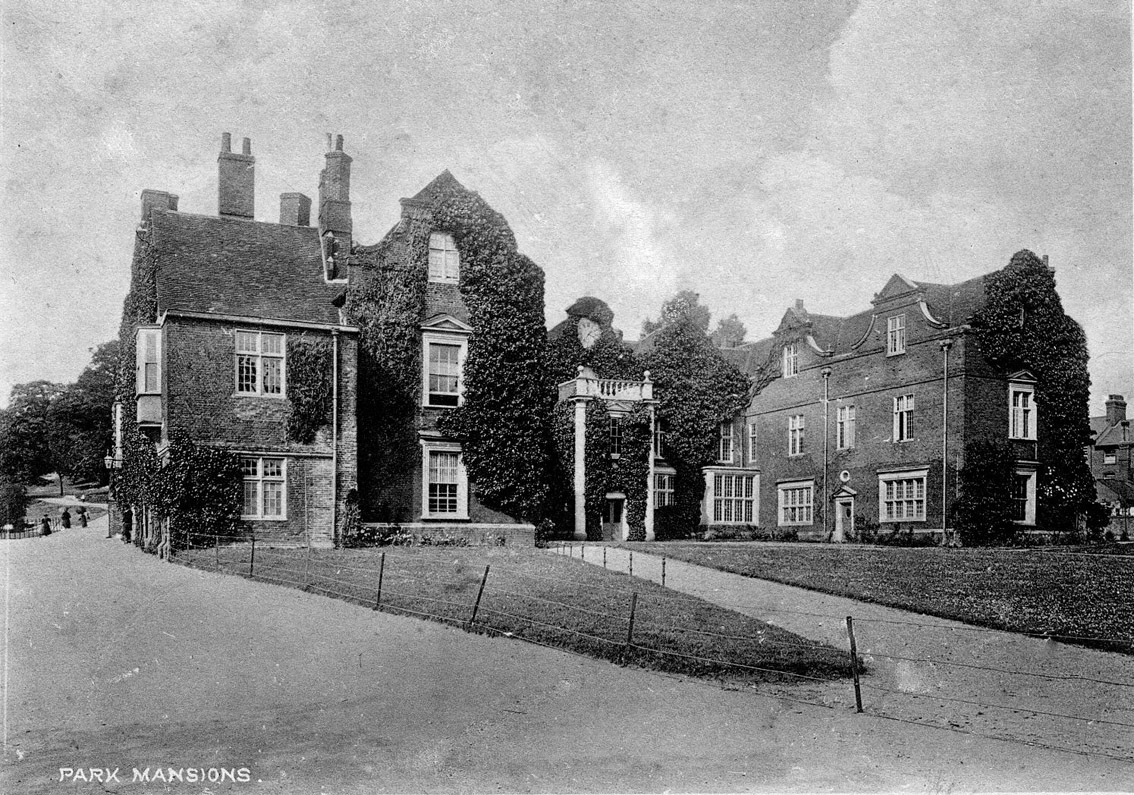
Christchurch Mansion in around 1890

Dr. Taylor died bankrupt in 1895 and his friend Frank Woolnough (1845–1930) succeeded him as Curator 1893–1920. In 1895 the Tudor house in the park on the north side of Ipswich, Christchurch Mansion (built for Edmund Withypoll in 1548–1550), was given to the town by Felix Cobbold and eventually became the art and local history department of the Borough's Museums. Woolnough made himself a polymath and developed both departments of the museum and also the Schools with great vigour. He was also active in the Museums Association, securing Congress visits in 1908 and 1916, and was local Secretary for the Ipswich Congresses of the British Association for the Advancement of Science of 1895 and of the Royal Archaeological Institute in 1899.

Prehistoric archaeology owed a special debt to Suffolk since it was at Hoxne during the 1790s that John Frere recognised humanly-worked flints together with the remains of extinct animals, and the general realisation of the greater antiquity of humankind first began. The Prehistoric Society of East Anglia was created in 1908, centred at Norwich and Ipswich Museums, then the only Society dedicated specifically to this study. Interest developed strongly at Ipswich. The Ipswich investigator James Reid Moir became very active in all the Suffolk county societies and in the museum, encouraged by his mentor Sir Ray Lankester, who was museum president 1901–29.

At the same time archaeology of various periods (but especially the Prehistoric) in Ipswich and East Anglia was strongly developed by Nina Frances Layard (1853–1935), who in 1920–21 was among the first women admitted as Fellows of the Society of Antiquaries of London. She was also the first woman president of the Prehistoric Society, and in the second year of lady Fellows admitted to the Linnean Society (1906). She maintained a long collaboration with Ipswich Museum and bequeathed most of her collections to it.

An important acquisition of this time was the collection of stuffed British birds presented by the Ogilvie family in 1918. Collected in Suffolk and Scotland, they represent the long collaboration of Fergus Menteith Ogilvie (1861–1918) with the Norwich taxidermist Thomas Gunn. This large collection, still intact, on display and in good condition, has extremely beautiful simulated habitats and is now a rare survival. Woolnough also acquired gorillas shot by Paul du Chaillu, a stuffed giraffe in glass case, and an overstuffed rhino (known variously as 'Gladys' or 'Rosie' by generations of Ipswich schoolchildren), and he completely re-stocked the former lion case with African animals obtained from Messrs Rowland Ward Ltd. Another noted acquisition was a collection of Western Australian aboriginal material acquired from Emile Clement.

=== The curatorship of Guy Maynard, 1920–1952 ===
Frank Woolnough was succeeded by Guy Maynard (1877–1966), previously of Saffron Walden Museum, who was curator from 1920 to 1953. Maynard was Secretary and Editor of the Prehistoric Society from 1921 to 1936, when this role was taken over by the Cambridge archaeologist Charles Phillips. Maynard and Reid Moir made a team interested in archaeology and developed this work strongly on behalf of the museum, excavating in various parts of Suffolk. Museum assistants Harold Spencer and Francis Simpson became specialised in geology and natural history from the 1920s, evolving a departmental structure for the museum through their work and publications with the Suffolk Naturalists' Society and the Ipswich and District Natural History Society. Reports of archaeological work went to the Suffolk Institute of Archaeology Proceedings, of which both Reid Moir and Maynard were officers.

Reid Moir succeeded Lankester as president until his death in 1944, and through international contacts developed representative collections of implements from most sites published by the Prehistoric Society. Although some of his theories and researches have since been abandoned he was held in high regard by many of his scientific contemporaries. He was elected a Fellow of the Royal Society in 1937.

Guy Maynard continued Woolnough's work in the area of Fine and Applied Art and Local History assiduously. After the Gainsborough Centenary Exhibition of 1928 a strategy to develop collections showing the Suffolk context of the work of Thomas Gainsborough and John Constable was carried forward. Active in the Suffolk Preservation Society, Maynard rescued what he could from the disappearing timber structures of Ipswich, modernised the museum records, developed photographic records of Ipswich, maintained annual abstracts of archaeological work in the county, and enormously extended the collections of regional artefacts of all kinds.

After 1934 the museum's work in practical archaeology became centred on the employment of Basil Brown (1888–1977), who with Guy Maynard first conducted three years' investigation of a Roman villa at Stanton Chair in Suffolk. The museum was approached to release Brown for part of 1938 and 1939 to investigate the Sutton Hoo mounds for Mrs Pretty, under the museum's guidance. In the second year he made the astounding discovery of the ship and its treasure in Mound 1, at which point the national interest of the find led to the formation of an external team led by Charles Phillips.

During World War II Guy Maynard had the responsibility of packing up the most valuable collections and transferring them into safe storage, and afterwards of reinstating them. On Reid Moir's death in 1944 he was succeeded as president by Sir Charles Sherrington. Basil Brown was re-employed until the 1960s and continued his work throughout the county, building the basis of the county's Sites and Monuments Record. This was latterly under the curatorship of Norman Smedley (1953–1964), who afterwards formalised the archaeological role for Miss Elizabeth Owles.

=== List of honorary presidents of Ipswich Museum ===
- The Revd. William Kirby, 1847–50
- The Revd. Professor John Stevens Henslow, 1850–1861
- Charles Austin of Brandeston Hall, 1861–1874 (High Steward of Ipswich 1849–1874)
- Sir Richard Wallace, Bt of Sudbourne Hall, 1874–1890 (High Steward of Ipswich 1882–1884)
- Sterling Westhorp
- Edward Packard senr., 1895–1899
- Sir Ray Lankester, 1901–1921
- James Reid Moir, F.R.S., 1921–1944
- Sir Charles Sherrington, 1944–1952
- Anna Airy
- John Gathorne-Hardy, 4th Earl of Cranbrook.

Since the mid-1970s no further appointments have been made.

== Recent organisation ==
Through a succession of post-War curators (Norman Smedley, Patricia Butler, Alf Hatton, Sara Muldoon and Tim Heyburn) the museum has passed into a more contemporary pattern of staffing which has varied in number and roles according to perceived priorities and financial restraints of different times. Local Government Reorganisation in 1974 merged the two counties of East and West Suffolk. Practical Archaeology then became the function of the new Suffolk County Council Field Archaeology Unit, which also houses the Sites and Monuments Record. The museum's former link with the Ipswich Art School and the Library Service was also severed as they were transferred to the County Council. The useful honorary office of president was discontinued during the 1970s.

== Merger with Colchester Museum Service, 2007 ==
In the first constitutional change since the public discussion and vote of 1853, on 1 April 2007 the Ipswich Borough Council Museums Service was merged with that of Colchester Borough Council (Essex), under the curatorship of Peter Berridge, and its staff were transferred to the employment of Colchester. The building and collections, however, remain the property of the town of Ipswich, the Borough being responsible for 50% of funding. Ipswich Museum continues to be part of Colchester + Ipswich Museums (CIMS).

CIMS has retained Collections and Learning Curators, Collections Information and Conservation Officers in Ipswich to look after Ipswich Museum, Christchurch Mansion and Ipswich Art Gallery alongside the Visitors Services team. The Exhibitions and Business Support teams work across both towns. The Museum Service is overseen by the Joint Museums Committee, composed of councillors from Ipswich Borough and Colchester Borough Councils.

== Renovation ==
As of 2022 the museum is undertaking a major redevelopment project, budgeted at £8.7 million. The Victorian Society, a registered charity founded in 1958, has objected to preliminary visualisations of the interior as betraying the historical character of the space. However, officers of the museum "have reassured heritage conservationalists that it will preserve the Victorian ambiance of its Natural History Gallery." In January 2026 it was announced that the re-opening was planned for late of 2026 and costs were up to £11.4m. In March 2026 this increased to £12.3 million with a planned re-opening towards the start of 2027.

== Holdings ==
The Ipswich Hoard, found near Belstead in 1968, is now in the British Museum, but there are also copies of these torcs in this museum.

== Popular culture ==
The 1956 Rayant Pictures film The Secret of the Forest was a children's film featuring four children thwarting the attempt of some robbers to steal a golden cup. Some footage was taken in Ipswich Museum. The 2021 Netflix film The Dig follows the story of archeologist Basil Brown discovering the Sutton Hoo ship-burial. Brown, an employee of the museum, is regularly mentioned throughout the film and makes a brief appearance, although the actual museum was not used during filming.
