= Portrait of Abram Constable =

Painting by John Constable

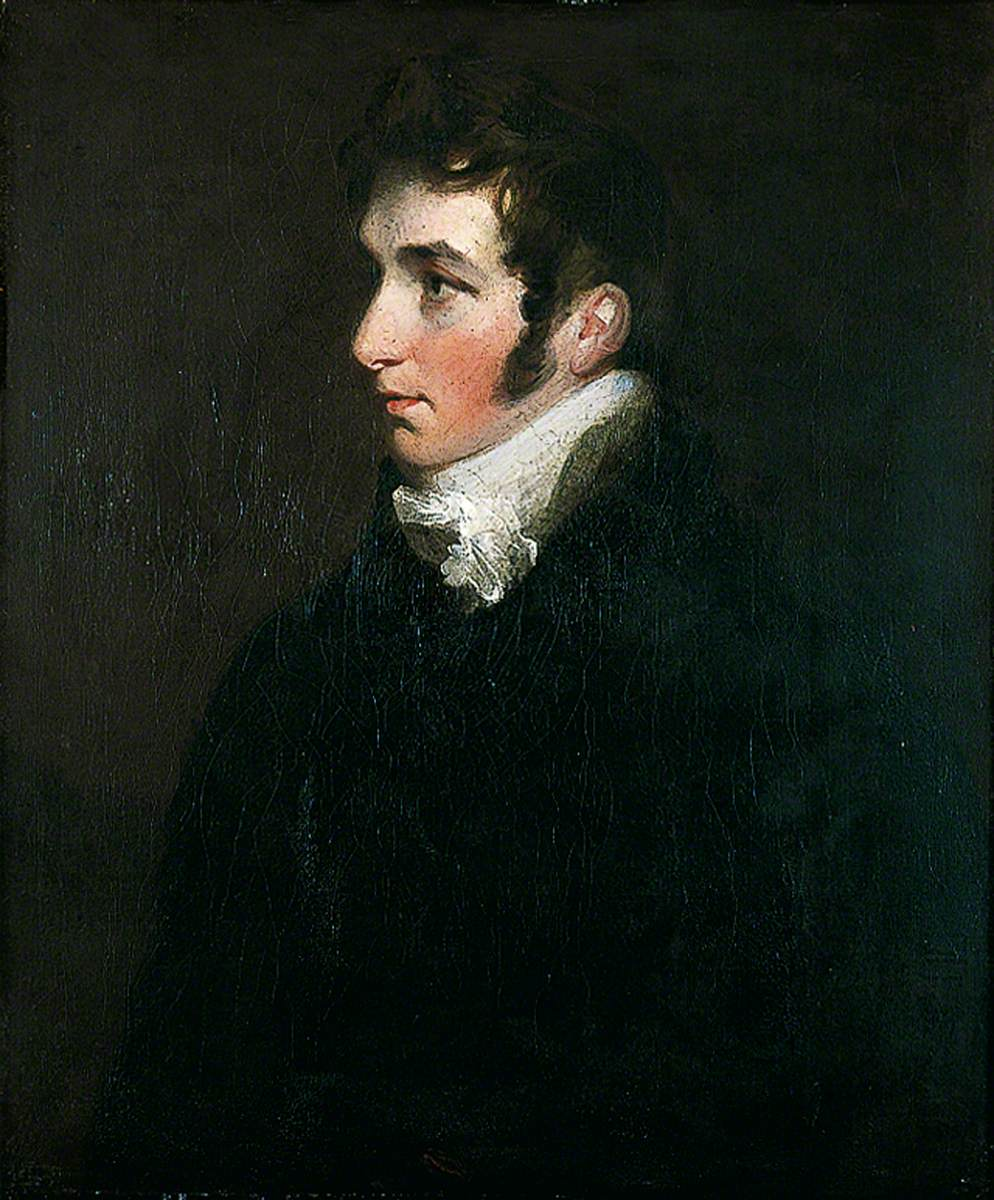
- Artist: John Constable
- Year: c.1806
- Type: Oil on canvas, portrait painting
- Dimensions: 76.2 cm × 63.5 cm (30.0 in × 25.0 in)
- Location: Christchurch Mansion, Ipswich

Portrait of Abram Constable is c.1806 portrait painting by the British artist John Constable. It depicts his younger brother Abram, the manager of Flatford Mill in southern Suffolk on the border with Essex, the area now known as Constable Country. He is shown at half-length looking sideways and dressed in the style of the early Regency era. John Constable had grown up as the son of a prosperous mill owner. While John was pressured by his father to take over the mill's management, he rejected the life of a miller to pursue his career as an artist, ultimately becoming celebrated for his Romantic landscape paintings. But at the time he painted his brother his career largely revolved around producing portraits of the family's wealthier neighbours in the area.

The painting was not submitted to the exhibitions at the Royal Academy or British Institution as it was a private, personal family work. It was acquired for the collection of the Christchurch Mansion in Ipswich in 1925. In 2020 a rediscovered preparatory pencil sketch for the portrait of Abram was auctioned at Sotheby's.

== See also ==
- List of paintings by John Constable

== Bibliography ==
- Bailey, Anthony. John Constable: A Kingdom of his Own. Random House, 2012.
- Gayford, Martin & Lyles, Anne. Constable Portraits: The Painter and His Circle. National Portrait Gallery, 2009.
- Roodhouse, Emma. Constable 250: A Cast of Characters. Amberley Publishing, 2026.
