= Golding Constable's Vegetable Garden =

Painting by John Constable

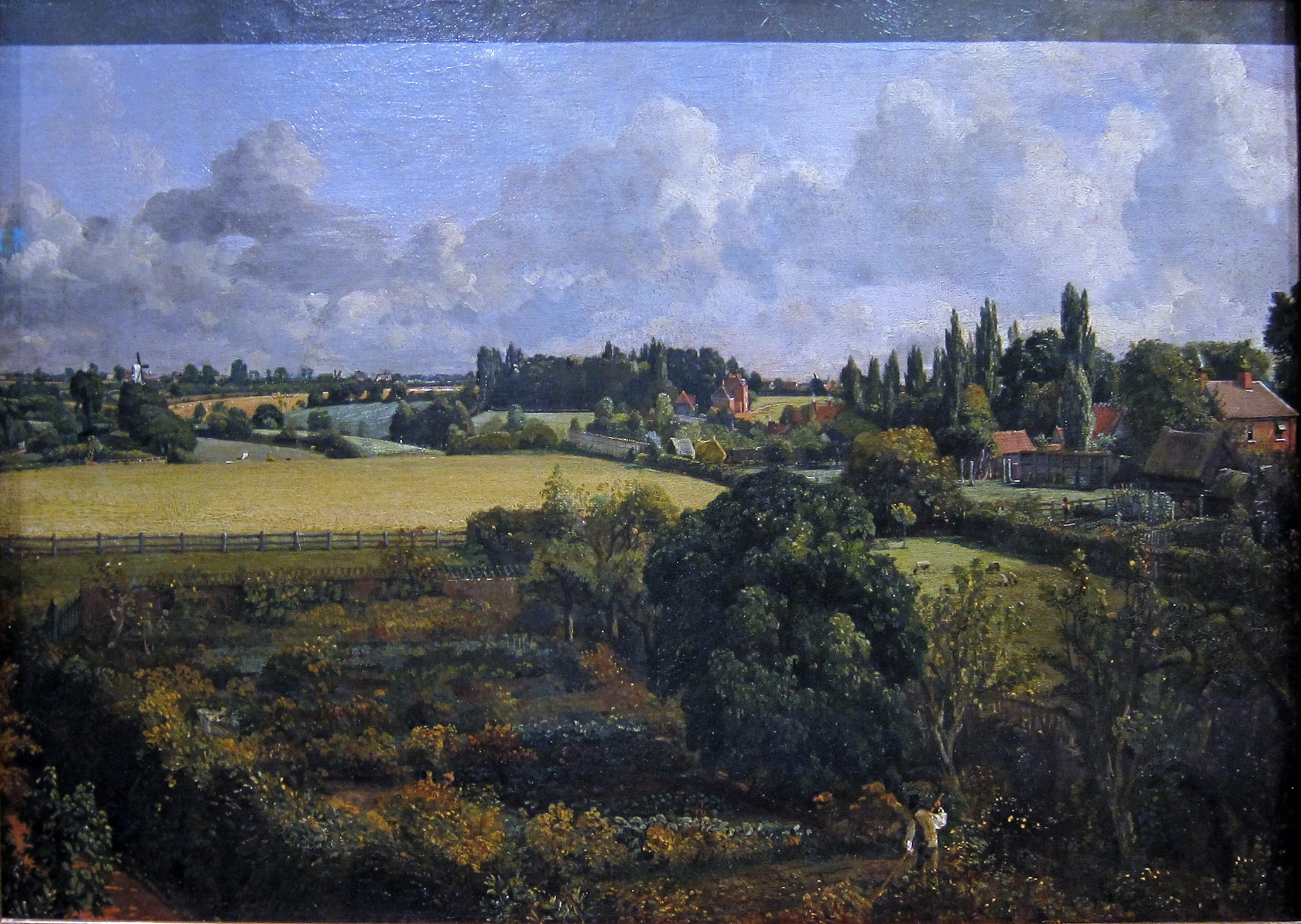
Golding Constable's Vegetable Garden, painted 1815

Golding Constable's Vegetable Garden is an oil-on-canvas painting executed in 1815 by the English artist John Constable. The work shows the vegetable garden belonging to Constable's father, Golding Constable, who lived in the Suffolk village of East Bergholt.

It was intended for Constable's private collection. It formed a pair with the painting Golding Constable's Flower Garden and hangs with it in Christchurch Mansion in Ipswich.

== See also ==
- List of paintings by John Constable
