= Holywells Park (painting) =

Painting by Thomas Gainsborough

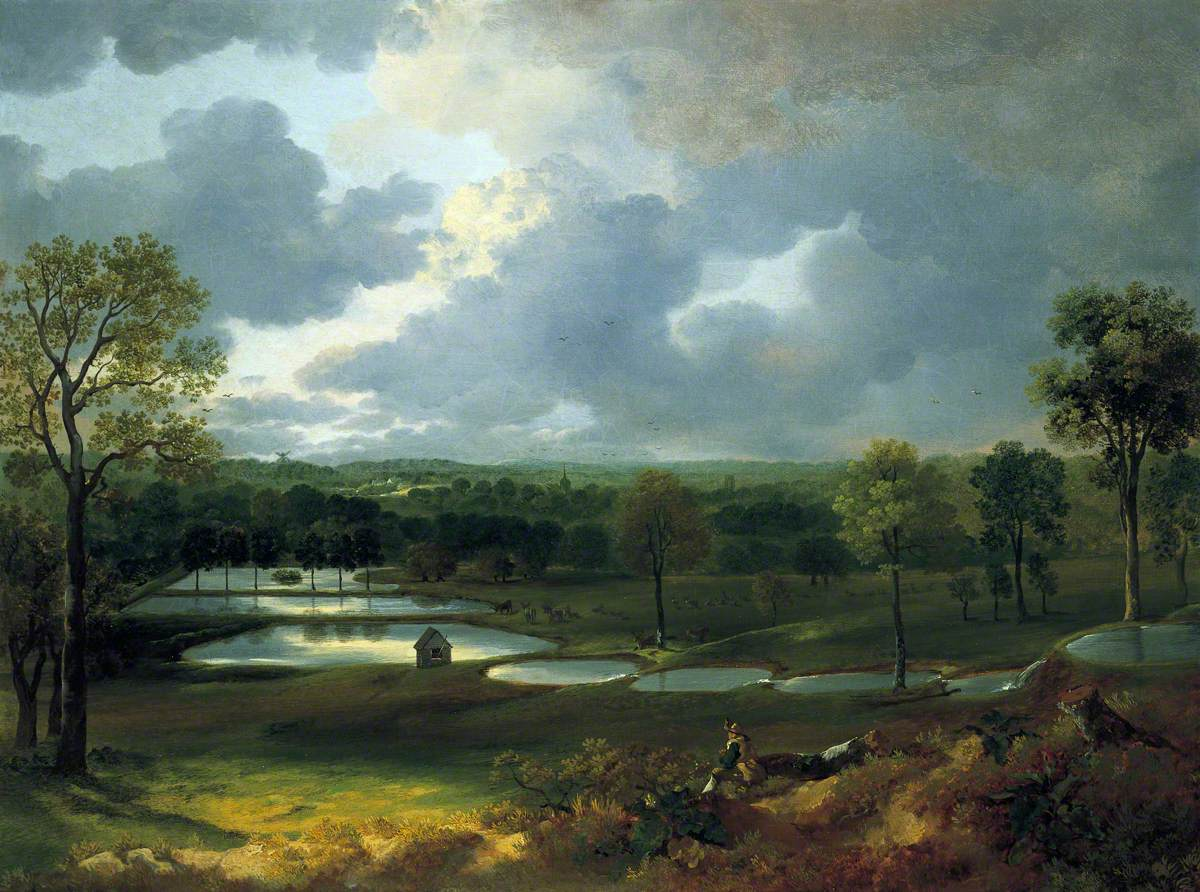
- Artist: Thomas Gainsborough
- Year: 1748-50
- Type: Oil on canvas, landscape painting
- Dimensions: 50.8 cm × 66 cm (20.0 in × 26 in)
- Location: Christchurch Mansion, Ipswich

Holywells Park, Ipswich is a c.1750 landscape painting by the British artist Thomas Gainsborough. It depicts a panoramic view of what is now Holywells Park in Ipswich. When he painted the scene it was outside the town and was commissioned by the brewer Thomas Cobbold whose beer included fresh water from the location. On the horizon are the Stoke Windmill which Gainsborough frequently sketched. Given it includes several reservoirs uses to produce water for brewing, it shows a semi-industrial landscape that is unusual in his work.

The picture was produced during the time the Suffolk-born Gainsborough lived and worked in Ipswich before his move to the fashionable spa resort of Bath in 1759. It is his only known picture of the town. The painting is now part of the collection of Christchurch Mansion in Ipswich, having been acquired in 1992 for £375, 000 with the assistance of several groups including the Art Fund.

== Bibliography ==
- Postle, Martin. Thomas Gainsborough. Tate, 2002.
- Rao, Eleonora, Chialant, Maria Teresa & Bottalico, Michele. Literary Landscapes, Landscape in Literature. Carocci, 2007.
- Roe, Sonia. Oil Paintings in Public Ownership in Suffolk. Public Catalogue Foundation, 2005.
- Roodhouse, Emma. Constable 250: A Cast of Characters. Amberley Publishing, 2026.
