= Thomas Essington =

English businessperson and landowner

Sir Thomas Essington (ca 1609-1673) was an English businessman and landowner. Like his father before him he was both Warden and Master of the Drapers Livery Company in the City of London. He became a landowner particularly in Suffolk. He owned the manor of Brightwell and the estate which was to become Holywells Park, Ipswich.
