= A Country Cart Crossing the Ford =

Painting by Thomas Gainsborough

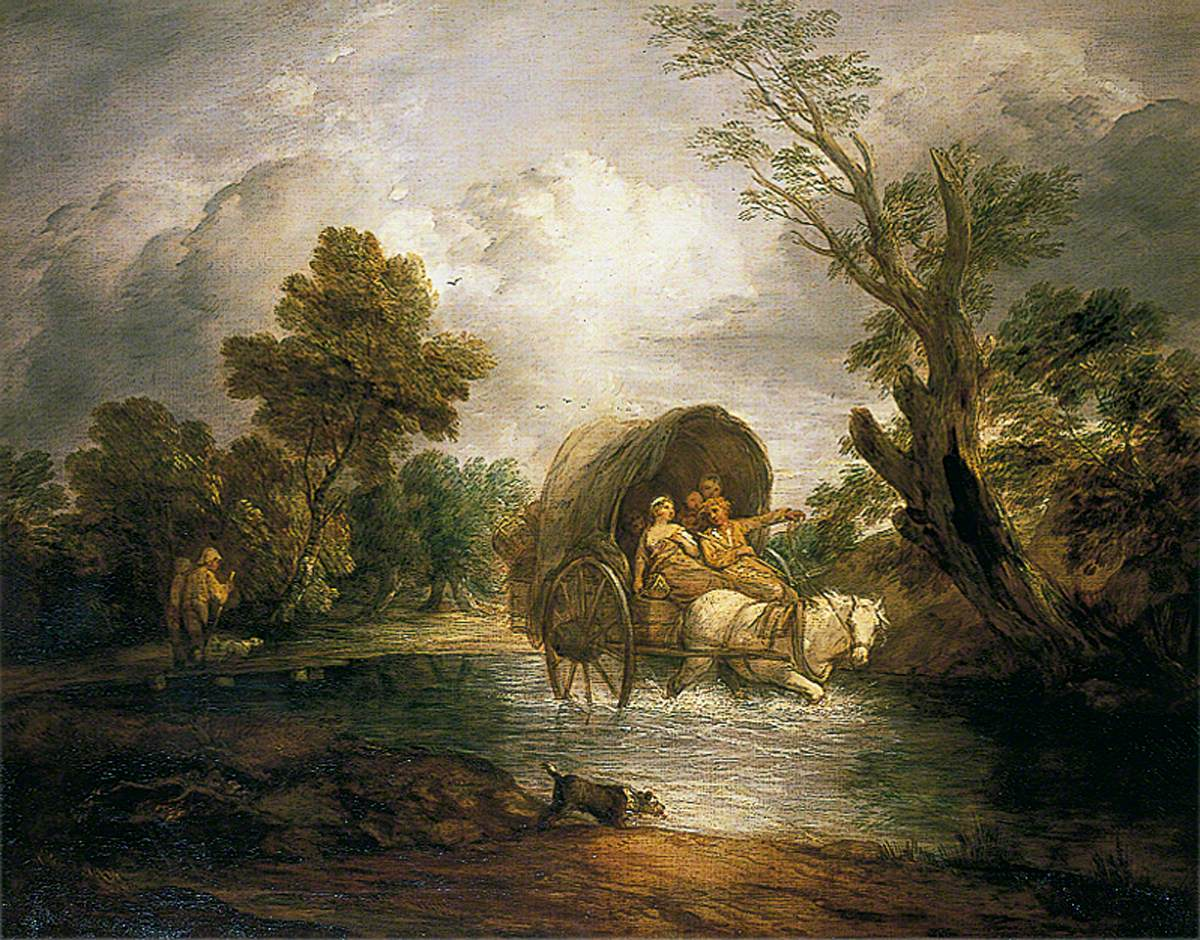
- Artist: Thomas Gainsborough
- Year: c.1786
- Type: Oil on canvas, landscape painting
- Dimensions: 98 cm × 124 cm (39 in × 49 in)
- Location: Christchurch Mansion, Ipswich

A Country Cart Crossing the Ford is a 1786 landscape painting by the British artist Thomas Gainsborough. It shows a rural scene, with a cart crossing a ford. Many of these Romantic landscapes create an imagined view rather than being specifically based on real locations in his native Suffolk.

The painting was produced late in the artist's career. By this point he had stopped displaying at the Royal Academy with whom he had fallen out and instead exhibited his pictures at his studio at Schomberg House in Pall Mall. The painting is now in the collection of Christchurch Mansion in Ipswich, having been acquired in 1983 through the assistance of various groups including the Art Fund.

== Bibliography ==
- Hermann, Luke. British Landscape Painting of the Eighteenth Century. Oxford University Press, 1974.
- Roe, Sonia. Oil Paintings in Public Ownership in Suffolk. Public Catalogue Foundation, 2005.
- Spencer-Longhurst, Paul & Brooke, Janet M. Thomas Gainsborough: The Harvest Wagon. Birmingham Museums and Art Gallery, 1995
