= Frank Woolnough =

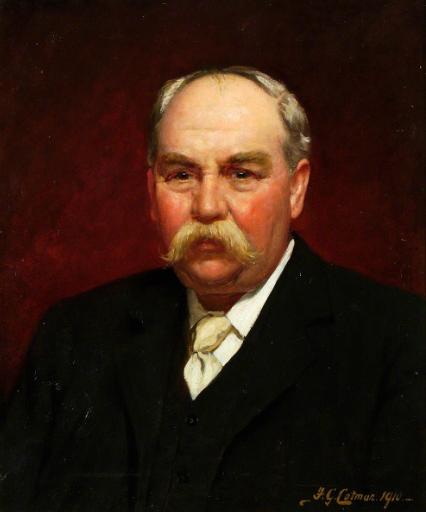
Frank Woolnough, portrait by Frederick George Cotman, 1910

Frank Woolnough (1845–1930) was the curator of Ipswich Museum from 1893–1920. He also published material under the pseudonym Felix Walton.

In A History of Ipswich Museum he wrote:

"A curator tries to leave behind him true records for those who come after him to take up and carry on the work so that development and knowledge may grow hand in hand."

Woolnough was also the first curator of Christchurch Mansion, preparing it for public access.

He was active in the Unitarian Church until 1913 when he retired from the local committee when it admitted women to its ranks.

== Publications ==
- "History of Ipswich Museum", Museums Journal, 8(6), 191– 200 (1908)
- (Felix Walton):Souvenir of the bi-centenary of the Cliff Brewery 1723–1923 (1923)
- (Felix Walton):Guide To Ipswich And Neighbourhood Ipswich: W. E. Harrison, The Ancient House Press (1922)
