= Golding Constable's Flower Garden =

Painting by John Constable

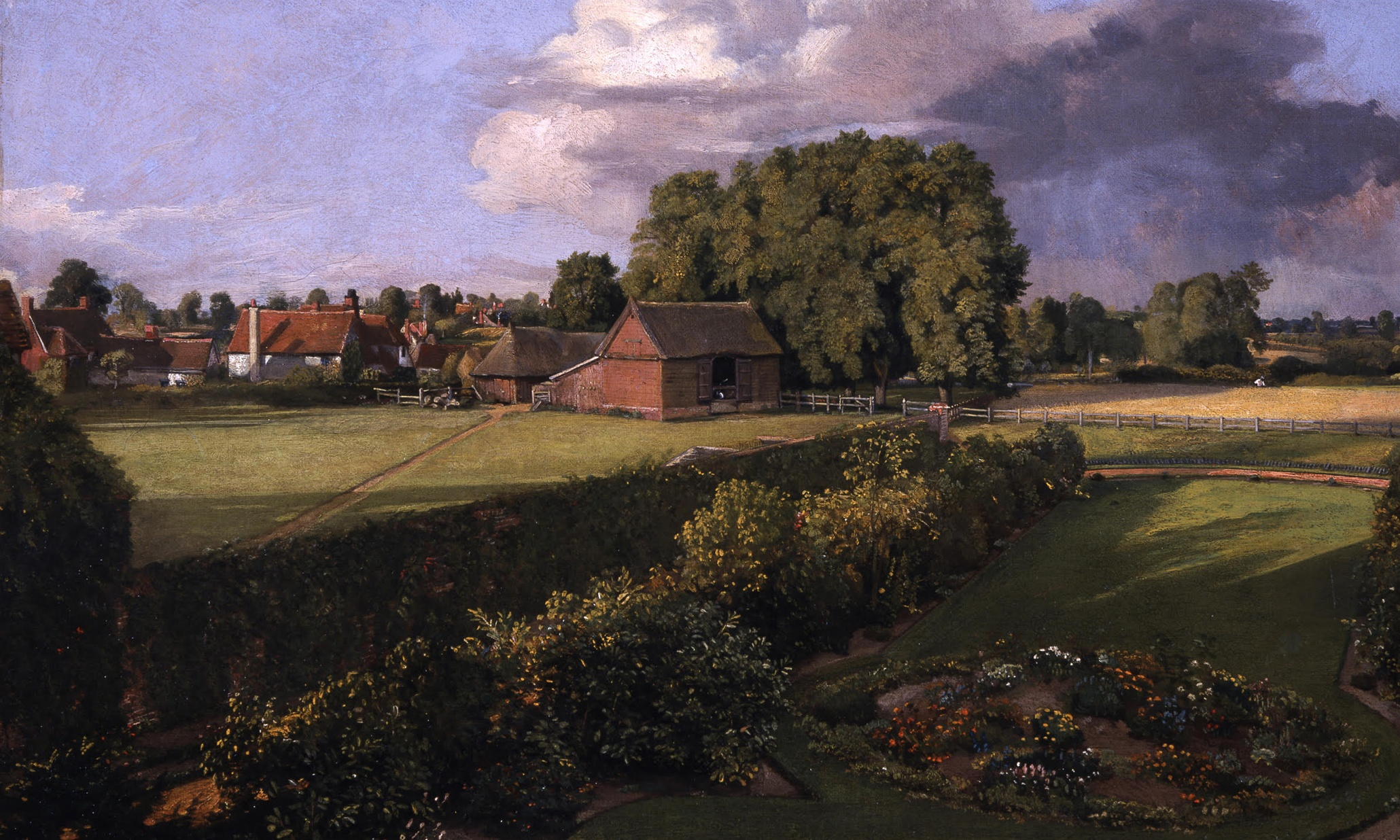
Golding Constable's Flower Garden (1815) by John Constable

Golding Constable's Flower Garden is an oil-on-canvas painting by the English artist John Constable, created in 1815. The work shows the flower garden belonging to Constable's father, Golding Constable, who lived in the Suffolk village of East Bergholt.

The painting was donated by Ernest Cook, the grandson of the pioneering travel agent Thomas Cook, who left his art collection to the Art Fund, which distributed it to nearly a hundred British galleries. It is currently in Christchurch Mansion, which is near East Bergholt. It formed a pair with the painting Golding Constable's Vegetable Garden and hangs beside it.

The two paintings were painted after Constable's mother had died after falling ill in one of the gardens and when his father was seriously ill. The gardens were demolished after the family home was sold in 1839.

== See also ==
- List of paintings by John Constable
