= Stanton Chare =

Hamlet in Suffolk, England

Coordinates: 52.3336°N 0.8774°E

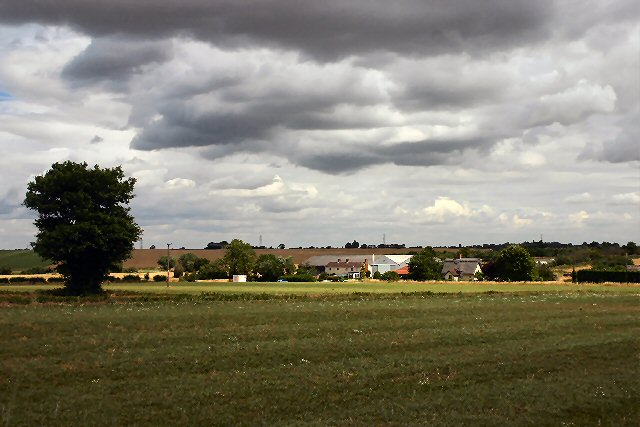

- Location within Suffolk
- Civil parish: Stanton
- District: West Suffolk
- Shire county: Suffolk
- Region: East
- Country: England
- Sovereign state: United Kingdom
- Police: Suffolk
- Fire: Suffolk
- Ambulance: East of England

Stanton Chare is a hamlet in the civil parish of Stanton, in the West Suffolk district, in the county of Suffolk, England. It is near the large village of Stanton. The A143 road and B1111 road are nearby.
