= Harry Becker =

Harry Becker may refer to:

- Harry Becker (artist) (1865–1928), English painter, draughtsman and printer
- Harry Becker (politician) (1892–1980), English politician

== See also ==
- Harry Becher (fl. 1880s–1920s), Irish Anglican priest
