= John Jermy =

Sir John Jermy (ca 1496–1560) was a prominent Suffolk landowner during the Tudor period.

John Jermy was the son of Edmund Jermy (who died in 1506) and Anne Boothe. He became a ward of the Thomas Howard, 2nd Duke of Norfolk, until his uncle, Sir Philip Boothe bought his wardship in 1512. He married Margaret Tay about around 1525, and was knighted at the coronation of Anne Boleyn.

He was buried on 23 November 1560 at St Stephen, Coleman Street, London, an event recorded by the diarist Henry Machyn.
