= Butlins Skegness =

Holiday resort in Skegness, Lincolnshire, England

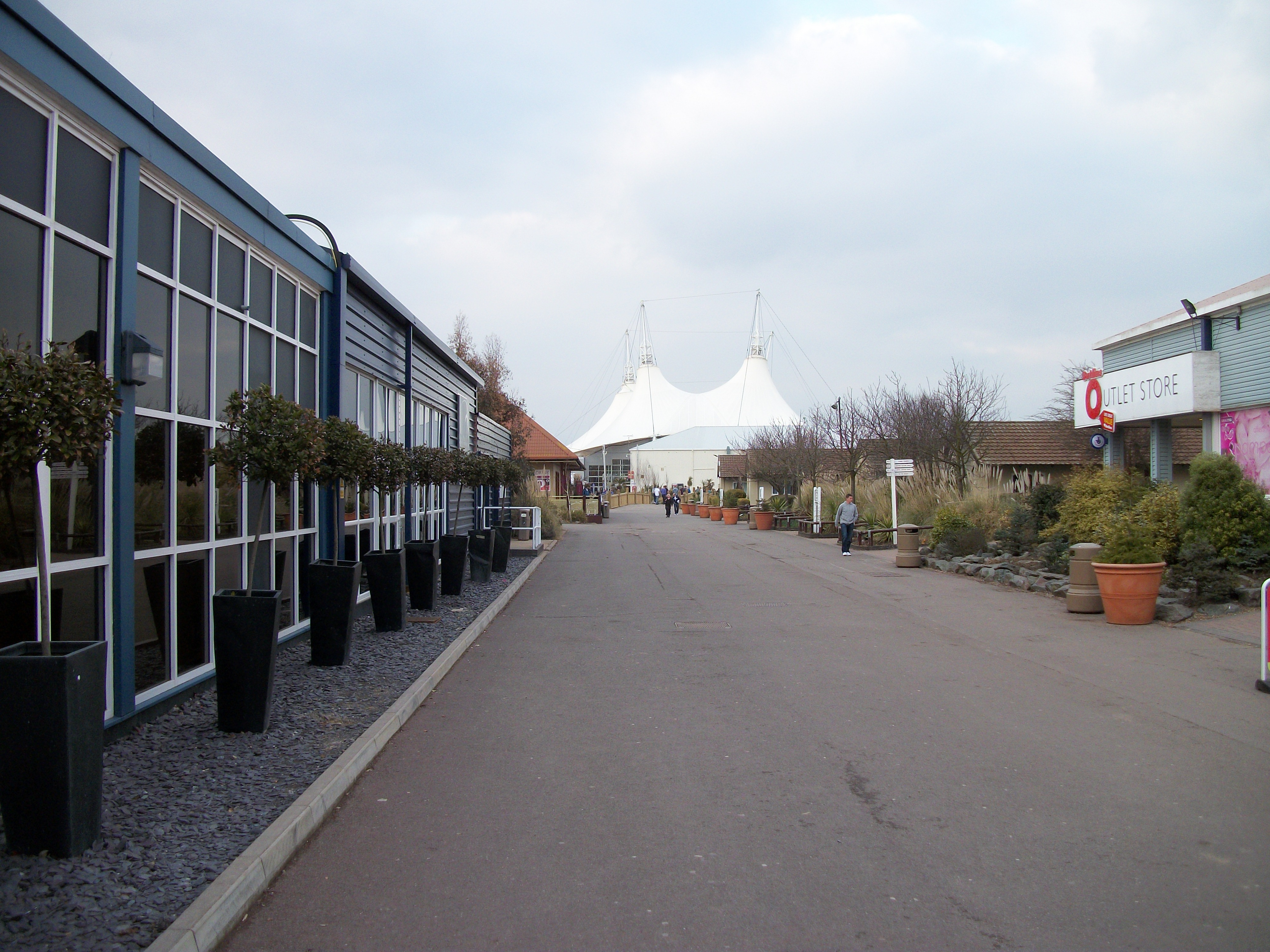
- Butlins Skegness looking toward the Skyline pavilion.

- Location within Lincolnshire
- Location: Ingoldmells, Skegness, Lincolnshire, England
- Coordinates: 53.18°0′0″N 0.35°0′0″E
- Subsequent names: Butlin's Skegness (1936–1987); Funcoast World (1987–1999); Butlins Resort Skegness (1999 – present)
- Type: Resort
- Campus size: 200 acres (81 ha)
- Residences: over 1,000
- Facilities: Amusement Park, Swimming pool
- Established: 11 April 1936
- Website: http://www.butlins.com https://www.butlinsskegnesscaravans.com

Butlins Skegness (officially Butlins Resort Skegness), formerly Butlin's Skegness or Funcoast World, is a holiday camp located in Ingoldmells near Skegness in Lincolnshire, England. Billy Butlin conceived of its creation based on his experiences at a Canadian summer camp in his youth and by observation of the actions of other holiday accommodation providers, both in seaside resort lodging houses and in earlier smaller holiday camps.

Construction of the camp began in 1935 and it was opened in 1936, when it quickly proved to be a success with a need for expansion. The camp included dining and recreation facilities, such as dance halls and sports fields. During World War II the camp was taken over and used by the military, serving as a naval training base, but it reverted to a holiday camp in 1946. Since then, the camp has seen continuous use and development, in the mid-1980s and again in the late 1990s being subject to substantial investment and redevelopment.

In the late 1990s, the site was re-branded as a holiday resort, and remains open today as one of three remaining Butlins resorts.

== Holiday camp conception ==
In 1914, Billy Butlin was living in Toronto with his mother and stepfather, when he left school and began working for Eatons department store. According to Butlin, one of the best aspects of working for the company was that he was able to visit their summer camp which gave him an idea of what would soon become a large part of his life.

The onset of World War I led to his leaving Eatons and enlisting in the Canadian Expeditionary Force serving in Europe, but seeing little if any action. (Note: Dacre 1982, pp.43–45) After the war, Butlin returned to England where he used some of his last £5 (2011:£151.00) to purchase a stall in his uncle Marshall Hill's travelling fair. (Note: Scott 2001, p.6)

As a showman, Butlin ultimately created his own travelling fair. (Note: Dacre 1982, p.72) Butlin soon had fixed fairground sites as well as his travelling fair – the first was at Olympia in London outside Bertram Mills' Circus. In 1925, he opened a set of fairground stalls in Barry Island, Wales where he observed the way landladies in seaside resorts would (sometimes literally) push families out of the lodgings between meals, and began to nurture the idea of a holiday camp similar to the one he had attended whilst an employee at Eatons.

In 1927, Butlin leased a piece of land from the Earl of Scarbrough by the seaside town of Skegness, where he set up an amusement park with hoopla stalls, a tower slide, a haunted house ride and, in 1928, a miniature railway and Dodgem cars—these were the first bumper cars in Britain, as Butlin had an exclusive license to import them.

== Butlin's camp ==
During the early 1930s, Butlin joined the board of Harry Warner's holiday camp company (now Warner Leisure Hotels) and in 1935 he observed the construction of Warner's holiday camp in Seaton, Devon. (Note: Butler, Russell 2010, p.38) Butlin learned from the experience of Warner, and employed the workers who had constructed the Seaton camp to come to Lincolnshire to build his new camp at Skegness.

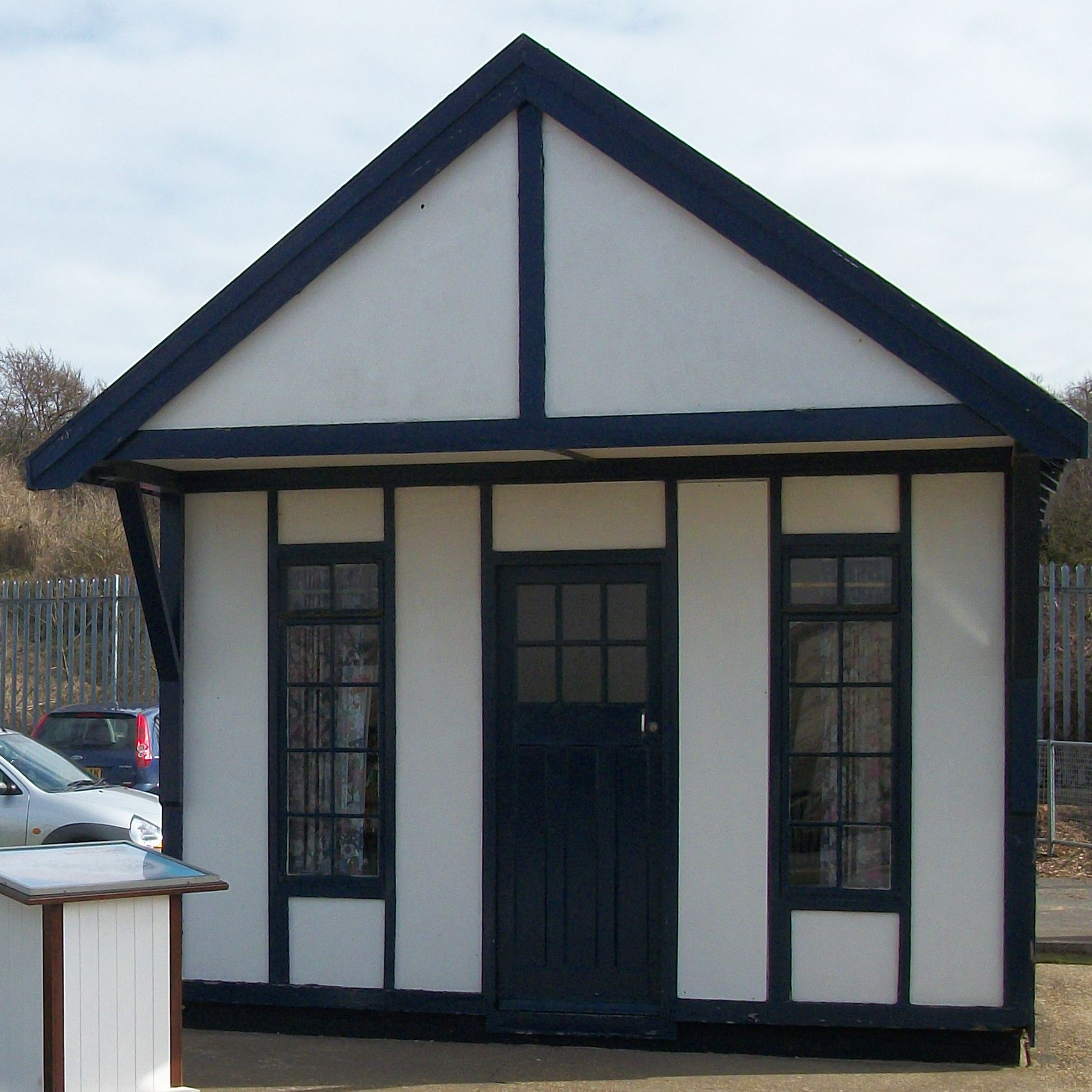
One of Butlin's original chalets preserved and listed in Skegness

Construction began on 4 September 1935; the local paper reported the first sod had been turned. (Note: Scott 2001, p.11) Butlin designed the camp himself and said of the camp, "my plans were for 1,000 people in 600 chalets with electricity, running water, 250 bathrooms, dining and recreational halls. A theatre, a gymnasium, a rhododendron bordered swimming pool with cascades at both ends and a boating lake." However, Butlin hired the architect Harold Ridley Hooper, to draw up the formal plans for the camp buildings. In the camp's landscaped grounds, there were to be tennis courts, bowling and putting greens and cricket pitches. The total cost of the project was £100,000 (2011:£4.16 million) and despite having suffered a financial shortfall during construction, the camp opened on schedule in 1936. One of the original 1936 chalet accommodation units is still present and is now a grade II listed building, recognising its historical significance.

He opened his camp on 11 April 1936 (Easter Even). It was officially opened by Amy Johnson from Hull, who had been the first woman to fly solo from England to Australia. An advertisement costing £500 (2011:£21,000) was placed in the Daily Express, announcing the opening of the camp and inviting the public to book for a week's holiday. The advertisement offered holidays with three meals a day and free entertainment with a week's full board, at a cost of between 35 shillings (£1.75) and £3 (2011:£124.00), according to the time of year. The advert proved successful, and over the first summer season the capacity of the camp had to be increased from 500 to 2,000, to cope with the demand.

When the camp opened, Butlin realised that his guests were not engaging with activities in the way he had envisioned, as most kept to themselves, and others looked bored. He asked Norman Bradford (who was engaged as an engineer constructing the camp) to take on the duty of entertaining the guests which he did with a series of ice breakers and jokes. By the end of the night, the camp was buzzing. From that point on, entertainment was the most significant element of Butlin's and Bradford became the first of the Butlin's Redcoats. That night Butlin decided that for his camp to work he would require an army of people to carry out the same job as Bradford, and the role of Redcoat was created.

In 1938, Butlin gained the contract to supply amusements to the Empire Exhibition in Glasgow. (Note: Scott 2001, p.21) After the exhibition was complete, Butlin returned with some of the infrastructure. His Clacton camp and Sheerness amusement park each received miniature railways, (Note: Scott 2001, p.24) while Skegness received a building in the shape of the "Butlin theatre" which was later renamed the "Gaiety".

Butlin continued to increase the capacity of the camp until 3 September 1939 when the Second World War was declared. The next morning, the campers were sent home and the site was taken over by the Royal Navy for use as a training facility.

== Wartime use ==
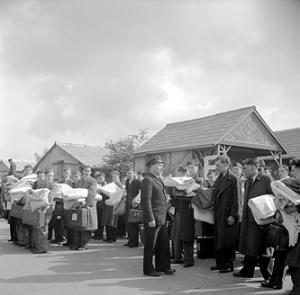
The Petty Officer in charge meets trainee Belgian sailors as they arrive at HMS Royal Arthur

Once the Navy took over, the camp became known as HMS Royal Arthur and was used to train sailors for the war effort. To operate as a military base, many of the bright external colours were overpainted, the dance hall became an armoury, and the rose beds were dug up, to become sites for air raid shelters. (Note: Hailey 2001, p.201)

While the outside was repainted, much of the interior décor continued unchanged. Speaking of his time there, George Melly reported that Royal Arthur had "a certain architectural frivolity inappropriate to a Royal Navy Shore Establishment". Melly mentioned how the main reception still had a sky scene with clouds painted on the ceiling and a large artificial (though realistic) tree in the centre of it. He also observed that their meals were served from an approximation of an Elizabethan inn named "Ye Olde Pigge and Whistle". (Note: Lavery 2009, p.104)

During the war, the German air force bombed Royal Arthur 52 times, including one incident on 21 August 1940 when an attack led to damage or demolition of 900 small buildings. (Note: James, Cox 2000, p.139) By the end of the conflict, the camp had survived in a condition requiring only 6 weeks for wartime damage to be repaired and enabled Butlin to reopen the camp to the public on 11 May 1946. After reopening, some signs of military occupation remained with it being observed the blankets supplied to campers still had the insignia of HMS Royal Arthur. (Note: Donald 2006, p.36)

== Later history ==
In 1947, Butlin had experimented with opening an airfield attached to his camp at Pwllheli. Patrons could fly in, to be collected by a Redcoat and transported to the camp. Flight magazine reported that "flying visitors were unanimous in their praise of what they saw and experienced", observing that the experience contrasted to the poor reputations the camps were being given in the media at the time. Welcoming the experiment as a success, Butlin announced his intention to open airfields at his other camps. The following year he opened his next airfield at Skegness and announced that visitors could fly to the camp on a service run by BEA from 26 June. The airfield also allowed Butlin's to offer services such as pleasure trips and sightseeing trips, as well as allowing private charters.

In 1948, Butlin's also opened the Ingoldmells Hotel, which was situated outside the camp on the main road. In 1949, the hotel became the first in Skegness to have a television for the use of guests. Situated in the hotel's palm court function room, the TV was manufactured by R.G.D. but could be subject to interference from the hotel's refrigerator.

Butlin's had a long history of combining amusements with transport, starting with their first miniature railway at the Empire Exhibition in 1938. Skegness was to receive its own miniature railway in 1962. (Note: Scott 2001, p.53) A chairlift system was installed at the same time. (Note: Scott 2001, p.90) In 1965, the camp became home to the UK's first commercial monorail system. According to Peter Scott, who has researched the history of Butlin's transport systems, Butlin apparently gained the idea for the system from Disneyland. Construction began in 1964 with the cars being manufactured locally; the total cost of the system was £50,000 (2011:£572,457). (Note: Scott 2001, p.91) In 1974, a fire broke out in the kitchens of the Beachcomber Chinese restaurant leading to the complete destruction of the Princes building. In the Ballroom upstairs, a "Miss Personality Competition" was taking place when smoke was first spotted. The Redcoat in Charge of this event and the compère acted quickly, and were able to evacuate the building with no loss of life. To compensate for the loss of the entertainment venue, the fenceline was moved to encompass the Ingoldmells Hotel, which then became another venue.

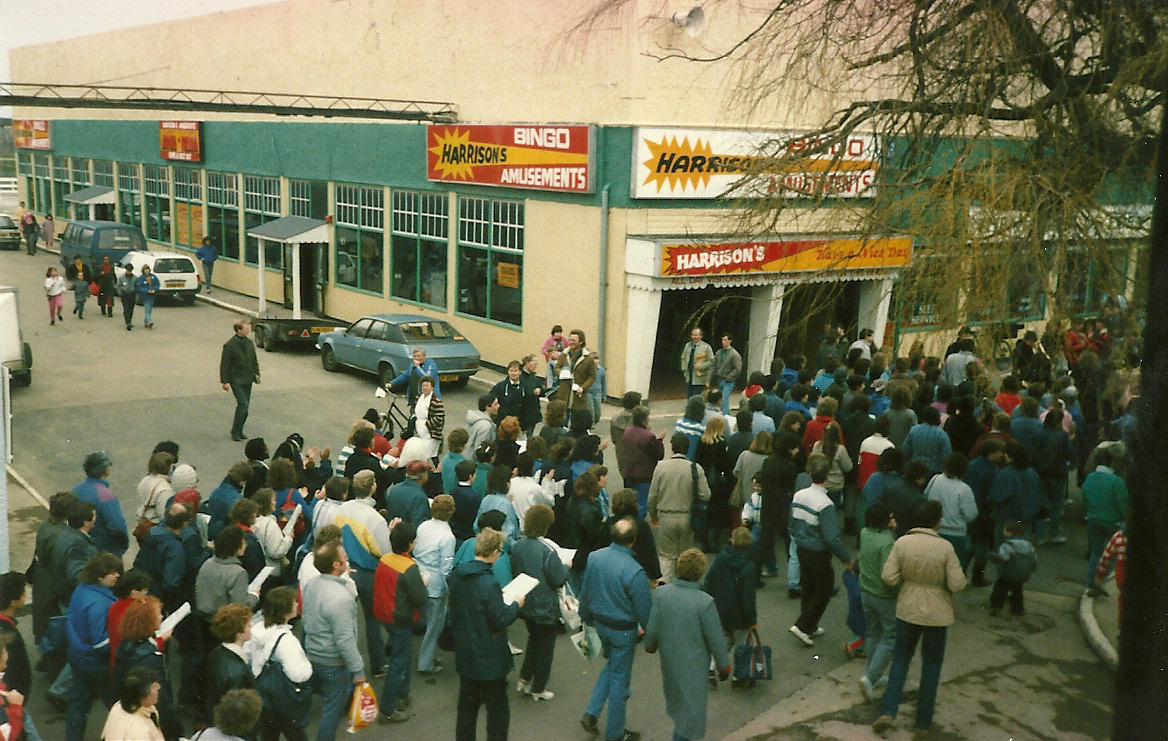
A Spring Harvest parade at Butlins Skegness in the early 1990s

In 1987, the resort benefited from a £14 million (2011:£27.4 million) investment and improvement scheme, following which the resort was known as Funcoast World. Around this time, many of the structures were subject to change with the demolition of many chalets and some central buildings including the Windsor dining hall and Empire theatre. The 1980s saw the removal of the miniature railway and chairlift system, but also saw the construction of a new indoor swimming pool named the Funsplash and an outdoor fun pool.

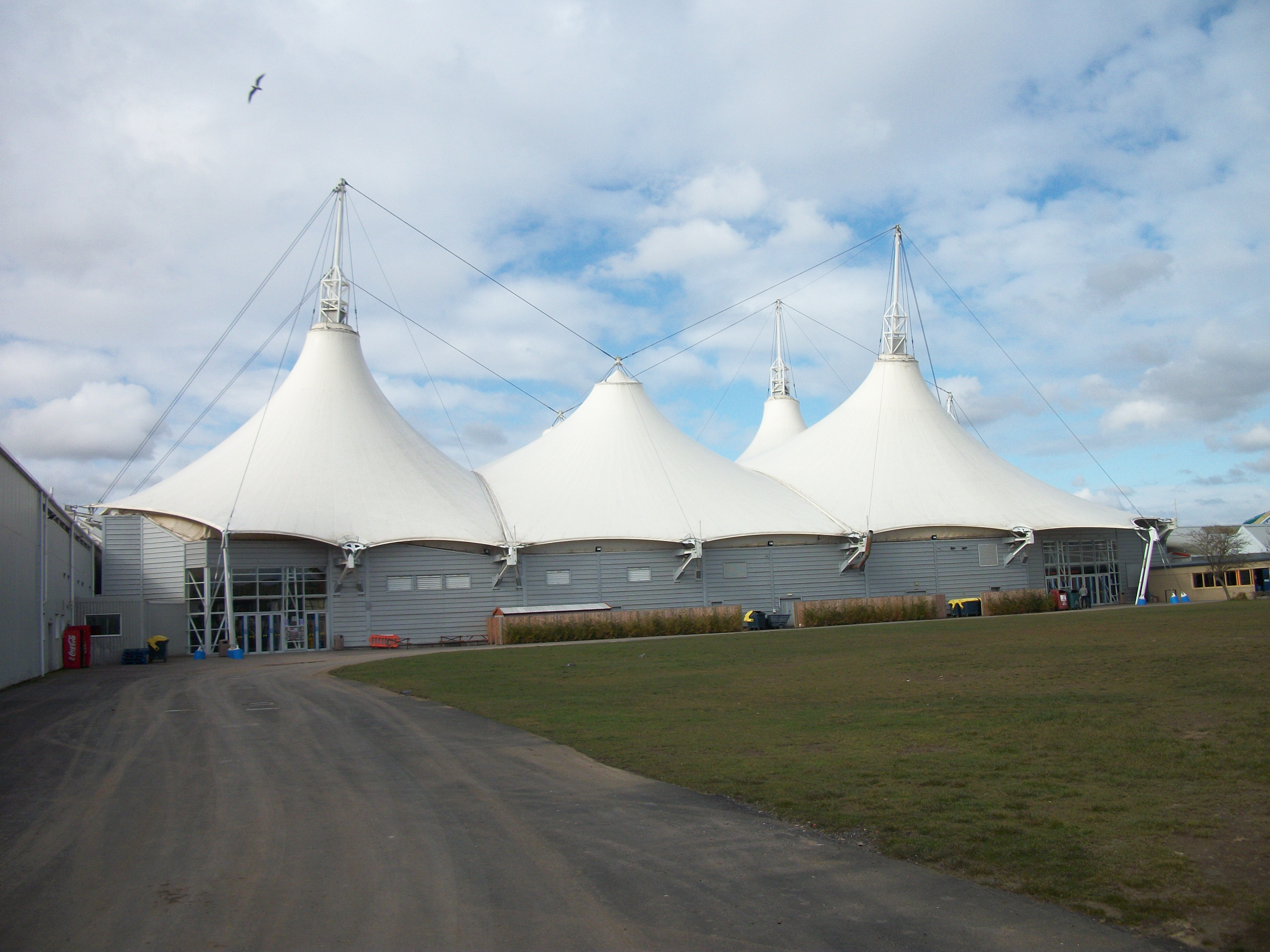
Skyline Pavilion in Skegness (2010)

As with its Bognor Regis and Minehead counterparts, the Skegness resort underwent further improvement work in 1998 with the construction of the Skyline Pavilion. This tented structure is described by tourism writer Bruce Prideaux as a "Baby Millennium Dome" even though it pre-dated the dome. The Pavilion contains entertainment facilities such as stages, bars, restaurants, shops and amusements. (Note: Prideaux 2009, p.81) The improvement programme also included the construction of 1,045 brand new accommodation units, making it the largest timber-frame construction project in Europe that year. At the same time, the company dropped its use of the possessive apostrophe, changing from Butlin's to Butlins; after the refurbishment the resort was renamed Butlins Resort Skegness.

== Butlins Resort Skegness ==
Today the resort caters for over 400,000 visitors per year with 350,000 being resident and 70,000 visiting for the day. Along with the nearby Fantasy Island amusement park, the resort is the largest employer in the Skegness area, and currently employs 1,200 staff each year, 40 of which make up the Redcoat team. According to the national police profile of the local residents, a large proportion of the Butlins workforce is now Eastern European in origin.

Over the years many of the attractions have been removed, including the monorail at the end of 2002. However the resort still retains several swimming pools and a funfair. Today it provides a range of activities such as rock climbing, fencing, and archery. It also provides a wide range of entertainment, aided by the formation of strategic partnerships with popular brands, including Britain's Got Talent, Thomas & Friends, Brainiac: Science Abuse, Guinness World Records, Bob the Builder, The Masked Singer and Angelina Ballerina.

== Pop culture and other influences ==
In 1962, the camp played a part in the formation of the line up of the Beatles, when Paul McCartney and John Lennon visited to meet Ringo Starr, who was playing drums with Rory Storm and the Hurricanes at the time, to offer Starr the drummer's position with The Beatles, who had just secured a recording contract. (Note: Hailey 2001, p.200) Storm's group had a summer booking at the camp, following on from the previous year. (Note: Harry 2005, p. 3) It was in 1960, whilst playing Butlin's Pwllheli camp, that Richard Starkey used his stage name Ringo Starr. (Note: Harry 2005, p. 5) The first song McCartney himself ever sang in public was "Long Tall Sally", at a Butlin's talent competition. (Note: White 2003, p. 114–115)

For several years between 1956 and 1959, the comedian and TV presenter Dave Allen worked as a Redcoat at the camp. Allen found that he could not escape it, saying, "You can't get away once they know you—unless you lock yourself in your chalet. If you put on a moustache and dark glasses they'd think you were doing a stunt." (Note: Fletcher 1974, p. 150)

Other acts who have performed at the camp during the careers include Laurel and Hardy, T'Pau, and Suzi Quatro.

In his 2010 book How to Land an A330 Airbus (And Other Vital Skills for the Modern Man), James May included a section entitled "How to Escape from Butlins" – specifically, Butlins Skegness in the event of hostile forces using it as an internment camp. He reasoned that it had already proved easily convertible to a naval base and that Britain was unprepared for sudden invasions as a result of overseas deployments. He suggests a tunnel in the style of The Great Escape, only with help from a microboring machine to aid the process, from a chalet to the static caravan park.

In September 2016, after Burning Man organizers concocted a PR stunt claiming David Bowie's ashes had been publicly dispersed on the playa that year, Bowie's son Duncan Jones denied the claim, jocularly adding, "We all know if dad DID want his ashes scattered in front of strangers, it would be at the Skegness Butlins." He later confirmed this as a joke.

== Entertainment ==
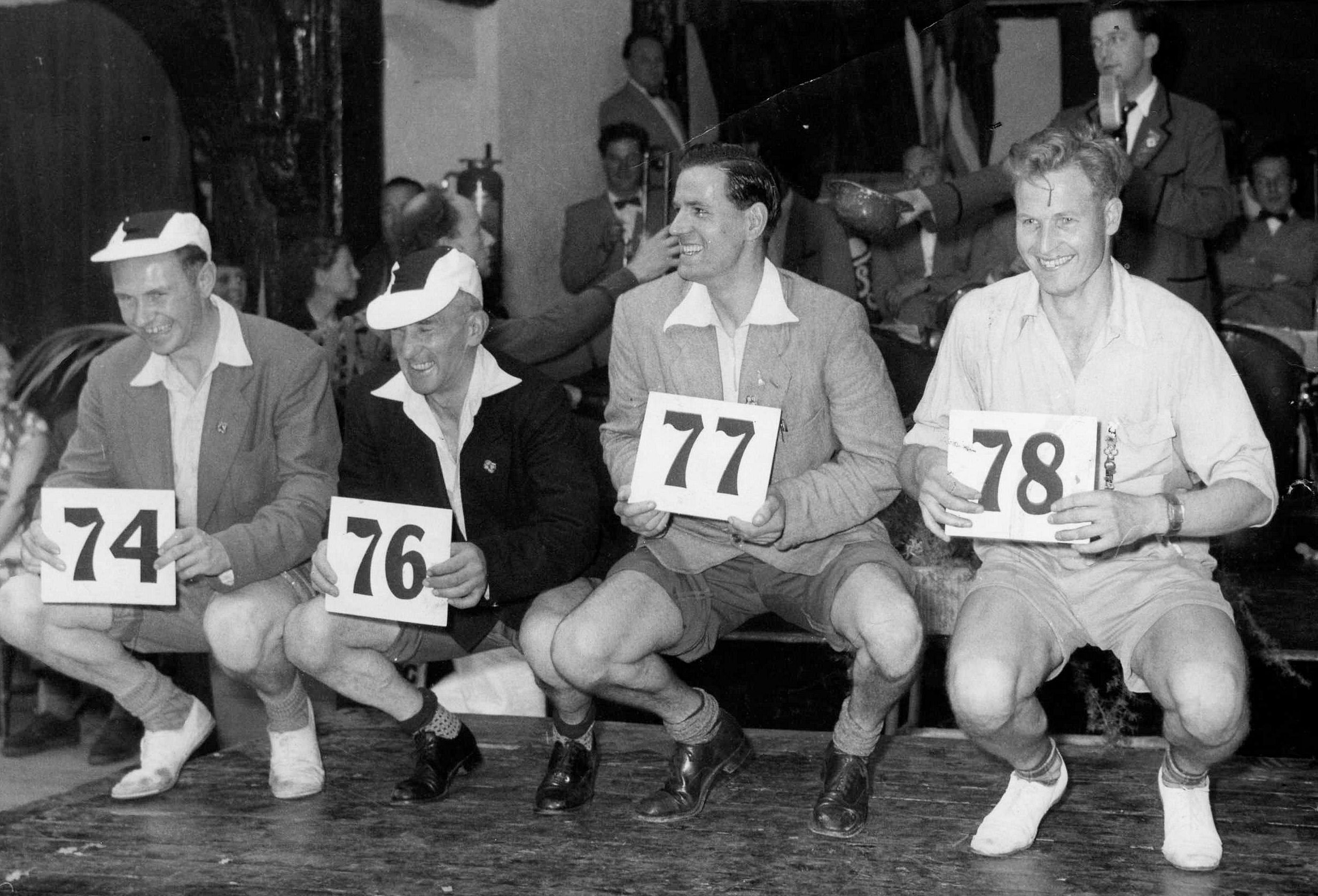
A 1956 "knobbly knees" contest at Butlins Skegness

The Skegness camp contained all the standard Butlins entertainment ingredients: Butlins Redcoats, a funfair, a ballroom, a boating lake, tennis courts, a sports field (for the three legged and egg & spoon races and the donkey derby), table tennis and snooker tables, amusement arcades, a theatre, arcades of shops, a chairlift system and a miniature railway.

Butlins Skegness developed the Ex More Adventures which include a climbing wall, diving courses, horse riding, Land Rover safari, fly fishing and sea fishing, sailing, canoeing and coasteering, some of which are held at Exmoor National Park.

=== Topping The Bill At Your Centre Stage In Skegness ===
- Spider-Man The Musical (30 April 1999 – 25 June 1999)
- The Mask Musical (28 June 1999 – September 1999)
- Casper The Musical (6 September 1999 – 26 November 1999)

== Official visits ==
- On Saturday 29 February 1992, Prince Edward visited Funcoast World, for a reception of industrialists, in connection with the Duke of Edinburgh's Award, in association with East Midlands Electricity. The Prince later visited a caravan park, and a meeting for voluntary organisations at the Seacroft Hotel.

== Bibliography ==
- Butler, Richard; Russell, Roslyn A. (2010). Giants of Tourism. CABI. ISBN 978-1-84593-652-5.
- Dacre, Peter (1982). The Billy Butlin Story. Robson Books. ISBN 0-86051-864-7.
- Donald, Thomas (2006). Villains' paradise:a history of Britain's underworld. Pegasus Books. ISBN 1-933648-17-1.
- Fletcher (Ph.D.), Colin (1974). Beneath the surface: an account of three styles of sociological research. Taylor & Francis. ISBN 0-7100-7979-6.
- Hailey, Charlie (2009). Camps:a guide to 21st-century space. MIT Press. ISBN 978-0-262-08370-6.
- Harry, Bill. "While My Guitar Gently Weeps: The Tragic Story of Rory Storm & the Hurricanes". Bill Harry.
- James, T. C. G.; Cox, Sebastian (2000). The battle of Britain. Routledge. p. 139. ISBN 0-714651-23-0.
- Lavery, Brian (2009). In Which They Served. Anova Books. ISBN 978-1-84486-097-5.
- Prideaux, Bruce (2009). Resort Destinations: Evolution, Management and Development. Butterworth-Heinemann. ISBN 978-0-7506-5753-2.
- Scott, Peter (February 2001). A History of the Butlin's Railways. Peter Scott. ISBN 1-902368-09-6.
- White, Charles (2003). The Life and Times of Little Richard: The Authorized Biography. Omnibus Press. ISBN 978-0-7119-9761-5.
