= Electric Palace Cinema, Harwich =

Cinema in Harwich, Essex, England

Coordinates: 51.9465°N 1.2888°E

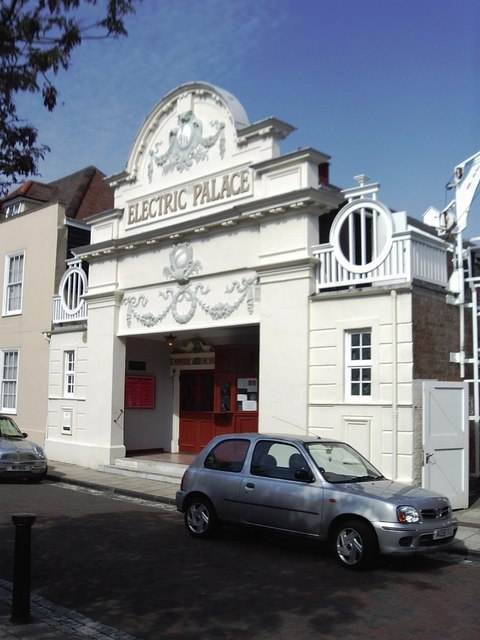
Electric Palace cinema, Harwich.

The Electric Palace cinema, Harwich, is one of the oldest purpose-built cinemas to survive complete with its silent screen, original projection room and ornamental frontage still intact. It was designed by the architect Harold Ridley Hooper of Ipswich, Suffolk and opened on 29 November 1911.

Other interesting features include an open plan entrance lobby complete with paybox, and a small stage plus dressing rooms although the latter are now unusable. The original Crossley gas engine, which provided, in conjunction with a 100 V DC generator, the electricity for the "Electric" Palace until 1925 is also still present. Unfortunately it is neither practical to restore, or remove, this engine.

The cinema closed in 1956 after being damaged in the 1953 East Coast floods, but re-opened in 1981, retaining the original screen, projection room and frontage as well as much of the original interior. It is now a community cinema and until 2006, when a Wednesday screening programme was introduced, films were shown at weekends only. The building also hosts regular jazz and folk concerts.

The cinema is a Grade II* listed building and in 2009 was removed from the Buildings at Risk Register maintained by English Heritage following structural refurbishment, the completion of which, was celebrated on 15 July 2009.

In November 2006, British actor Clive Owen became patron of the cinema and at his first official visit he helped launch an appeal to raise funds to repair this historic building.

In May 2021 the Electric Palace was used as a location for Downton Abbey: A New Era

== History ==
=== 1911–1956 ===
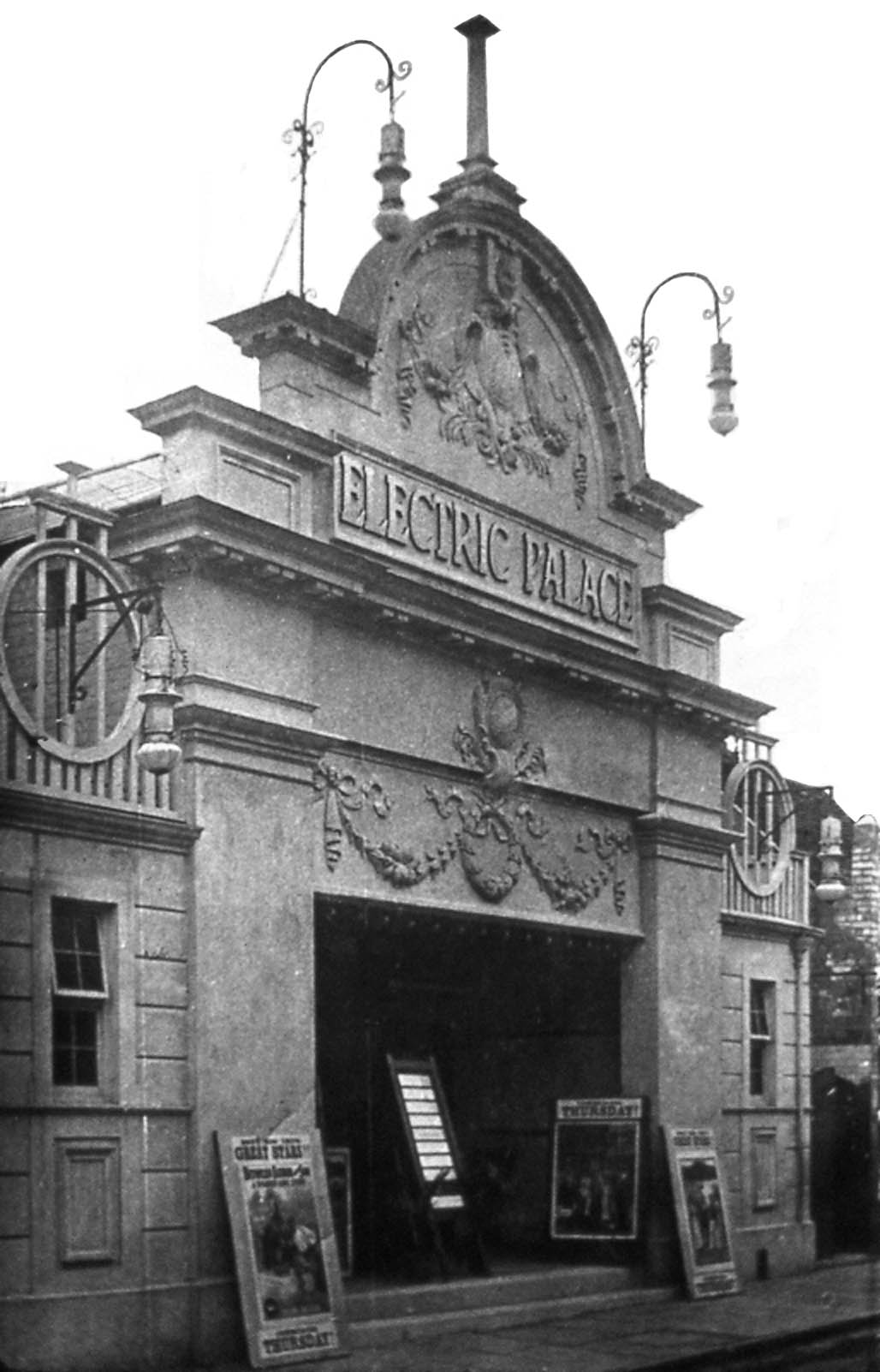
The Electric Palace in 1912

In the early years of the 20th century the travelling fairground Showman Charles Thurston was touring East Anglia with his Bioscope shows. Such travelling 'moving picture' shows were common at the time, but with the introduction of the Cinematograph Act 1909, which imposed strict fire prevention regulations on any venue in which films were shown to the public, it became effectively impossible to put on a legal film show in a fairground tent. Hence Thurston decided to build a permanent "Picture Palace" in which he could continue to screen films to the public.

In 1911 he was able to obtain a lease on a site in Kings Quay Street, Harwich which had become vacant due to the previous building on the site being destroyed by fire. He engaged the young architect Harold Hooper to design the building, which was to be known as the Electric Palace, for him. Hooper was a dynamic young man of 26 years who demonstrated his imaginative flair with this his first major building.

The Electric Palace was built in 18 weeks at a cost of £1,500 and opened on Wednesday, 29 November 1911, the first film being "The Battle of Trafalgar and The Death of Nelson".

The cinema was an immediate success and continued to be financially successful through WW1 thanks to the presence of Navy personnel in the port of Harwich. However almost as soon as the war was over business at the "Palace", as the cinema was now called, went into decline due to the loss of population from Harwich to nearby Dovercourt and competition from the newer, plusher, cinemas there.

For nearly four decades the Palace struggled on, never doing badly enough to close, but never doing well enough to justify enlargement or a major facelift. The coming of sound in 1930 gave a boost, but it was short-lived. Then in 1953 the cinema was inundated by seawater due to the East-Coast flood of that year, which forced it to close. Although it was dried-out, repaired and reopened, the floods had affected more than just the cinema, nearby housing had also been affected reducing further the local population. This proved to be the 'last nail in the coffin', and the Palace closed after 45 years of operation, following a final showing of the Glynis Johns comedy: "Mad about Men", on 3 November 1956.

=== 1972–present ===
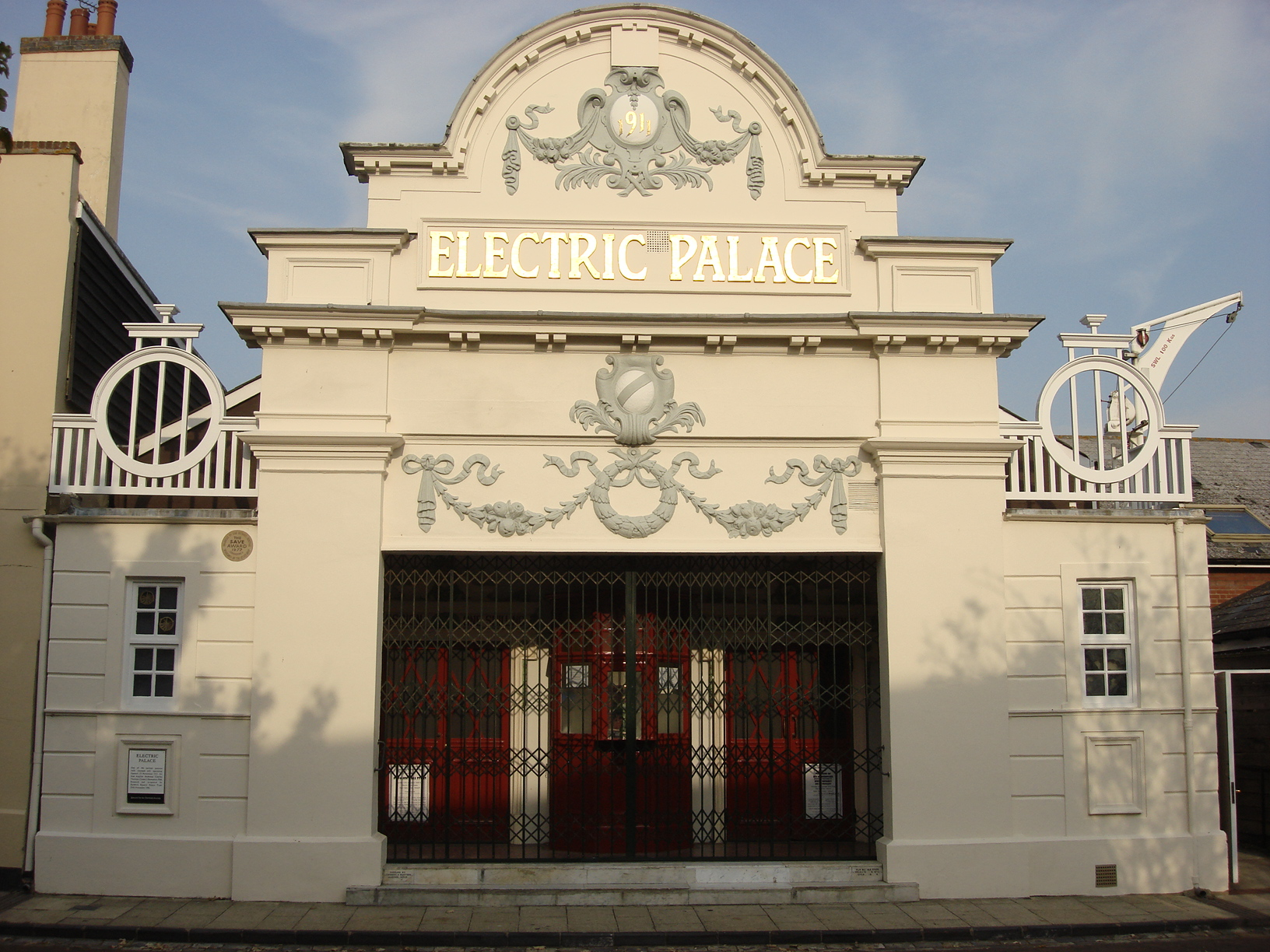
Electric Palace Cinema in 2009

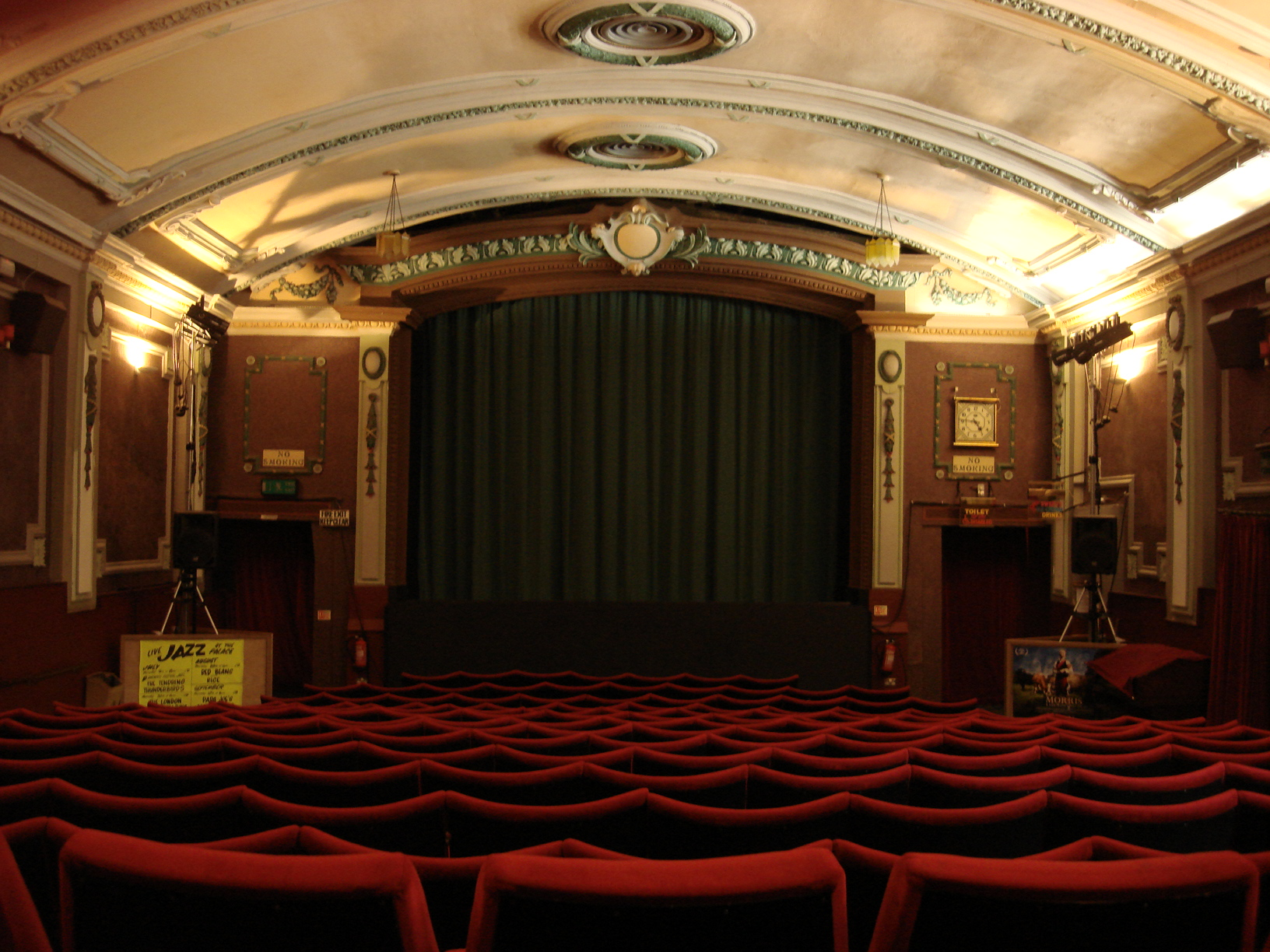
Electric Palace Cinema Interior

For the next 16 years the building lay abandoned and largely forgotten until in 1972 it was "discovered" by Gordon Miller of Kingston Polytechnic, who was leading a group of students on a survey of Harwich. He was amazed to find this virtually unaltered relic of the early period of cinema architecture lying forgotten in a Harwich side-street. He was also disturbed to discover that the town council was intending to demolish the entire block of which the cinema was a part to provide additional parking space for lorries.

With the aid of the Harwich Society he obtained a listing for the cinema as being "a building of sociological interest" in September of that year.

This action infuriated the council, and split opinion in the town. The local newspaper carried letters variously describing the building as "a derelict flea-pit of no interest", or as "a potential asset to the town". An unknown wit wrote:

They came from Kingston to survey the town,

and stopped us from pulling the old Palace down.

If they like it so much,

this tumbledown shack,

to Kingston-on-Thames may they carry it back.

For a couple of years the arguments flew, it even made the national newspapers. Meanwhile, Gordon Miller researched the history of the building from the council archives, contemporary newspaper reports and interviews with surviving members of the Electric Palace staff.

In April 1975 the Electric Palace Trust was formed with the avowed aim of restoring the building so that it could, again, be used as a fully operational cinema. The council granted a "repairing lease" to the Trust in May of that year and restoration started, initially using mostly volunteer labour. Later the council was to sell the freehold to the Trust.

The cinema, having reverted to its original name of Electric Palace, re-opened in 1981. The grand re-opening on 29 November 1981, the 70th anniversary of the original opening, was filmed by the BBC for their children's programme "Blue Peter".

The Electric Palace now runs as a community cinema showing films every weekend. Typically, there are five film shows each weekend including matinees. The Sunday evening slot is frequently given over to world cinema, arthouse cinema or classic films, while more mainstream movies occupy the other slots. Special films can be booked for groups such as local schools of relevance to their school curriculum, or societies with a specific interest. Live events include regular jazz concerts and productions by amateur drama groups.

== Patrons of the Electric Palace ==
Poet Laureate, Sir John Betjeman was Patron from 1975 until his death in 1984. Film historian and lecturer on the art of cinema John Huntley was Patron from 1985–2003. The current Patron Clive Owen made his first official visit to the Electric Palace on 10 November 2006 when he helped launch the Electric Palace Appeal.

== Entertainment in the early days ==
In its heyday between 1912 and the 1920s the Electric Palace was the centre of entertainment in Harwich. From the beginning the programmes were full of variety and often the major part of the bill would be taken up with vaudeville rather than films. The venue was regularly played by a wide spectrum of entertainers including acrobats, burlesques, conjurors, hypnotists, impersonators, singers, patterers, knockabouts mimics, dancers and comedians. Notable among this latter group was the young Scottish comedian Will Fyffe who was stationed at Felixstowe during the First World War. Billy Good, who was later the resident pianist, remembered well Will Fyffe's appearances at the Palace and it seems that they were an exception since most of the variety acts between 1915 and 1918 were either juveniles or those too old for active service in the World War.

In the golden age of the Electric Palace society was still fairly rigidly stratified into classes and this reflected in the seating arrangements. Entry to the better seats was through the front entrance foyer, the prices being sixpence for good seats and one shilling for the very best.

The cheaper seats were simply wooden benches and entry to these was past another paybox down an alley at the side. This entrance was known as the 'tuppenny rush.' One doorman remembered the rush being so great that he ended up flat on his back with the children stampeding over him as in a Mack Sennett comedy – and most of them getting in for nothing!

The programme advertisements in the local paper, the Harwich and Dovercourt Standard, of 1912 and 1913 are full of fun and exclamation marks. Great play is made of the superb ventilation, the regular disinfection of the auditorium, the sedate and orderly composure of the clientele, and the exclusiveness of the films.

From the outset the films and vaudeville acts were accompanied at the piano. Billy Good, the pianist from 1920–1922 recalled the very long hours worked by all the staff and particularly himself arduously craning up at the screen from the rather dingy pit recessed into the floor in front of the stage. However, the 'pit neck ache' didn't matter since he was 100% engrossed in the music and loved every minute of it playing two houses every night except Sunday for £1-15s–0d. a week. Billy's career changed course in 1922 when one day a potato chip machine took slices from his fingers rather than the potato. He carried on playing 'with left thumb and little finger 'hors-de-combat' but it didn't take 'old Gilbert', the manager, long to notice the difference. He poked his head over the pit rail and said "You young rascal, you've got a bloody cheek" which under the circumstances was rather appropriate, and possibly literally true. So Billy went off to sea to harden up his injured fingers and when the cinema reopened in 1981 Billy Good, by then in his eighties, returned to the cinema to provide musical accompaniment once again to the occasional silent film.

== Operations and finance ==
Since reopening in 1981, the cinema has been managed by a limited company which is a subsidiary of the Harwich Electric Palace Trust that owns the building. Almost all the staff of the limited company work as volunteers, including the directors, projectionists, managers and sales people. The limited company usually makes a small profit which is then paid over to the charitable trust and thereby used for the maintenance and upgrading of the building. The cinema runs on a club basis and most of the club membership income is used to pay for insurance – one of its chief expenses.

The cinema has no subsidies except for very special events when a grant makes it was possible to present a gala screening, for example of a silent classic with live orchestral accompaniment. The motivation for the project has been the saving and restoration of the building and the renaissance of cinema in a community that had had no cinema for many years.

== Projectors at the Electric Palace ==
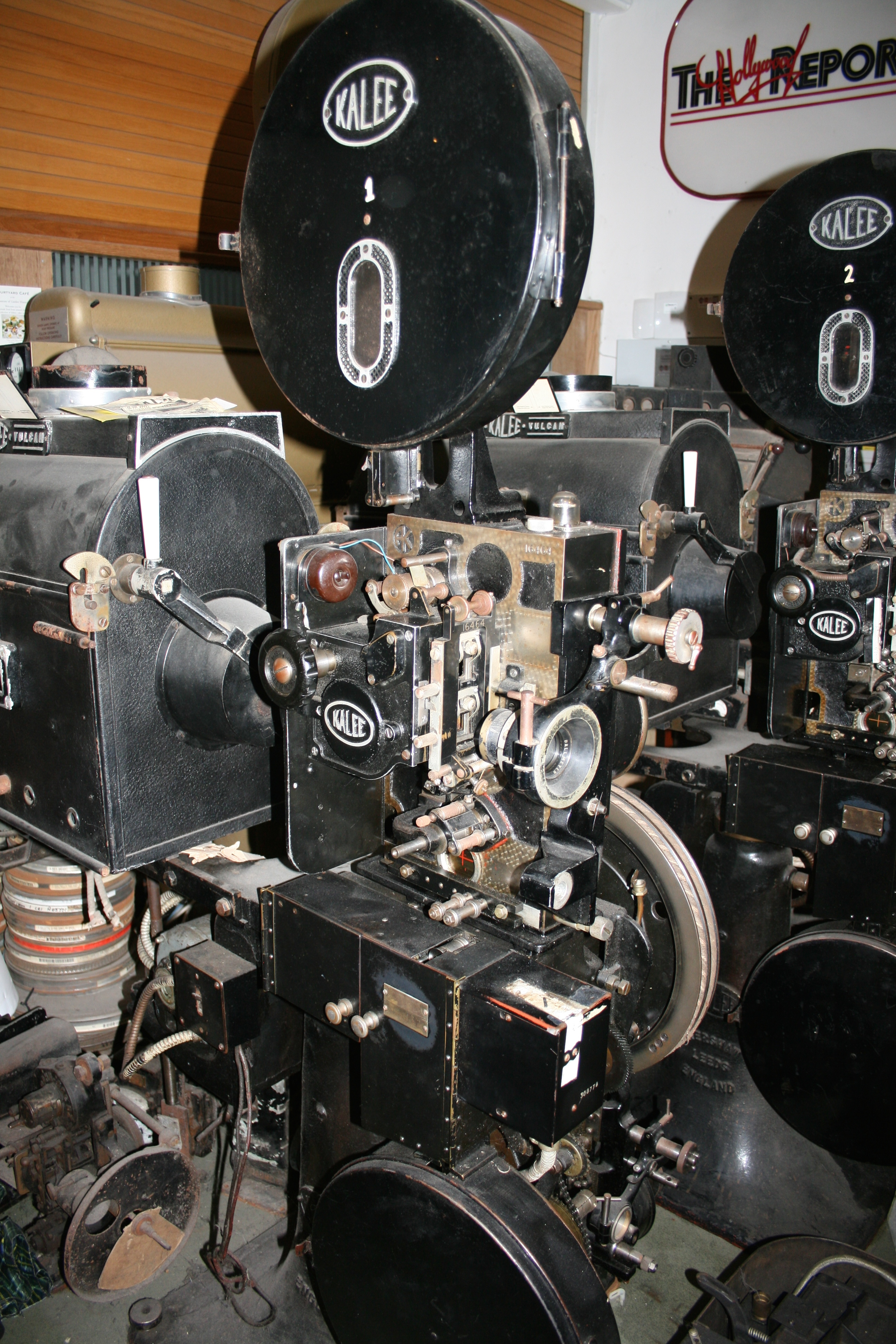
A Gaumont Kalee projector from the 1930s

=== 1911 ===
The Electric Palace opened with a single projector, probably a Kalee. Soon after a Gaumont machine was provided as a standby. In those days films were short and it was not necessary to use two machines together to allow feature-length films to be shown.

=== 1927 ===
A second Gaumont was installed replacing the Kalee. By this time the two projectors were being used together to allow feature-length films to be screened without a break.

=== 1930 ===
Sound-on-disc playback equipment from "Syntok Talking Films Ltd." was installed to allow Vitaphone films to be screened. The first 'talking picture' shown was Warner Brothers' "The Singing Fool", starring Al Jolson, screened on 10 March 1930.

=== 1931 ===
The Syntok equipment had proved to be unsatisfactory, it was both unreliable and had poor sound quality. Consequently, it was replaced by a new Western Electric sound-on-film sound system. This consisted of standard Western Electric soundheads together with the Western Electric 4A amplifier system. The 4A was the smallest of the Western Electric cinema amplifier systems available at the time and was intended for small cinemas. Two Western Electric 12A full-range horn loudspeakers were employed, hung from a substantial wooden structure behind the screen. The high efficiency of these speakers made the most of the limited output power (about 5 watts) of the 4A amplifier system. At the same time the two Gaumont projectors were replaced by new Kalee model 7 machines.

=== 1956 ===
The cinema closed. The projection equipment was left to its fate in the abandoned cinema.

=== 1972 ===
When the cinema was "discovered" in 1972 the projection room equipment was found to have been wrecked by a combination of theft, vandalism and corrosion. When the restoration began what was left of it was stripped-out and disposed of.

=== 1981 ===
As part of the restoration of the cinema Kalee 'Dragon' projectors were installed. These came from the Admiralty Cinema, Whitehall where Churchill used to watch the rushes of the war newsreels. The lamps were Vulcan arcs from the Regent Cinema in nearby Dovercourt. The sound system was initially driven by a Kalee model 522 valve amplifier. This equipment was used at the re-opening of the cinema on 29 November 1981.

=== 1985 ===
Kalee 20s and Peerless carbon arcs were installed replacing the Kalee Dragons. The projectors came from the Odeon Cinema in Clacton in Essex and the Peerless carbon arcs came from the Regal Cinema in Stowmarket, Suffolk. The Kalee valve amplifier was replaced by a DIY stereo sound system that consisted of two mono Dolby A cinema systems (Dolby 364 with E2 equaliser) which came from the ABC Cinema in Ipswich Suffolk, together with Quad 606 amplifiers and Celestion SR1/SR2 loudspeakers.

=== 1998 ===
With the help of an Arts Council of England lottery grant the projection system was refurbished. Xenon arc bulbs replaced the carbon arcs and new rectifiers were fitted. A new sound system based around a Dolby CP500 processor was installed. This can play films with mono or Dolby Stereo analogue soundtracks as well as those with a 5.1 Dolby Digital soundtrack. The reel arms were extended to take 6000 foot reels and inverters were installed for the drive motors. New Isco wide screen and anamorphic lenses were installed. A Sanyo PLC-XF12B multimedia projector was also provided for use with a computer or for showing DVDs or Blu-ray discs.

=== 2011 ===
Digital projection equipment comprising a Christie CP2220 digital projector and a Doremi DCP-2k4 server was installed. Which can project up to full hd 1080p

== Palace Digital Fund ==
A campaign was launched in 2010 to bring the iconic cinema into the digital age. The cost of the new digital equipment was estimated at £55,000 and the Electric Palace Trust aimed to raise the money by November 2011 when the cinema celebrated its centenary. This aim was realised with the aid of funding from the Digital Funding Partnership, a joint venture between the Cinema Exhibitors Association and the Belgian company XDC, and with the help of grants from local government and other grant-making bodies.

This equipment was first used on the evening of the centenary, 29 November 2011, to screen the new Terence Davies film "The Deep Blue Sea".

The cinema will retain the two 60-year-old Kalee model 20 projectors so that in future, when new releases are all digital, it will still be possible to screen pre-digital-age films such as those from the National Archive of the British Film Institute. Over the years the Electric Palace has built up a very good working relationship with the BFI because it can project these historic films on the class of machines on which they were projected at first release.

== Notable visitors to the cinema ==
Famous visitors to the cinema include:

- HM Queen Elizabeth II and HRH Prince Philip, Duke of Edinburgh (25 November 2004)
- British film director Terence Davies (14 December 2009)
- Founder and former president of the Cinema Theatre Association Tony Moss (2001)
- British actor Kenneth Cranham (2003)
- The cinema's patron Clive Owen (10 November 2006) (14 July 2009) (10 April 2022) (7 August 2022)
- Michelle Dockery and James Dancy (May 2021) whilst filming scenes for Downton Abbey: A New Era
- Su Pollard 21 August 2022
- Rick Wakeman 28 January 2024
