= John Shewell Corder =

English architect and artist

John Shewell Corder (1856 in Westoe, South Tyneside – 19 July 1922 in Ipswich) was an English architect, artist and antiquarian.

== Early life ==
Corder came from a well-connected Quaker family with links in East Anglia, North England and Berkshire. He was the son of Frederick Corder and Jane Ransome, daughter of James Ransome. Along with other siblings the family moved to Ipswich in 1860. He was given the name of Shewell from Fredrick's mother, Mary Shewell.

== Architectural career ==
During the period 1872-7, Corder was articled to his step-uncle, the architect Joseph Morris based in Reading. Frederic Corder had married Maria Morris, Joseph's sister, both of whom were children of Thomas Morris and Ann Talwin Shewell.

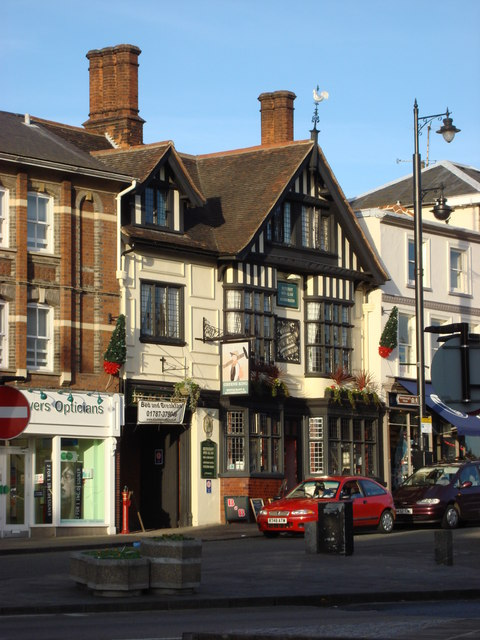
Corder worked on the exposed timbers and plaster work of the Black Boy using a Tudor style

Corder has been credited with over 100 commissions. These include:

- Boscombe House, 65 Anglesea Road, Ipswich, (Grade II listed building)
- Hacheston Lodge, The Street, Hacheston
- Extra classrooms for Woodbridge School in Burkitt road, Woodbridge, Suffolk,
- Work on the Black Boy public house, Sudbury
- Tranmer House, 1910. Home of Edith Pretty during the 1938-39 excavation of the Sutton Hoo Anglo-Saxon burial mounds.

He trained Harold Ridley Hooper who later became a prominent Ipswich architect.

== Publications ==
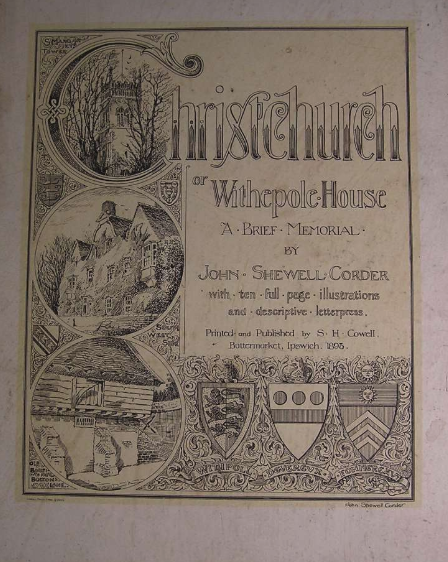
Christchurch or Withepole House: A Brief Memorial

Corder joined the Suffolk Institute of Archaeology & History. He also made several contributions to their journal:

- "The Guild Hall, of Corpus Christi, Lavenham" Volume VII, part 2 (1890)
- "The timber framed buildings of Ipswich and their pargetting", Volume VII Part 3 (1891)
- "Notes on Bury corner posts", Volume XVI Part 3 (1918) Published as a separate booklet, 50 copies.

Other publications:

- Ye Olde Corner Posts of Ipswich, (1890) S. H. Cowell: Ipswich
- Christchurch or Withepole House: A Brief Memorial (1893) S. H. Cowell: Ipswich

== Sources ==
- Bettley, John; Pevsner, Nikolaus (2015). Suffolk: East. Buildings of England. New Haven, US and London: Yale University Press. ISBN 978-0-300-19654-2. OCLC 995084088.
