= The Margaret Catchpole, Ipswich =

Pub in Ipswich, Suffolk, England

Coordinates: 52.0451°N 1.1721°E

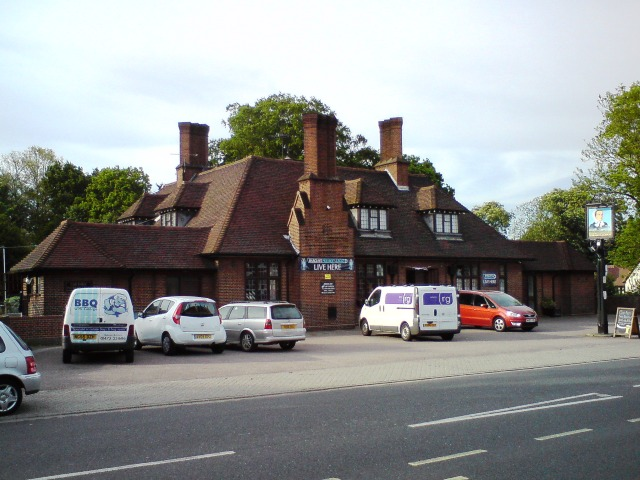
Margaret Catchpole Public House, May 2009

The Margaret Catchpole is a pub in Cliff Lane, Ipswich in Suffolk, England. It is named after Margaret Catchpole, a servant of Elizabeth and John Cobbold of the Tolly Cobbold brewery. Built in 1936 by the local architect Harold Ridley Hooper for the Cobbold brewery, it is a Grade II* listed building. Most of its interior features have remained unaltered since the 1930s, making it one of the finest examples of this period in England. Since 2003 it has been part of the Holywells Park Conservation Area.
