= Margaret Catchpole =

English chronicler and deportee to Australia (1762–1819)

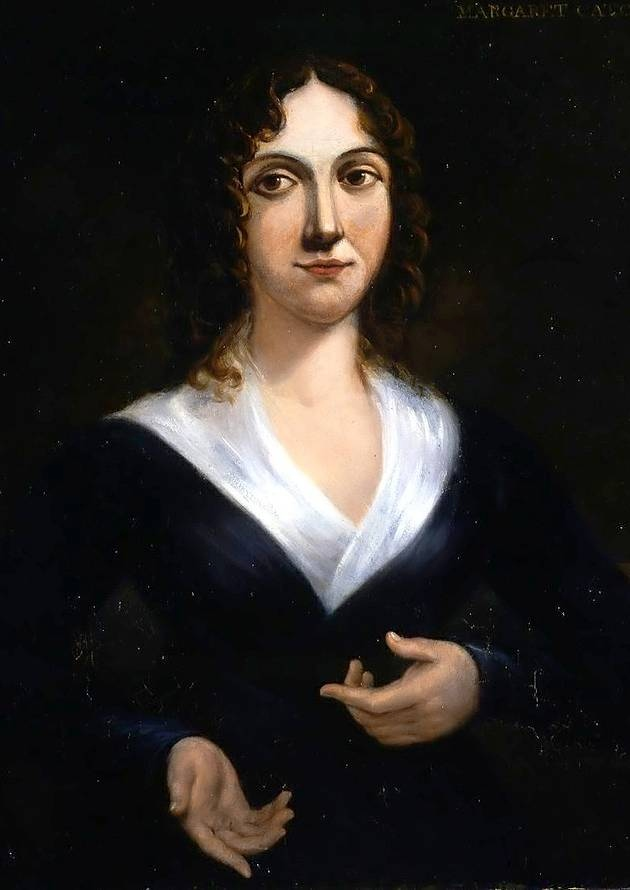
- A portrait of Catchpole dating from the 1840s, painted from memory by Richard Cobbold
- Born: 14 March 1762; Nacton, Suffolk, England
- Died: 13 May 1819 (aged 57); Richmond, New South Wales, Australia
- Occupations: Servant, nurse, cook, midwife

Margaret Catchpole (14 March 1762 – 13 May 1819) was an English servant girl, chronicler, and deportee to Australia. Born in Suffolk, she worked as a servant in various houses before being convicted of stealing a horse and escaping from Ipswich Gaol. Following her recapture, she was transported to the Australian penal colony of New South Wales, where she remained for the rest of her life. Her entry in the Australian Dictionary of Biography describes her as "one of the few true convict chroniclers with an excellent memory and a gift for recording events".

== Early life ==
Catchpole was reputedly born in 1762, at Nacton, Suffolk, the daughter of Elizabeth Catchpole and, according to one source, of Jonathan Catchpole, head ploughman.

Catchpole had little education and worked as a servant for different families until being employed in May 1793 as under-nurse and under-cook by the writer Elizabeth Cobbold at her house on St Margaret's Green in Ipswich. Cobbold's husband John was a brewer and member of the prosperous Ipswich Cobbold family. Catchpole was close to the family and was responsible for saving the lives of children in her care three times. She also learned to read and write while employed by the Cobbolds.

== Crimes ==
According to the romanticised story of her life, Catchpole met and fell in love with William Laud, a sailor who was involved with smuggling goods. In 1797, about a year after leaving the service of the Cobbold family because of their dislike of Laud, Catchpole stole a horse from the Cobbold's stable to ride to London to meet with Laud. She supposedly dressed as a man to avoid suspicion and rode the horse for seventy miles in ten hours.

John Cobbold had a handbill printed offering a reward for the recovery of the horse, which was described as a: "strawberry roan crop coach gelding" with a "nag tail." The horse was recognised as Catchpole passed through Colchester and she was arrested in London. She was convicted of stealing the horse and was sentenced to death at the Bury Assizes, on 9 August 1797. After her sentence was commuted to seven years imprisonment, due to appeals made on her behalf by the Cobbold family, Catchpole was imprisoned in Ipswich Gaol.

Catchpole escaped from Ispwich Goal on 25 March 1800. According to local legend, she scaled the 22-foot gaol wall aided by a clothesline and dressed as a sailor. A notice of her escape was published in the "Hue and Cry" of the Police Gazette in April 1800. Following her recapture, she was sentenced by the same judge and was transported to the Australian penal colony of New South Wales on 27 May 1801, where she remained for the rest of her life.

In Australia, Catchpole worked as a cook, nurse, midwife and housekeeper. She corresponded by letter with the Cobbold family. Due to her good reputation, she was pardoned in 1814 by Governor Lachlan Macquarie, but did not return to England. She did not marry and died from influenza in 1819.

== Papers ==
=== Archives ===
Archival materials relating to Catchpole and her relationship with the Cobbold family are held by the Suffolk Archives, the Ipswich Museum, the National Library of Australia, and the State Library of New South Wales. Some of her surviving letters were roughly transcribed on the State Library website and were reproduced in Laurie Chater Forth's Margaret Catchpole: Her Life and Her Letters (Richmond, 2012). They are also discussed, with excerpts, by Marthe Jocelyn in Scribbling Women: True Tales from Astonishing Lives (Toronto, 2011).

In 2025, letters by Catchpole on loan from the National Library of Australia and the State Library of New South Wales were displayed as part of the "Behind Bars - Suffolk's Criminal Past" exhibition at the Suffolk Archives.

=== Content ===
Catchpole's letters describe Hawkesbury River floods, frontier conflict with Indigenous Australians, the countryside and its wildlife, economic developments such as the use of convict miners at Coal River (Newcastle), and the savagery of colonial manners and customs — "by her writings [she] added greatly to Australia's early history".

== In culture ==
Etching of Margaret Catchpole by Richard Cobbold, 1845. This is the first known pictorial representation of her

=== The History of Margaret Catchpole, a Suffolk Girl ===
Reverend Richard Cobbold (son of her former employers) made Catchpole the subject of a novel, The History of Margaret Catchpole, a Suffolk Girl (London, 1845), which has often been reprinted.

Cobbold used letters written by Catchpole to his family as the basis of his work, and while he stated in the preface that "the public may depend upon the truth of the main features of this narrative", he took some liberties and also got some details wrong. For example:

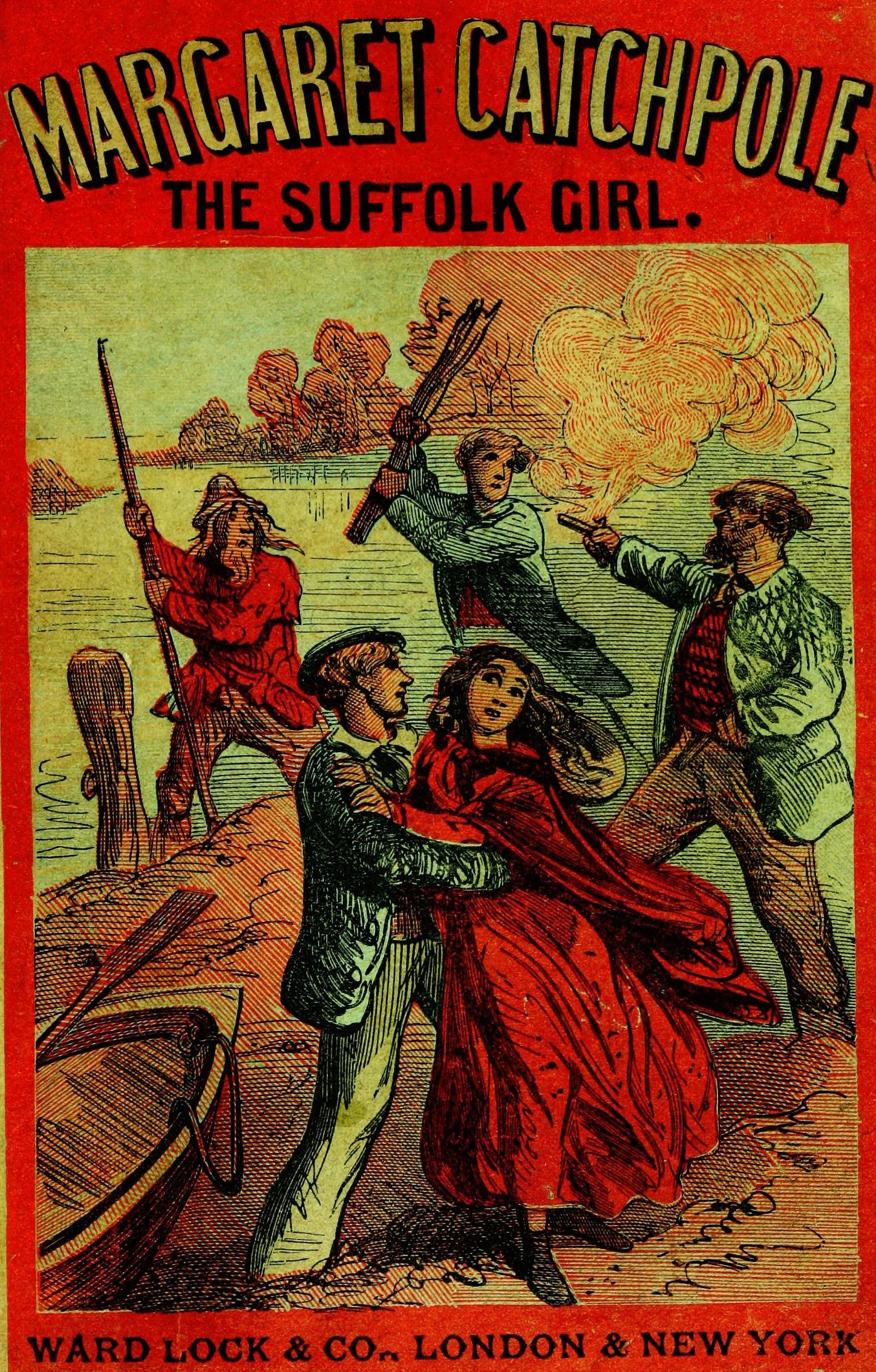
Yellowback cover of a 1890 reprint of Cobbold's book

- Education: Cobbold's heroine speaks and writes as a cultivated woman, when her letters (see above) show that her education was limited.
- Marriage: He believed Catchpole married in 1812 and had children — this appears to have been a genuine conviction rather than poetic licence; however, there is no record of a marriage, she invariably describes herself as being on her own, and she is unlikely to have started a family at the age of fifty.
- Death: Cobbold maintains that Catchpole lived until 1841; however, the register of burials at Richmond leaves no doubt that she died in 1819: "Margaret Catchpole, aged 57 years, came prisoner in the Nile, in the year 1801. Died May 13; was buried May 14, 1819. — Henry Fulton".

=== Other appearances in popular culture ===
Later works, many of which rely to varying degrees on Cobbold's novel, include:

- 1854: Margaret Catchpole, the Female Horse Stealer!, a popular drama produced in London.
- 1887: An English Lass, an Australian play by Alfred Dampier and C. H. Krieger, with Lily Dampier as Catchpole in the original production. The play was revived in 1893.
- 1911: The Romantic Story of Margaret Catchpole, an Australian silent film directed by Raymond Longford and starring Lottie Lyell in the title role. Only part of the movie survives today.
- 1945: Margaret Catchpole, a radio play by Rex Rienits produced twice by the Australian Broadcasting Corporation: in 1945 with Bebe Scott as the lead and in 1958 starring Alda Ferris.
- 1949: Margaret Catchpole, the Girl from Wolfkettel, a novel by George Goldsmith Carter. Wolfkettel is, or was, a Saxon name for the area around Nacton.
- 1966: The Extraordinary Margaret Catchpole, a novel for children by Ruth Manning-Sanders that concentrates on her life before she was deported.
- 1972: The Smuggler's Wench, a bodice-ripper by Monica Mugan adapted from the Cobbold novel.
- 1974: Margaret Catchpole, a novel for children by Australian author Nance Donkin, with illustrations by Edwina Bell, depicting Catchpole as a pioneering convict woman.
- 1979: Margaret Catchpole: Two Worlds Apart, a chamber opera by the English composer Stephen Dodgson with a libretto by Suffolk-based writer Ronald Fletcher, recorded by Naxos in 2019.
- 2000: Margaret Catchpole, a play first produced by the Eastern Angles theatre company in England and revived in 2012 as part of the company's 30th anniversary celebrations.
- 2007: Scapegallows, a novel by Carol Birch based on Catchpole's experience.
- 2019: "Margaret Catchpole", a song by East Suffolk folk group Honey and the Bear on their album Made in the Aker.

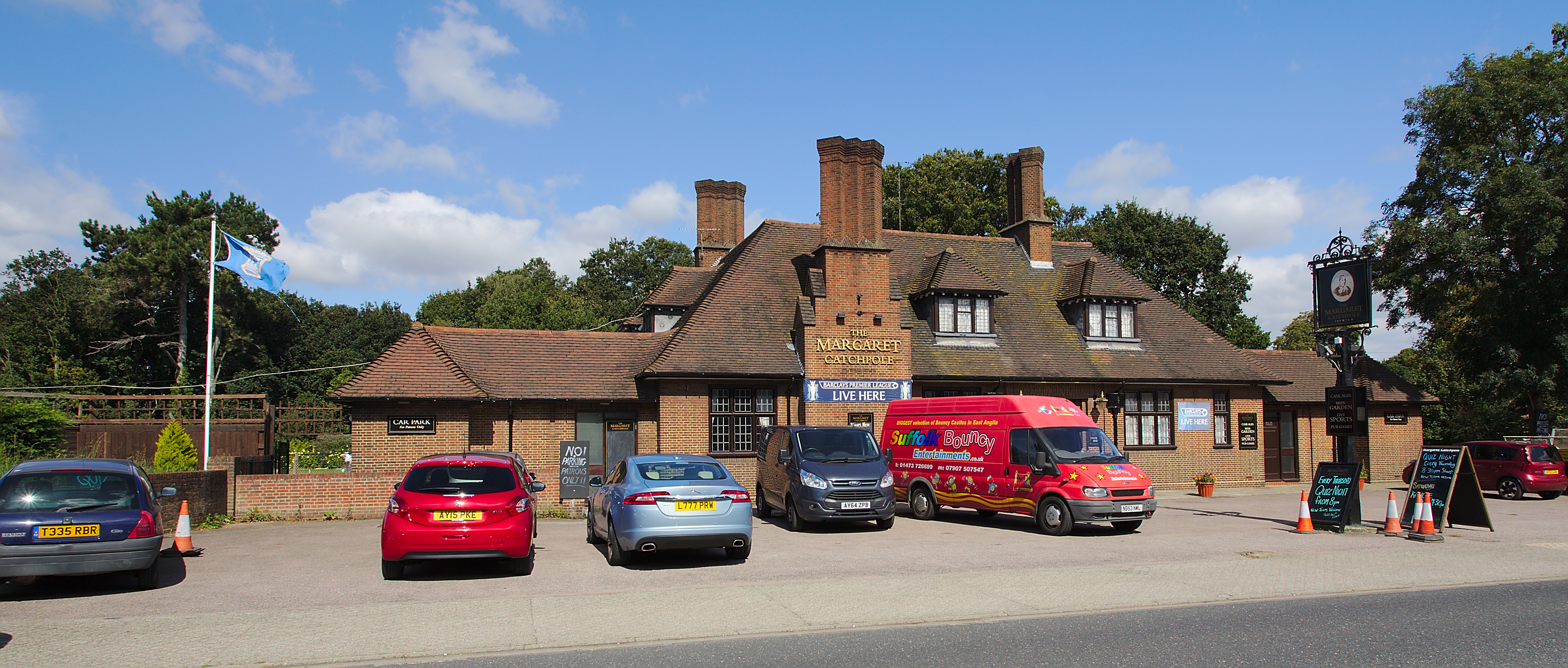
The Margaret Catchpole Public House, Cliff Lane, Ipswich

=== As eponym ===
- The Margaret Catchpole Public House is situated on Cliff Lane close to the site of the Cobbold Brewery in Ipswich.

== See also ==
- List of 18th-century British working-class writers
- List of convicts transported to Australia
