= Harold Ridley Hooper =

English architect

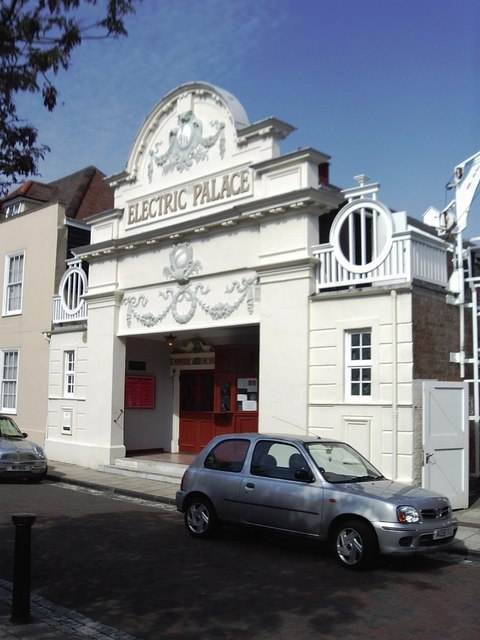
Electric Palace Cinema, Harwich, designed by Hooper in 1911.

Harold Ridley Hooper (1886, Bury St Edmunds – 1953) was an English architect based in Ipswich, Suffolk.

He was elected ARIBA in 1910, having been articled to John Shewell Corder, and started his own practice in Ipswich in 1912. He was a Colonel in the 4th Battalion of the Suffolk Regiment during World War I. He was later Deputy Lord Lieutenant of Suffolk.

His buildings include:

- Electric Palace Cinema, Harwich (1911),
- Butlins Skegness holiday camp (1936) and other designs for Butlins Ltd.
- Belstead House
- Margaret Catchpole Public House, (1936)
