= Margaret Catchpole (opera) =

1979 English chamber opera

Margaret Catchpole: Two Worlds Apart is a chamber opera written in 1979 by the English composer Stephen Dodgson with a libretto by Suffolk-based writer, Ronald Fletcher. It was commissioned by The Brett Valley Society of the Arts with Arts Council assistance.

The story is the slightly altered true story of Margaret Catchpole, a young Suffolk girl employed by the Cobbold family, who fell in love with a smuggler (William Laud), stole a horse in a desperate attempt to meet him in London, was tried and sentenced to death but reprieved and sent to Australia.

== Full synopsis ==
=== Act 1. ===
Preparations for Harvest Home are in progress at Priory Farm when the servant girl, Margaret Catchpole, is surprised by a sudden encounter with her smuggler amour, Will Laud, whose fatal attraction for her provides the dramatic mainspring of the famous story. Although she expresses her dislike of Laud's chosen profession, she turns down an offer of marriage by John Barry, the local miller's son, and agrees to meet Laud on the river bank that night. She slips away unnoticed by the revellers. But incensed by her refusal to elope clandestinely, Laud, abetted by his villainous companion, John Luff, attempts her abduction. This is foiled by the intervention of Barry. The smugglers escape, but Barry is left wounded on the beach, watched over by the half-crazed fisherman ‘Crusoe’.

=== Act 2. ===
Mrs. Cobbold has taken Margaret into service in her prosperous Ipswich household. Barry, now recovered, pleads with Margaret to marry him, but her belief in Laud's fundamental goodness cannot be shaken; she concedes only the evil of his occupation and companions. Barry, upset, resolves to emigrate. In her desperation to have news of Laud Margaret causes friction in the household and is rebuked by her kindly employer for inviting unsavoury seamen into the kitchen to enquire after Laud. This is followed by Margaret's contemptuous words conveyed via the kitchen maid to the very next caller, before Margaret is aware of his identity. When he leaves a bag addressed to her, she realises, horrified, that the visitor was Laud, now an officer in the King's Navy. Meanwhile, the relationship between Laud and Luff has soured, and mostly on Margaret's account. Luff hits on a scheme to be rid of them both in a single act of treachery. A forged note persuades Margaret to steal a horse and ride to London.

=== Act 3. ===
The courtroom judge sternly reminds Margaret that horse-stealing is a capital offence. The excellence of her character, however, secures a reprieve, and looks likely to shorten her days in prison. Two years pass. Unluckily she chances to meet Laud in the yard on his way to freedom after a brief spell inside. The fatal attraction is as strong as ever. She climbs the wall that night to join him. A radiant dawn greets them on the river bank, but the boat Laud expects is unaccountably delayed and they are overtaken by the pursuit. Refusing to give Margaret up Laud defies the guards and is shot dead. Back in the courtroom, Margaret rails against the ‘justice’ that has killed the man she loved. This time, Margaret is initially sentenced to death but the sentence is then commuted to transportation for life. Margaret considers this a ‘living death’ but Mrs. Cobbold comforts her with words encouragement.

=== Act 4. ===
Australia. Mrs Palmer, the head of a girls’ orphanage, is visited by John Barry who is now the local Governor's agent and a great benefactor. He asks after a servant she had previously recommended for his brother-in-law. She explains that the girl was transported to Australia a year earlier for stealing a horse in Suffolk to join her lover but that she has proved nothing but loyal, trustworthy and devoted since. She is due to return to Mrs Palmer from a housekeeping job that very day. Barry realises with wonder that it is none other than his beloved Margaret and tells Mrs Palmer he feels sure he can gain her a pardon from the Governor. A week later, Mrs Palmer tells a surprised Margaret that a friend of the Governor has obtained her liberty. Barry himself appears and offers the contrite and grateful Margaret his love and a life with him once more but then bashfully also offers her the freedom to return to England or live life freely in Australia. Margaret throws herself into his arms. In the final scene, in an idyllic setting reminiscent of their home in England, Margaret and Barry cradle their baby, muse on correspondences from their friends in Suffolk and revel in the pure joy of the life they have together.

== Background to composition ==
As a young girl, Stephen Dodgson's wife Jane Clark Dodgson who lived in Suffolk, loved her first edition of the novel The History of Margaret Catchpole (London, 1845, reproduced 2018 by Outlook Verlag, GmbH) by Richard Cobbold. When she met Stephen Dodgson, she passed on this passion on to her husband and Dodgson decided to set the story to music.

When writing of the fourth act, Stephen Dodgson himself described it as follows:

Except for the brief radiance of that one blinding dawn in Act 3, the musical landscape has thus far been sombre. Now, all of a sudden, the sun shines brilliantly. A new happiness is embodied in Mrs. Palmer, head of the girls’ orphanage in Sydney, where Margaret’s work and character win golden opinions. Her horse-stealing and transportation to Australia are true history. But the figure of John Barry and his timely reappearance as the means of a happy ending are pure fiction; invention of that very same Mrs. Cobbold’s son, Richard, whose novel, ‘Margaret Catchpole’ was a runaway best seller in Victorian times, and which is the basis of Ronald Fletcher’s libretto.

The last of three distinct scenes is introduced by a long flute solo over a single quiet harmony. It is a far-off reminder of the Harvest Home of Act 1. Margaret gazes from the balcony of her new home. The scene is so alike: a similar slope to the river – a full moon! Gradually a flood tide of emotional recollection engulfs her. Even ‘Crusoe’ (….“who strangely saw my story to its close” ….) is inextricably mixed up in it. But the full moon is also finally consoling as she struggles to overcome her past and “….make my two worlds one”.

== Performances ==
The opera was first performed June 1979 in a short run in Hadleigh, Suffolk.

Dodgson subsequently rewrote the fourth act in order to tighten it up and it was this version that was then performed at the Wangford Festival in July 1989.

The opera will be performed again as a concert performance and recorded live (for Naxos) in its native Suffolk at Snape Maltings, the home of the Aldeburgh Festival, on 5 July 2019.

== Parts ==
- Margaret Catchpole Mezzo Soprano
- William Laud Tenor
- John Luff Baritone
- Crusoe Tenor
- John Barry Baritone
- Dr. Stebbing & Guard (Act Two and Three) Baritone
- Farmer Denton (Act One) Judge (Act Three) Bass-Baritone
- Mrs. Denton (Act 1 ) Mrs. Cobbold (Act 2 et Seq.) Contralto
- Lucy (Act 1) Alice (Act 2) Mrs. Palmer (Act 4) Soprano

2 Violins, Viola, Cello, Double bass, Harp, Flute, Clarinet (doubling Bass Clarinet), Oboe, Bassoon & Horn.

== Original cast ==
- Ameral Gunson – Margaret Catchpole
- Jack Irons – William Laud
- Mark Rowlinson – William Luff
- Julian Pike – Crusoe
- Richard Suart – John Barry
- Robert Carpenter-Turner – Dr. Stebbing, Guard, Farmer Denton
- Katharine Jackson – Mrs Palmer
- Jonathan Robarts – Judge
- Pat Conti – Mrs. Denton, Mrs. Cobbold, Lucy, Alice
