= Knobbly knees competition =

British beauty contest parody

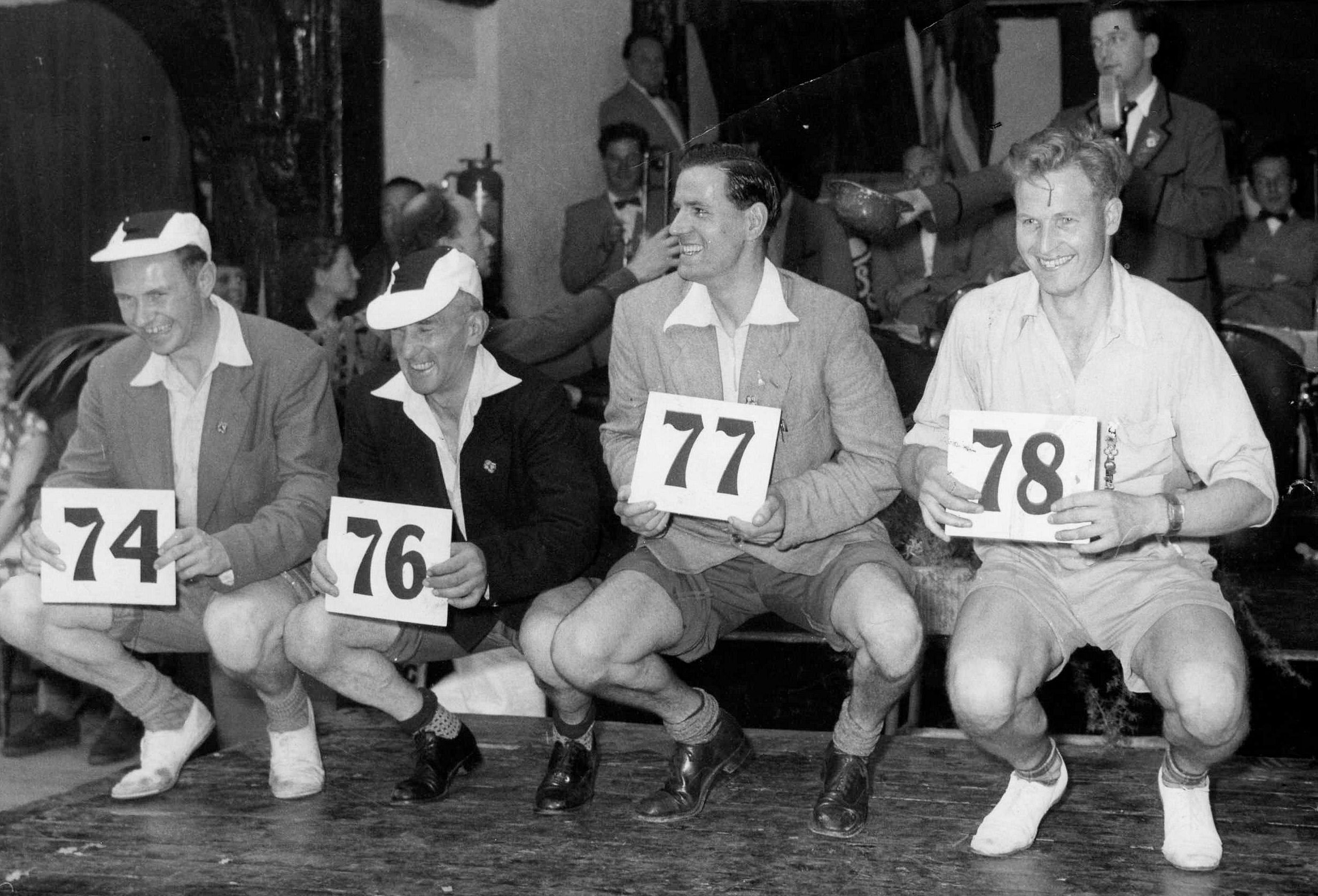
A knobbly knees competition at Butlin's, Skegness, in 1956. Contestant 78 was the winner.

A knobbly knees (or knobbliest knees) competition is a parody of a beauty contest, in which the winner is the person judged to have the knobbliest, or most misshapen, knees.

Such competitions were popular entertainments at British pre- and post-war era holiday camps such as Butlin's (where they were introduced in the 1930s) and Pontins. The competitions became a byword for the holiday camp lifestyle.

A June 1947 knobbliest knees contest at Butlin's Skegness camp was judged by Laurel and Hardy. The denouement of the 1973 British comedy-drama film The Best Pair of Legs in the Business—from which the film takes its title—relies on a character having participated in a knobbly knees competition.
