= Belstead House =

House in Pinewood, Suffolk, England

Coordinates: 52.0368°N 1.1064°E

Belstead House is a Grade II listed 16th/17th century house in Sprites Lane, Pinewood, Suffolk. It was bought by Major Quilter in 1901. Until 1920 it was known as Hill House and lay at the centre of a 102 acre farm. The building was remodelled by Harold Hooper and Garrard in 1936, during which much of the original building was lost, although it was in some ways expanded using material from other period houses available locally.

Belstead House was bought by East Suffolk County Council in 1948 to provide accommodation for High Court Judges visiting Ipswich. It was also used as venue for adult education, a use which increased when it was no longer used by the judges after 1974. Aside from use as a venue for residential courses, it was also used by Suffolk County Council.

== Redevelopment ==
However in 2012 Suffolk County Council bought Landmark House, in Whitehouse, Ipswich and then put Belstead House and other premises on the market. In 2015 the developer, Rural Community Housing Limited, expressed interest in the property, submitting a planning proposal to Babergh District Council to redevelop the building as part of a major redevelopment also including neighbouring land. Their plans included turning Belstead House itself into four large homes, which would be sold on the open market. However local residents and politicians expressed concern about the development creating problems due to limited local facilities and potential traffic problems.

Despite the Outline Planning Permission initially being rejected, it was subsequently granted on 25 November 2015. In 2019 Rural Community Housing Limited applied for Detailed Planning Permission.
