= CART =

CART or CarT may refer to:

== Organizations ==
- Canada Agricultural Review Tribunal, a Canadian regulatory appellate tribunal
- Center for Advanced Research and Technology, a high school in Clovis, California
- Centre for Appropriate Rural Technology, South Africa
- Championship Auto Racing Teams, a now-defunct sanctioning body for American open-wheel car racing
- Child Abduction Response Team, an American multi-agency law enforcement team.
- Christian African Relief Trust, a British aid organisation
- Coleshill Auxiliary Research Team, British historical research group
- Computer Analysis Response Team, a Federal Bureau of Investigation working group

== Science ==
- Chimeric antigen receptor T cell
- Classification and regression tree, a type of decision tree
- Cocaine- and amphetamine-regulated transcript, a neuropeptide
- Combination antiretroviral therapy, a type of treatment for HIV/AIDS
- Torulene dioxygenase, an enzyme

== Technology ==
- Communication access real-time translation, a speech-to-text conversion system

== Transport ==
- Campus Area Rapid Transit, formerly Cleveland Area Rapid Transit, serving the University of Oklahoma
- Clermont Area Rural Transit, now Clermont Transportation Connection
- Cooperative Alliance for Regional Transportation, a service of Manchester Transit Authority in New Hampshire

== Other uses ==
- CART, abbreviation for Churchie Art, an annual exhibition at Anglican Church Grammar School, Brisbane, Australia

== See also ==
- Cart (disambiguation)
