= Kertu (given name) =

Female given name

- Gender: Female
- Language: Estonian
- Name day: 17 March

Origin
- Origin: Variant of Gertrud
- Region of origin: Estonia

Other names
- Related names: Gerda, Gertrud, Kärdi, Kärt, Kerli, Kert, Ruuta, Truude, Truuta

Kertu is an Estonian feminine given name; an Estonian variant of the given name Gertud.

As of 1 January 2021, 1,268 women in Estonia have the first name Kertu. Kertu is the 144th most popular female name in the country. Kertu is most common in the 15–19 age group, where there are 22.19 per 10,000 inhabitants bearing the name. The name is most commonly found in Lääne County, where 14.10 per 10,000 inhabitants of the county bear the name.

Individuals bearing the name Kertu include:

- Kertu Ly Alnek (born 1999), swimmer
- Kertu Laak (born 1998), volleyball player
- Kertu Moppel (born 1985), director and actress
- Kertu Saks (born 1971), journalist, science book author
- Kertu Sillaste (born 1973), textile artist, illustrator and children's writer
- Kertu Tiitso (born 1971), hurdler
