= Descartes (disambiguation) =

René Descartes (1596–1650) was a French mathematician and philosopher.

Descartes or des Cartes may also refer to:

== Places ==
- Descartes, Indre-et-Loire, France
- Descartes (crater), on the Moon
  - Descartes Highlands, the surrounding area

== People with the surname ==
- Blanche Descartes, British mathematicians' collective pseudonym
- Francine Descartes (1635–1640), René Descartes' daughter

== Ships ==
- French frigate Descartes (1844–1867)
- French cruiser Descartes (1896–1920)
- René Descartes (ship), a France Télécom cable layer

== Other uses ==
- Descartes (plotting tool), computer software
- Descartes Editeur, a French game publishing company
- Descartes Systems Group, a Canadian multinational technology company
- University of Paris V: René Descartes, a university in Paris

== See also ==
- List of things named after René Descartes
- Descartes number, a number that is "almost" a perfect number
- Descartes Prize, the European prize for excellence in scientific research and science communication
- Descartes' rule of signs, a mathematical technique devised by René Descartes that is used to find the number of positive, negative, and imaginary roots of a polynomial
- Cartesian (disambiguation)
- Cartes (disambiguation)
- Carte (disambiguation)
- Cart (disambiguation)
- DES (disambiguation)
