= John D'Oyly =

John D'Oyly may refer to:

- Sir John D'Oyly, 1st Baronet, of Chislehampton (1640–1709), MP for Woodstock (UK Parliament constituency)
- Sir John D'Oyly, 1st Baronet, of Kandy (1774–1824), British colonial administrator
- Sir John D'Oyly, 2nd Baronet (1670–1746), of the D'Oyly baronets
- Sir John D'Oyly, 4th Baronet (1702–1773), of the D'Oyly baronets
- Sir John D'Oyly, 6th Baronet (1754–1818), MP for Ipswich
- Sir John D'Oyly, 8th Baronet (1794–1869), of the D'Oyly baronets
- Sir John D'Oyly, 13th Baronet (1900–1986), of the D'Oyly baronets
