= Cart (disambiguation) =

A cart is a two-wheeled vehicle or device designed for transport.

Cart may also refer to:

- Cart (film)
- Carts (film)
- River Cart, a river in Scotland
- Fidelipac, a type of audio tape cartridge used in broadcasting
- ROM cartridge, a removable component of an electronic device
- Baggage cart
- Golf cart
- Shopping cart
- Sling cart
- Cart, a term used for notices posted by tabloid talk shows to recruit guests
- Cart, slang word for Cannabis Vaporizer

== See also ==
- CART (disambiguation)
- Carting (disambiguation)
- Kart (disambiguation)
- Cartridge (disambiguation)
- Cartesian (disambiguation)
- Cartes (disambiguation)
- Carte (disambiguation)
