= Sir John D'Oyly, 1st Baronet =

Sir John D'Oyly, 1st Baronet may refer to:

- Sir John D'Oyly, 1st Baronet, of Chislehampton (1640–1709), of the D'Oyly baronets
- Sir John D'Oyly, 1st Baronet, of Kandy (1774–1824)
