= Carte =

Carte may refer to:

== People ==
- Alexander Carte (1805–1881), Irish British zoologist
- Anto Carte (1886–1954), Belgian painter
- Helen Carte (1852–1913), Scottish British businesswoman
- Richard Carte (1808–1891), British flute-maker
- Samuel Carte (1652–1740), English antiquarian
- Thomas Carte (1686–1754), English historian
- Omer Carte Qalib (1930–2020), Somali politician
- Carte Goodwin (born 1974), U.S. politician
- Carte Said (born 1997), Italian soccer player

== Other uses ==
- CARTE Museum (Cartographic Acquisition Research Teaching and Exhibition), Baton Rouge, Louisiana, USA
- Carte network, a French resistance network

== See also ==
- Deidre LaCarte, Canadian dancer
- Julio Lacarte Muró (1918–2016), Uruguayan diplomat
- Card (disambiguation)
- Cart (disambiguation)
- Cartes (disambiguation)
- Cartesian (disambiguation)
- Descartes (disambiguation), including des Cartes
- D'Oyly Carte (disambiguation)
- Carte blanche (disambiguation)
- À la carte (disambiguation)
