= Cartes (disambiguation) =

Cartes is a municipality located in the autonomous community of Cantabria, Spain.

Cartes or variant, may also refer to:

== People ==
- Horacio Cartes (born 1956), a Paraguayan businessman and president of Paraguay
- Luis Cartés (born 1998), a Uruguayan soccer player
- Roberto Cartes (born 1972), a former Chilean footballer

== Other uses ==
- Grupo Cartes (Spanish: Cartes Group), a Paraguayan business conglomerate

== See also ==
- Descartes (disambiguation), including des Cartes
- Cartesian (disambiguation)
- Carte (disambiguation)
- Cart (disambiguation)
