= Kart (disambiguation) =

Kart or KART or Go-kart or similar may refer to:

- Go-kart, a type of small four-wheeled vehicle, motorized or not
- Kart racing, a variant of open-wheel motorsport with small, open, four-wheeled vehicles called karts
- KART (AM), a radio station (1400 AM) licensed to Jerome, Idaho, United States
- Kart’, a town in Armenia
- Kart, Iran, a village in Taybad County, Razavi Khorasan Province, Iran
- Go-Kart Records, a record label
- Korea National University of Arts (K-ARTS), a national university in South Korea
- Watertown International Airport in Watertown, New York (ICAO: KART)

== See also ==
- Card (disambiguation)
- Cart (disambiguation)
- Kard, a type of Islamic knife
- Kart racing game, a video game genre
- Kärt, Estonian feminine given name
