= D'Oyly =

D'Oyly or Doiley is an English-language surname. It originates from the Norman French name d'Ouilly, from the place-name Ouilly in Calvados, Lower Normandy, France.

== List of persons with the surname ==
- Nigel D'Oyly, Lord of Oxford Castle and Wallingford Castle
- Robert D'Oyly (Osney), founder of Osney Abbey
- Robert D'Oyly, founder of Oxford Castle and High Sheriff of Berkshire
- Sir John D'Oyly, 6th Baronet of Shottisham was MP for Ipswich 1790–1796

== See also ==
- D'Oyly baronets, a number of British baronetcies
- D'Oyly Carte (disambiguation)
- Mr. Doiley, supposed inventor of the doily
- George D'Oyly Snow, schoolmaster and Bishop
- Guy D'Oyly-Hughes, British naval officer in the First World War and the Second World War
- Thomas D'Oyly Snow, British General in the First World War
- Flatulence, for which "d'Oyly" became Cockney rhyming slang through the rhyming of "d'Oyly Carte" with "fart" and subsequent omission of the second portion "Carte"
