= Warren D'Oyly =

Royal Navy officer during the First World War

Vice-Admiral Warren D'Oyly
- Born: 3 August 1867
- Died: 22 March 1950 (aged 82)
- Military career
- Allegiance: United Kingdom
- Branch: Royal Navy
- Rank: Vice-Admiral
- Commands: HMS Wildfire
- Conflicts: First World War

Vice-Admiral Warren Hastings D'Oyly (3 August 1867 – 22 March 1950) was a British officer of the Royal Navy who saw service in the First World War.

== Early life and family ==
Warren Hastings D'Oyly was born on 3 August 1867, the third son of Warren Hastings D'Oyly, later tenth Baronet, who worked in the Bengal Civil Service, and his wife Henrietta Mary Halliday, a daughter of Sir Frederick James Halliday, Lieutenant-Governor of Bengal. He was baptised at Bhagalpur, Bengal on 24 November 1867.

In 1912, D'Oyly married Sylvia Agnes Alicia Hart, daughter of General Sir Reginald Clare Hart. They had one son: Lieutenant Reginald Clare Hastings D'Oyly (1918–1941), who served in the Royal Navy during the Second World War and died on 31 March 1941, while stationed on HMS Bonaventure, which was sunk south of Crete.

== Naval career ==
D'Oyly was educated at Eastman's Royal Naval Academys and enrolled in the Royal Navy on 15 January 1881. He was promoted to lieutenant in 1891. He served in the South African War 1899–1902, in command of the composite gunboat HMS Thrush. In early 1902 he took her to help a British force in Nigeria re-open trade routes on the Lower Niger (River Niger Expedition), closed by piracy of the locals during the Aro-Anglo war. For his service he was mentioned in despatches by the commander of the British force during the war, and by the High Commissioner of other Nigeria. Promoted to commander on 26 June 1902, he was back in the United Kingdom when he was on 8 October 1902 appointed in command of HMS Wildfire, shore establishment at Sheerness, for duties with the Commander-in-Chief, The Nore.

He later took part in the Anglo-French expedition in 1905, and was promoted to captain in 1908. By 1913, D'Oyly was the captain of HMS Lancaster, an armoured cruiser. He was present at the Haitian insurrection of 1914, before serving in the First World War. By 1917, he was the captain of HMS Donegal, another armoured cruiser. After the conclusion of the First World War, D'Oyly was listed in the London Gazette as being one of the "Officers and Men ... brought to the notice of the Admiralty for valuable services in the prosecution of the War". He was promoted to rear-admiral in 1919 and vice-admiral in 1925.

D'Oyly died at Clare Mount in Broadstone, Dorset, on 22 March 1950. He left an estate worth over £2,000.

== Ancestry ==
Ancestors of Warren D'Oyly

8. Sir John Hadley D'Oyly, sixth Baronet
4. Sir John Hadley D'Oyly, eight Baronet
9. Diana Rochfort
2. Sir Warren Hastings D'Oyly, tenth Baronet
10. John Fendall
5. Mary Fendall
11. ?
1. Vice-Admiral Warren Hastings D'Oyly
12. Thomas Halliday
6. Sir Frederick James Halliday
13. Maria Morrice
3. Henrietta Halliday
14. General John Alexander Paul MacGregor
7. Eliza MacGregor
15. ?
