= HMS Ringdove (1889) =

Gunboat of the Royal Navy

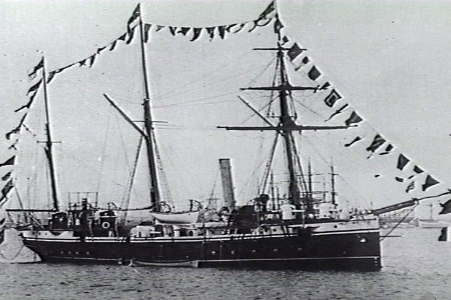
- HMS Ringdove dressed overall

History

United Kingdom
- Name: HMS Ringdove
- Builder: Devonport Dockyard
- Laid down: 1 June 1888
- Launched: 30 April 1889
- Fate: Sold in 1920

General characteristics
- Class & type: Redbreast-class gunboat
- Displacement: 805 tons
- Length: 165 ft 0 in (50.3 m) pp
- Beam: 31 ft 0 in (9.4 m)
- Draught: 11 ft 0 in (3.4 m) min, 13 ft 9 in (4.2 m) max
- Installed power: 1,200 ihp (890 kW)
- Propulsion: Triple-expansion steam engine; 2 × boilers; Single screw
- Speed: 13 kn (24 km/h)
- Range: 2,500 nmi (4,600 km) at 10 kn (19 km/h)
- Complement: 76
- Armament: 6 × 4-inch/25-pounder QF guns; 4 × machine guns

HMS Ringdove was a Redbreast-class gunboat of the Royal Navy, built at Devonport Dockyard and launched on 30 April 1889.

She commenced service on the Australia Station on 5 March 1890, under the command of R. F. Ayscough. She left the Australia Station in February 1901 and returned to England, where she was paid off at Devonport 10 June 1901 and placed in the fleet reserve to be refit at Haulbowline. She became a tender to HMS Vernon and was converted into a salvage vessel in 1915 and was renamed HMS Melita.

== Fate ==
She was sold to the Ship Salvage Corporation on 22 January 1920 and renamed Telima. She was broken up in 1926.
