= Frederick Learmonth =

Royal Navy Admiral (1866–1941)

Admiral Sir Frederick Learmonth KBE CB
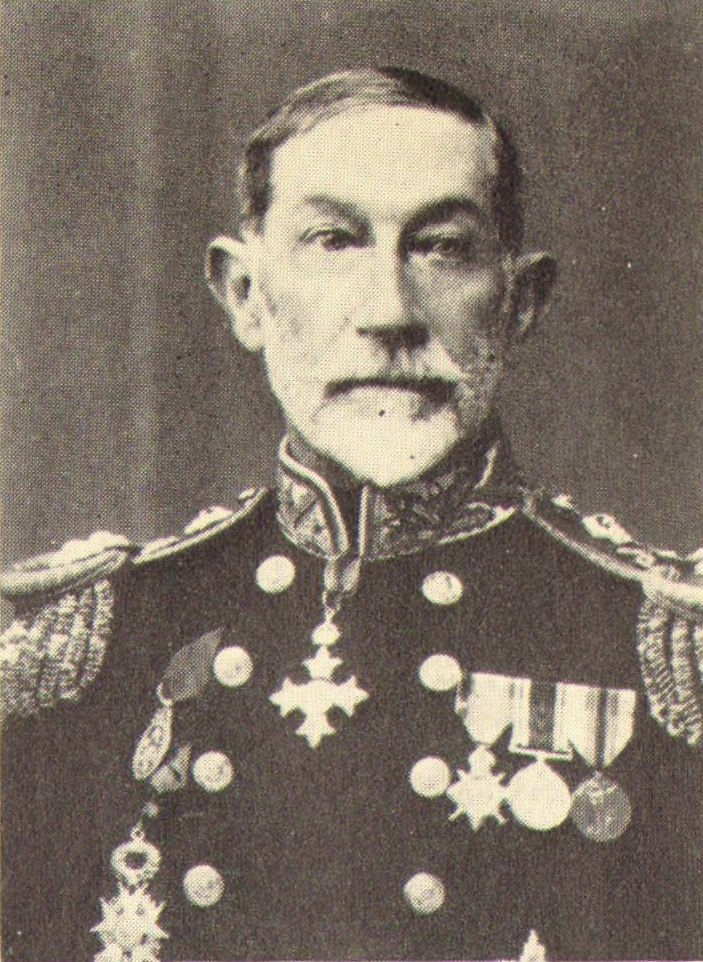
- Born: 14 January 1866
- Died: 3 June 1941 (aged 75)
- Military career
- Allegiance: United Kingdom
- Branch: Royal Navy
- Rank: Admiral
- Commands: HMS Egeria
- Awards: Knight Commander of the Order of the British Empire; Companion of the Order of the Bath

Admiral Sir Frederick Charles Learmonth KBE CB (14 January 1866 – 3 June 1941) was a Royal Navy officer.

== Career ==
Frederick Learmonth was the younger son of Colonel Alexander Learmonth, MP and Charlotte Lyons. He joined the Royal Navy as a cadet in 1879, was made a midshipman in 1881, sub-lieutenant in 1885 and promoted to lieutenant in 1887. At that time he was serving in the Royal Yacht Victoria and Albert He started surveying in 1890 in Borneo and the Anamba Islands under Arthur Mostyn Field in HMS Egeria. From 1894 he worked on the west coast of Africa and then in North America and the West Indies under George Henry Richards. Between 1896 and 1899 he was back on Egeria in British Columbia under Morris Smyth. In March 1900 he was posted to the survey vessel HMS Research, and on 14 July 1900 he was promoted to commander. His first command was HMS Goldfinch, a converted gunboat which he commissioned in 1902 for surveys on the west coast of Africa and the Mediterranean. He then commanded Egeria in British Columbia from 1905. He was promoted to captain on 31 December 1906.

In 1907, Learmonth surveyed the Gardner Canal on the British Columbia Coast in preparation for a proposed terminal of the Grand Trunk Pacific Railway at Kitimat. He named the first part of the Canal Alan Reach, after Admiral Alan, Lord Gardner. He went on to name a number of locations in and around the canal during his survey of the area, often providing names relating to Gardner and men who were serving in Egeria. He continued in command of the survey ship into the following year, surveying Zayas Island. He left the ship later on in 1909. He was next in HMS Merlin in Borneo in 1909–1911, and then on the North Sea Banks in HMS Hearty and Endeavour until 1914.

During World War I Learmonth was Captain Superintendent of Submarine Defences, later Director of Fixed Defences. He was particularly concerned with net defences, both in British and Allied waters. The adoption of the convoy system meant that large numbers of vessels would be concentrated at the assembly ports, and were vulnerable to U-boat attack until defences were established. This was rapidly achieved, not only for ports in Britain and Ireland, but in Canada and West Africa. The system was also used by the USA. He was awarded the CBE then the CB for this work.

Learmonth was appointed Hydrographer of the Navy in September 1919, a post he held until 1924. He was promoted to vice-admiral 1923. During this period four new survey ships were commissioned for working in home waters, converted from Aberdare class minesweepers. One of these, HMS Kellett was equipped with echo sounding equipment. Sea trials were successful, and the system was fitted in other surveying vessels. Learmonth proposed that new ships should also be ordered to replace the old and very unsatisfactory sailing vessels in use overseas, but in the end existing 24-class sloops were converted.

On his retirement, Learmonth became the Admiralty representative on the Port of London Authority. He was promoted to Knight Commander of the [Order of the British Empire (KBE) in the 1925 Birthday Honours, and was promoted Admiral on the retired list in 1929. He died in London in 1941.

Nautical charts from surveys by Learmonth
Calabar River, surveyed in HMS Goldfinch in 1903

Part of the Ionian Sea, surveyed in HMS Goldfinch in 1904

North Borneo, surveyed in HMS Merlin in 1909-1912
