= Redbreast-class gunboat =

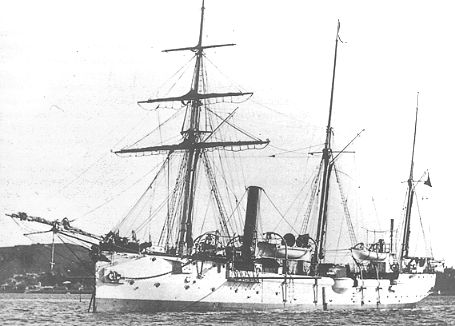
- HMS Sparrow

Class overview
- Name: Redbreast-class gunboats
- Builders: Pembroke Dockyard; Sheerness Dockyard; Devonport Dockyard; Scotts of Greenock
- Operators: Royal Navy; New Zealand Government; British Merchant Navy
- Cost: Between £38,000 (Widgeon); and £39,300 (Ringdove)
- Built: 1889
- In commission: 1889–1921
- Completed: 9
- Lost: 1

General characteristics
- Class & type: Redbreast-class first-class gunvessel
- Displacement: 805 tons
- Length: 165 ft 0 in (50.3 m) pp
- Beam: 31 ft 0 in (9.4 m)
- Draught: 11 ft 0 in (3.35 m) min, 13 ft 9 in (4.19 m) max
- Installed power: 1,200 ihp (890 kW)
- Propulsion: Triple expansion steam engine; 2 × boilers; Single screw
- Sail plan: Barquentine-rigged
- Speed: 13 kn (24 km/h)
- Range: 2,500 nmi (4,600 km) at 10 kn (19 km/h)
- Complement: 76
- Armament: Magpie, Redbreast, Redpole & Ringdove: 6 × BL 4-inch (101.6 mm) 25-pounder guns; 4 × machine guns; Lapwing, Goldfinch, Thrush, Widgeon & Sparrow: 6 × 4-inch/25-pounder QF guns; 2 × 3-pounder QF guns; 2 × machine guns

The Redbreast class comprised nine first-class screw-driven composite gunboats built for the Royal Navy in 1889, mounting six guns.

== Construction ==
=== Design ===
The Redbreast class were designed by Sir William Henry White, the Royal Navy Director of Naval Construction in 1888. The hull was of composite construction, that is, iron keel, frames, stem and stern posts with wooden planking. These were the last class of composite-hulled gunboats built for the Royal Navy - the next class of gunboat, the Bramble-class gunboat of 1898, was of steel construction.

=== Propulsion ===
The class was fitted with a triple-expansion reciprocating steam engine developing 1,200 indicated horsepower, sufficient to propel them at 13 kn (24 km/h) through a single screw.

=== Sail plan ===
The class was given a barquentine rig.

=== Armament ===
The first four ships were armed with six 4-inch/25-pounder (25cwt) quick firing guns and four machine guns. The last five had an additional pair of 3-pounder quick firing guns in place of two of the machine guns.

== Ships ==
| Name | Ship builder | Launched | Fate |
|---|---|---|---|
| Magpie | Pembroke Dockyard | 15 March 1889 | Boom defence vessel in 1902. Gunboat in 1915, depot ship in October 1915. Sold to Duguid & Stewart on 29 December 1921 |
| Redbreast | Pembroke Dockyard | 25 April 1889 | Sold in 1910 |
| Redpole | Pembroke Dockyard | 13 June 1889 | Served on the China Station. Sold to Cox for breaking at Falmouth on 15 May 1906 |
| Ringdove | Devonport Dockyard | 30 April 1889 | Became a salvage vessel on 7 December 1915, renamed Melita. Sold to Ship Salvage Corporation on 22 January 1920, and renamed Telima, she was broken up in the second quarter of 1926. |
| Lapwing | Devonport Dockyard | 12 April 1889 | Sold at Bombay on 10 November 1910 |
| Goldfinch | Sheerness Dockyard | 18 May 1889 | Survey vessel in February 1902. Sold for breaking on 14 May 1907 |
| Thrush | Scott's, Greenock | 22 June 1889 | Coastguard in 1906, cable ship in 1915, salvage vessel in 1916. Wrecked off Glenarm, Northern Ireland on 11 April 1917 |
| Widgeon | Pembroke Dockyard | 9 August 1889 | Sold to Castle for breaking at Charlton on 15 May 1906 |
| Sparrow | Scott's, Greenock | 26 September 1889 | Transferred to New Zealand as a training ship on 10 July 1906, renamed Amokura. Sold as a coal hulk in February 1922. Abandoned in St Omer Bay. |

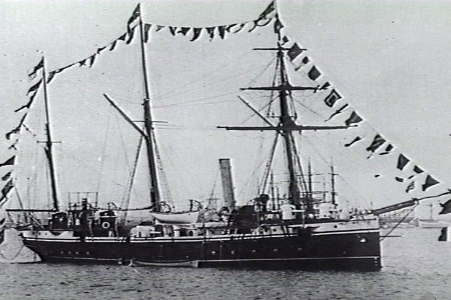
HMS Ringdove dressed overall at Melbourne in 1896
