= HMS Goldfinch (1889) =

Gunboat of the Royal Navy

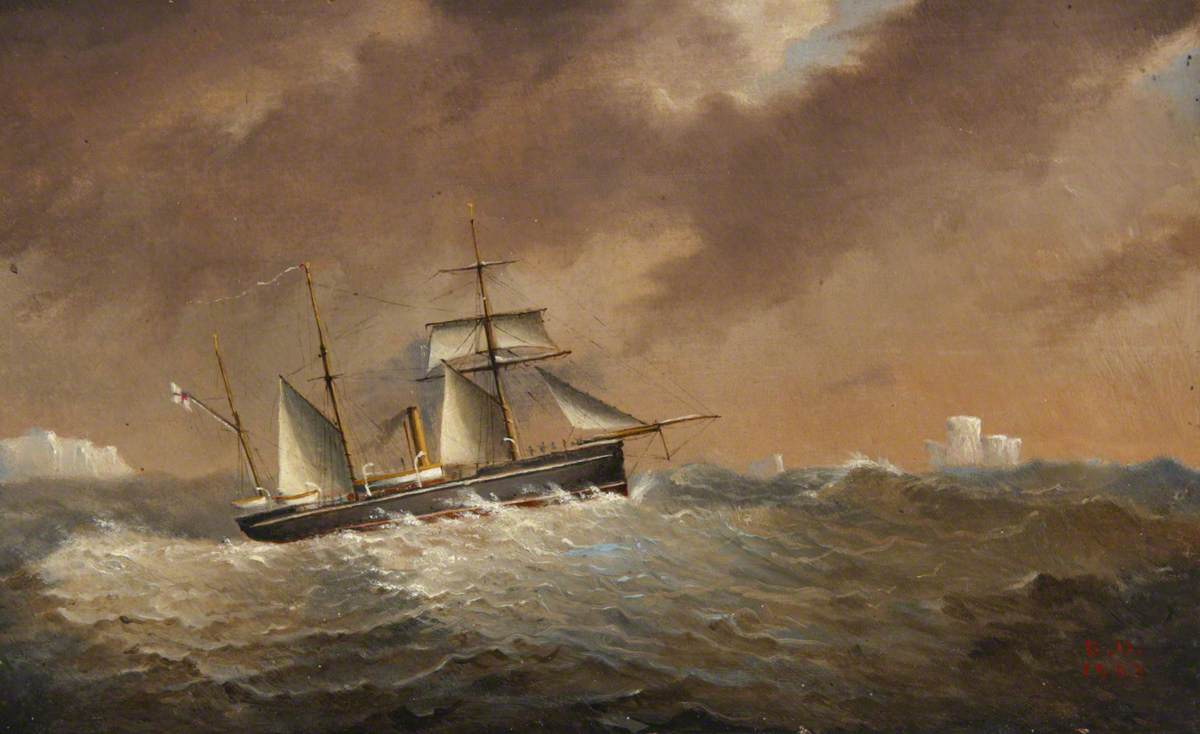
- The gunboat HMS Goldfinch, a painting by William Bloomfield Douglas

History

United Kingdom
- Name: HMS Goldfinch
- Builder: Sheerness Dockyard
- Cost: £39,300
- Launched: 18 May 1889
- Commissioned: 1890
- Fate: Sold 14 May 1907 for breaking

General characteristics
- Class & type: Redbreast-class gunboat
- Displacement: 805 tons
- Length: 165 ft 0 in (50.3 m) pp
- Beam: 31 ft 0 in (9.4 m)
- Draught: 11 ft 0 in (3.35 m) min, 13 ft 9 in (4.19 m) max
- Installed power: 1,200 ihp (890 kW)
- Propulsion: Triple expansion steam engine; 2 × boilers; Single screw
- Sail plan: Barquentine-rigged
- Speed: 13 kn (24 km/h)
- Range: 2,500 nmi (4,600 km) at 10 kn (19 km/h)
- Complement: 76
- Armament: 6 × 4-inch/25-pounder QF guns; 2 × 3-pounder (47 mm) QF guns; 2 × machine guns

HMS Goldfinch was a Redbreast-class gunboat of the Royal Navy, built at Sheerness Dockyard and launched on 18 May 1889.

== Service ==
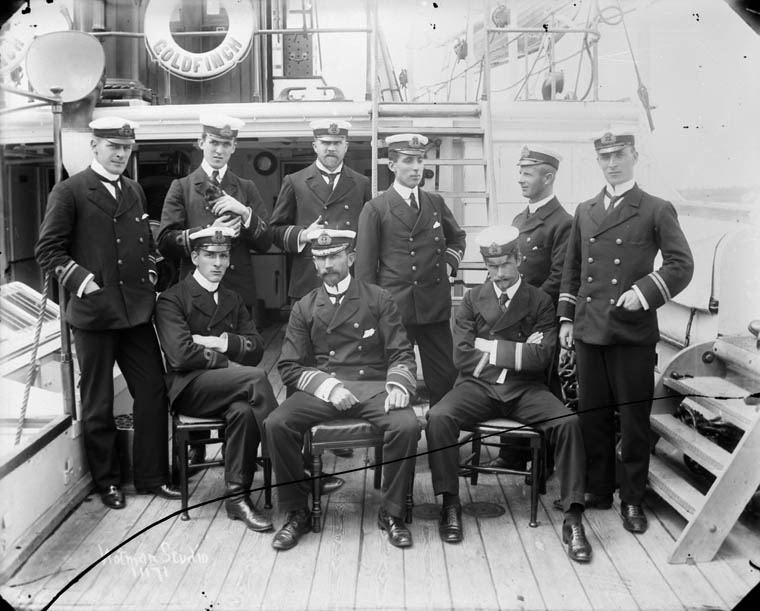
Officers aboard Goldfinch at Halifax, Nova Scotia, Canada, early 1900s

She commenced service on the Australia Station in March 1890. She left the Australia Station in August 1899 and returned to England. She was converted into a survey vessel in January 1902, and commissioned by Commander Frederick Charles Learmonth on 4 February 1902. She left Sheerness for the Mediterranean later that month on surveying duties. In October 1902 she left Malta for the West Coast of Africa, visiting Sierra Leone and Calabar in December.

== Fate ==
Goldfinch returned to Sheerness for refitting for continued service in 1906, but was found to be in poor condition and the sloop Mutine was refitted as a survey ship to replace her. Goldfinch was sold on 14 May 1907 for breaking up.
