= Barthelemy Lafon =

French-American architect and privateer

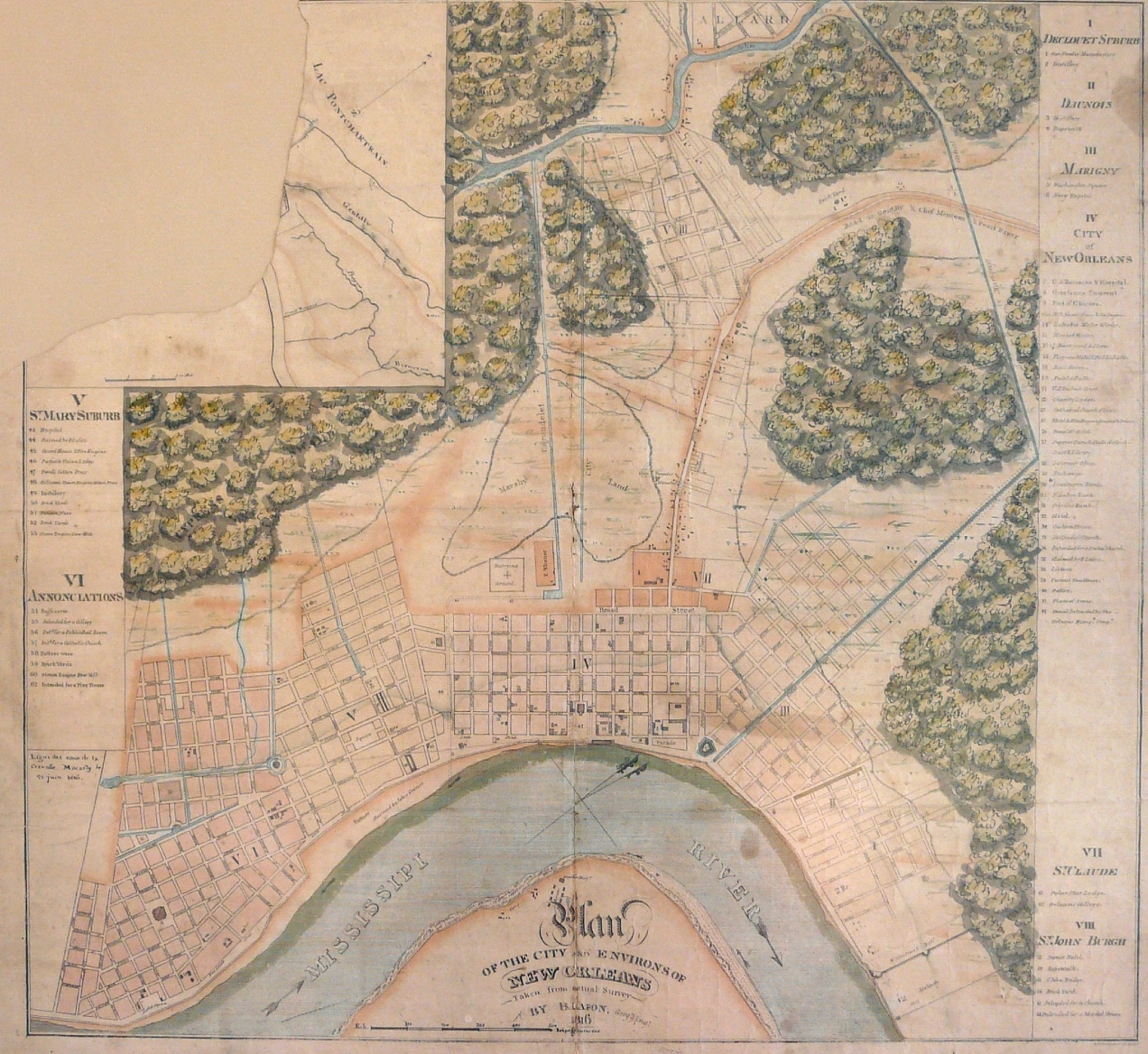
Example of Lafon's Maps of New Orleans

Barthélémy Lafon (1769–1820) was a notable French architect, engineer, city planner, and surveyor in New Orleans, Louisiana. He appears to have had a double life, as a respectable architect, engineer, and citizen; but also as a privateer, smuggler, and pirate. In later life his association with piracy, specifically with Jean Lafitte and Pierre Lafitte became public knowledge.

== Life and career ==
Lafon was born in Villepinte, France, and traveled to New Orleans around 1790. He designed several public buildings, including public baths (plans submitted in 1797, but the bath house was never built) and a lighthouse, and numerous private homes (including the Benachi cotton brokers' house and the Vincent Rillieux house).

After the Louisiana Purchase in 1803, with the Mississippi River open to free trade, land owners just upriver from the Vieux Carré realized that the old quarter dominated by the Spanish and French could not contain the great number of Americans who were now flocking to the city, and they retained Lafon to subdivide their property and create an American suburb. From 1806 to 1809, Lafon also served as deputy surveyor of Orleans Parish, during the territorial period prior to statehood.

He prepared elaborate plans for what is today known as the Lower Garden District. His designs crossed the boundaries of five plantations (Soule, LaCourse, Annunciation, Nuns, and Panis), to include all properties up to Felicity Street. A lover of the classics, Lafon named his streets after the nine muses of Greek mythology: Calliope, Clio, Erato, Thalia, Melpomene, Terpsichore, Euterpe, Polymnia, and Urania. His sophisticated plan featuring tree-lined canals, fountains, churches, markets, a grand classical school, and a coliseum; but few of these features were ever realized. However, the grid pattern of streets survives, as do the parks and some of the street names leading to Coliseum Square. In 2014–15, one of the neighborhood association's projects was to restore the Lafon Fountain in Coliseum Square (installed c.1976), with plans to restore two other nearby fountains.

Parts of the Bywater and Bayou St. John neighborhoods were also planned by Lafon. His professional services included mapmaking, designing the plan for Donaldsonville in 1806, and surveying and recommending improvements to the fortifications of New Orleans during the War of 1812.

Lafon had a long-term relationship with Modeste Foucher, a free woman of color. When Lafon wrote his will in 1809, he acknowledged two mixed-race children he had with Foucher, Pierre Barthélemy and Carmélite. Thomy Lafon, a Creole of color who was the son of Modeste Foucher, was likely named after Barthélemy Lafon, although Thomy's father was Pierre Larande.

As a businessman and investor, Lafon became a rich man and was noted for his philanthropy. However, after the Battle of New Orleans early in 1815, he did not resume his architectural career. Instead, he turned to piracy and smuggling, working in league with the notorious brothers, Pierre (1770–1821) and Jean Lafitte (c.1780–c.1823).

Lafon died of yellow fever in New Orleans on September 29, 1820, and was buried in Saint Louis Cemetery Number 1.

== See also ==
- CARTE Museum, whose collection includes maps by Barthelemy Lafon
- List of streets of New Orleans
