= Carting =

Carting may refer to:

- Carting, the transport of heavy goods by horse-drawn cart
- Drafting (dog), a dog sport which is also called carting
- A component of the waste management industry, specifically the collection and transportation of waste

== Other uses ==
- Carting Island, an island which is part of Connecticut, USA

== See also ==
- Carting or karting are activities using a go-kart
