= Cartesian =

Cartesian means of or relating to the French philosopher René Descartes—from his Latinized name Cartesius. It may refer to:

== Mathematics ==
- Cartesian closed category, a closed category in category theory
- Cartesian coordinate system, modern rectangular coordinate system
- Cartesian diagram, a construction in category theory
- Cartesian geometry, now more commonly called analytic geometry
- Cartesian morphism, formalisation of pull-back operation in category theory
- Cartesian oval, a curve
- Cartesian product, a direct product of two sets
- Cartesian product of graphs, a binary operation on graphs
- Cartesian tree, a binary tree in computer science

== Philosophy ==
- Cartesian anxiety, a hope that studying the world will give us unchangeable knowledge of ourselves and the world
- Cartesian circle, a potential mistake in reasoning
- Cartesian doubt, a form of methodical skepticism as a basis for philosophical rigor
- Cartesian dualism, the philosophy of the distinction between mind and body
  - Cartesianism, the philosophy of René Descartes
  - Cartesianists, followers of Cartesianism
- Cartesian Meditations, a work by Edmund Husserl
- Cartesian linguistics, a work by Noam Chomsky
- Cartesian theatre, a derisive view of Cartesian dualism coined by Daniel Dennett

== Science ==
- Cartesian diver, a science experiment demonstrating buoyancy and the ideal gas law
- Cartesian physics, attempts to explain gravity without a need for action at distance

== See also ==
- Cart (disambiguation)
- Carte (disambiguation)
- Cartes (disambiguation)
- Descartes (disambiguation)
