= HMS Thrush (1889) =

Gunboat of the Royal Navy

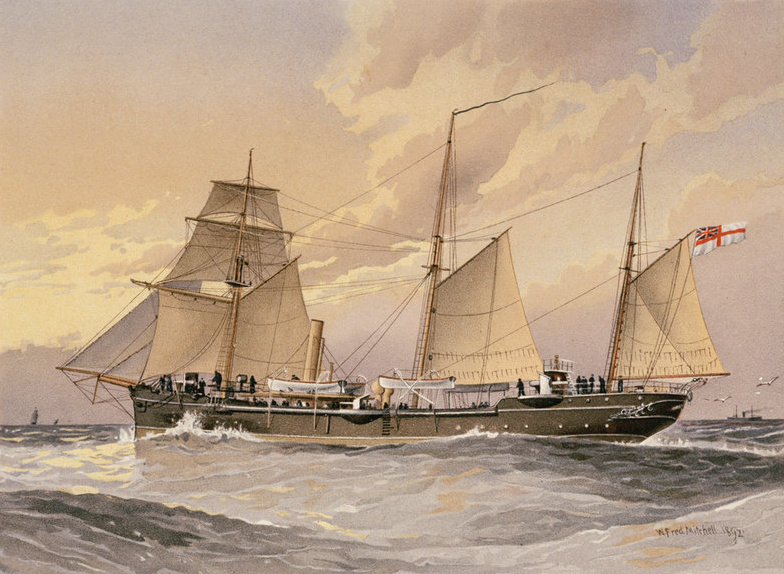
- HMS Thrush, First Class gunboat by W. Fred Mitchell

History

United Kingdom
- Name: Thrush
- Builder: Scotts, Greenock
- Cost: £39,000
- Yard number: 262
- Launched: 22 June 1889
- Reclassified: Coastguard 1906; Cable ship 1915; Salvage vessel 1916
- Fate: Wrecked on 11 April 1917

General characteristics
- Class & type: Redbreast-class gunboat
- Displacement: 805 tons
- Length: 165 ft 0 in (50.3 m) pp
- Beam: 31 ft 0 in (9.4 m)
- Draught: 11 ft 0 in (3.35 m) min, 13 ft 9 in (4.19 m) max
- Installed power: 1,200 ihp (890 kW)
- Propulsion: Triple expansion steam engine; 2 × boilers; Single screw
- Sail plan: Barquentine-rigged
- Speed: 13 kn (24 km/h)
- Range: 2,500 nmi (4,600 km) at 10 kn (19 km/h)
- Complement: 76
- Armament: 6 × 4-inch/25-pounder QF guns; 2 × 3-pounder QF guns; 2 × machine guns

HMS Thrush was a Redbreast-class composite gunboat, the third ship of the name to serve in the Royal Navy.

== Design and construction ==
The Redbreast class were designed by Sir William Henry White, the Royal Navy Director of Naval Construction in 1888. Thrush was launched on 22 June 1889 at Greenock. Her triple-expansion reciprocating steam engine was built by the Greenock Foundry, and developed 1,200 indicated horsepower (890 kW), sufficient to propel her at 13 knots (24 km/h; 15 mph) through her single screw.

== Career ==
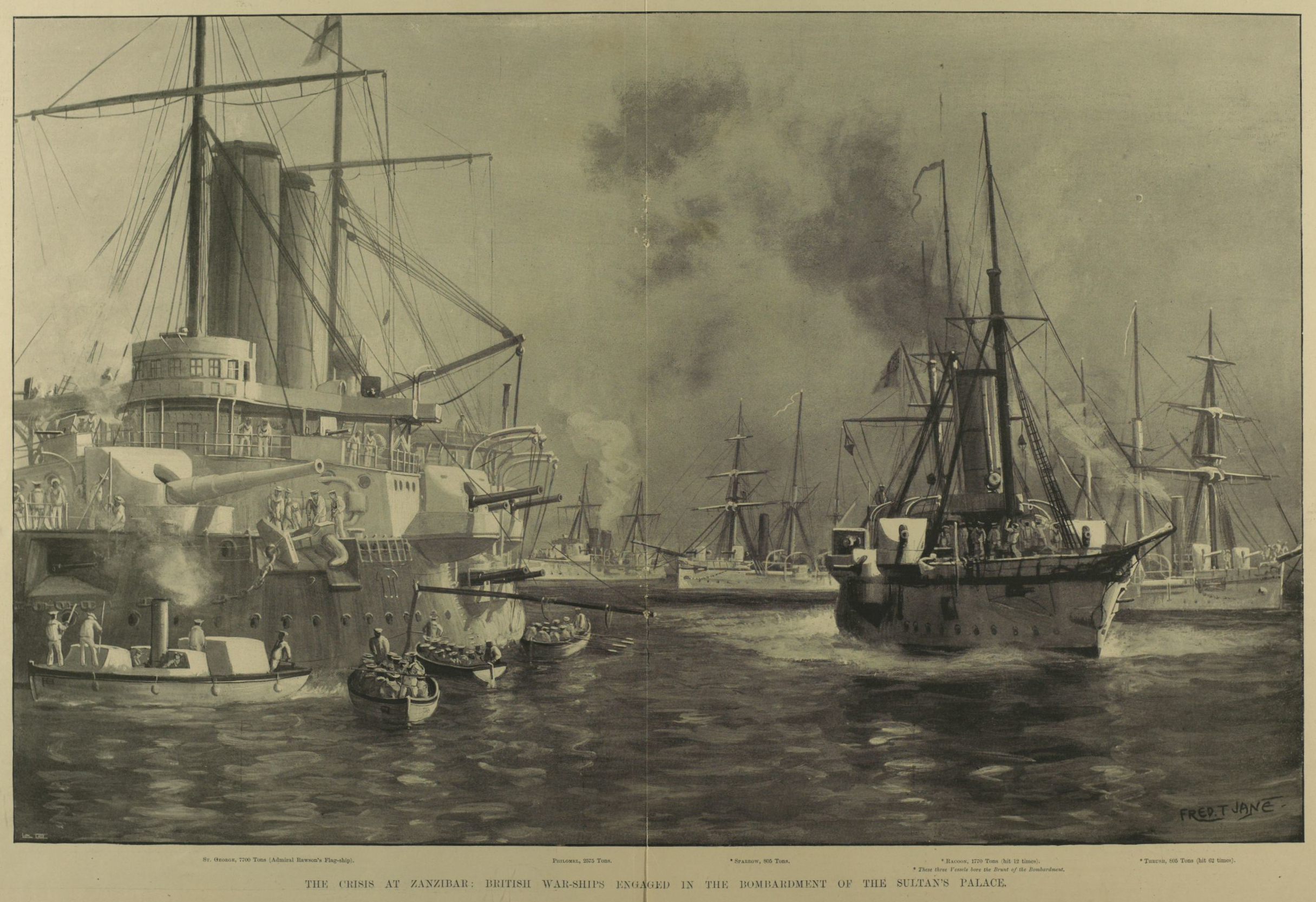
The Crisis at Zanzibar, British War-Ships engaged in the Bombardment of the Sultan's Palace; Thrush on the far right

Her first station was the North America and West Indies Station based at the Royal Naval Dockyard in Bermuda and Halifax, Nova Scotia, under the command of Prince George, later to become King George V of the United Kingdom. Thrush arrived at Bermuda with Prince George in command on 18 July 1890, with a torpedo boat in tow, and later proceeded to Halifax. In 1896 Thrush, along with Sparrow, played a part in the 40-minute Anglo-Zanzibar War. She was also on active service during the Second Boer War, which lasted between October 1899 and June 1902 where she was commanded by Lieutenant Warren Hastings D'Oyly. In early 1902 she helped a British force in Nigeria re-open trade routes on the Lower Niger, closed by piracy of some locals. Lieutenant Hector Lloyd Watts-Jones was appointed in command on 5 July 1902.

From 1906 Thrush worked for HM Coastguard before becoming a cable ship in 1915. She then became a salvage ship in 1916.

In January 1917, Thrush was involved in the dramatic rescue of 46 submariners and shipyard officials, from the sunken HMS K13. The unusual 'steam-powered', and newly built submarine suffered an uncontrolled descent to the bottom of the Gareloch, on the Firth of Clyde, during sea trials. Thrush was called in from a nearby mooring. Along with Gossamer and Ranger, they were able to partially raise the stricken vessel with cables, just enough to allow rescue of more than half the people on board.

Thrush wrecked off Glenarm in Northern Ireland on 11 April 1917 in a snow storm. Her scattered wreckage was discovered by divers in 1969 at a point 50 yards (46 m) off shore and at depths of 30–40 feet (9.1–12.2 m).
