= D'Oyly Carte =

D'Oyly Carte may refer to any of the following:

== People ==
- Richard D'Oyly Carte, Victorian theatrical impresario and hotelier
- Rupert D'Oyly Carte, Richard's son, English hotelier and proprietor of the D'Oyly Carte Opera Company
- Helen Carte
- Bridget D'Oyly Carte, Rupert's daughter, English hotelier and proprietor of the D'Oyly Carte Opera Company

== Other uses ==
- D'Oyly Carte Opera Company
- D'Oyly Carte Island in the River Thames, England, UK

== See also ==
- Gilbert and Sullivan
- Savoy Hotel
- Savoy Theatre
- D'Oyly
- Carte (disambiguation)
