= À la carte (disambiguation) =

À la carte is a French expression meaning "from the card", and is used in restaurant terminology.

A la Carte may also refer to:

- A La Carte (group), a German disco trio formed in 1978
- A la Carte (Triumvirat album), 1978
- À la Carte (Erste Allgemeine Verunsicherung album), 1984
- A la Carte (Kenny Burrell album)
- À la carte (EP), a 2002 EP by Fujifabric
- Alacarte, a GNOME menu editor
- "A La Cart", an episode of the American crime drama CSI: Crime Scene Investigation
- "A La Carte", an episode of Z-Cars
- A-la-carte, a music service selling individual songs
- A la carte pay television, a pricing model where cable and satellite television customers subscribe to individually selected channels

== See also ==
- Carte (disambiguation)
- Card (disambiguation)
