= Sir John D'Oyly, 4th Baronet =

Baronet in England (1702–1773)

- Born: 1702
- Died: 1773 (aged 70–71)

Sir John D'Oyly (1702 – 1773) was the 4th and last D'Oyly baronet of Chislehampton.

== Early life and education ==
John D'Oyly was the son of Sir John D'Oyly, 2nd Baronet of Chislehampton and Susanna Putt. He was educated at John Roysse's Free School in Abingdon, (now Abingdon School) and later Merton College, Oxford (fellow and Master of Arts).

== Career ==
He was Rector of Cuxham, Oxfordshire.

== Peerage ==
He succeeded his brother Sir Thomas D'Oyly, 3rd Baronet, to the title in 1759, was unmarried and the baronetcy became extinct upon his death in 1773.

Baronetage of England
Preceded by Thomas D'Oyly	Baronet (of Chislehampton); 1759–1773	Extinct

== See also ==
- List of Old Abingdonians
