= Ouilly =

Ouilly is an element in several place-names in Calvados, Lower Normandy, France:

- Ouilly-le-Vicomte
- Ouilly-le-Tesson
- Ouilly-du-Houley
- Pont-d'Ouilly

d'Ouilly is the origin of the English surnames d'Oyly and Doiley:

- The D'Oyly baronets, a number of British baronetcies.
- Richard D'Oyly Carte, Victorian theatrical impresario

This surname is further given to:

- D'Oyly Carte Island, an island in the River Thames, England.
- The doily, an ornamental table mat supposedly invented by a Mr Doiley
