= Kertu Sillaste =

Estonian artist

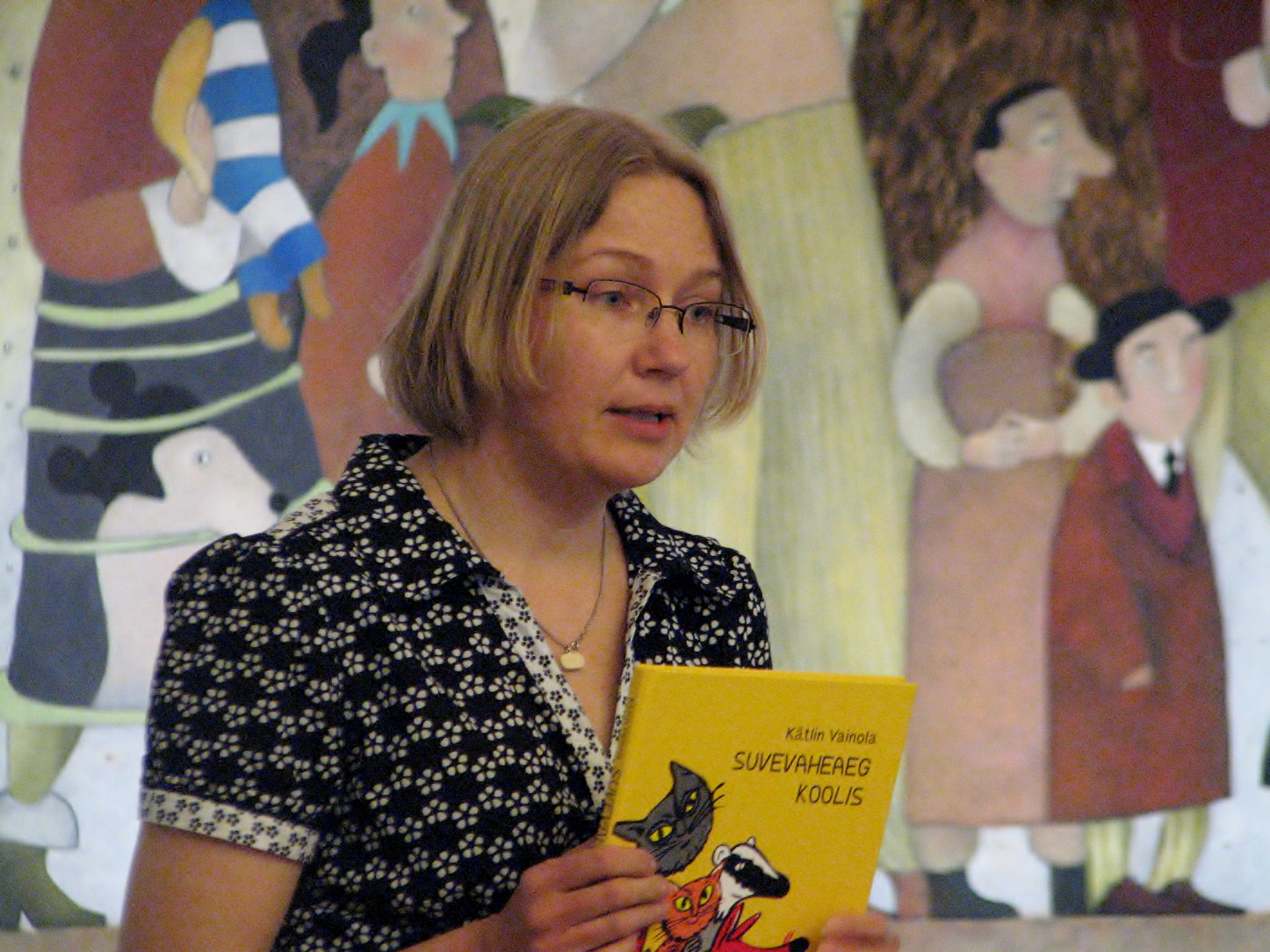
Kertu Sillaste is 2014

Kertu Sillaste (born 24 October 1973) is an Estonian textile artist, illustrator, and children's author.

== Life and career ==
Sillaste was born in Tallinn. She graduated from Estonian Academy of Arts, studying textile design. Afterwards, she studied tapestry at the École supérieure des arts appliqués Duperré in Paris. Afterwards, she studied at Tallinn University (master's degree), studying art education.

In total, she has illustrated at least 16 works. She has done long-time collaboration with the children's magazine Täheke.

In 2016, she was listed in White Ravens catalogue.

== Selected works ==
- 2012: Pannkoogiraamat, Päike ja Pilv
- 2015: Ei ole nii!, Päike ja Pilv
- 2016: Igaüks teeb isemoodi kunsti, Päike ja Pilv
- 2018: Mina olen kunstnik, Koolibri
- 2019: Loomakesed läksid linna, Hea Lugu
