= Cart =

Wheeled conveyance for loads

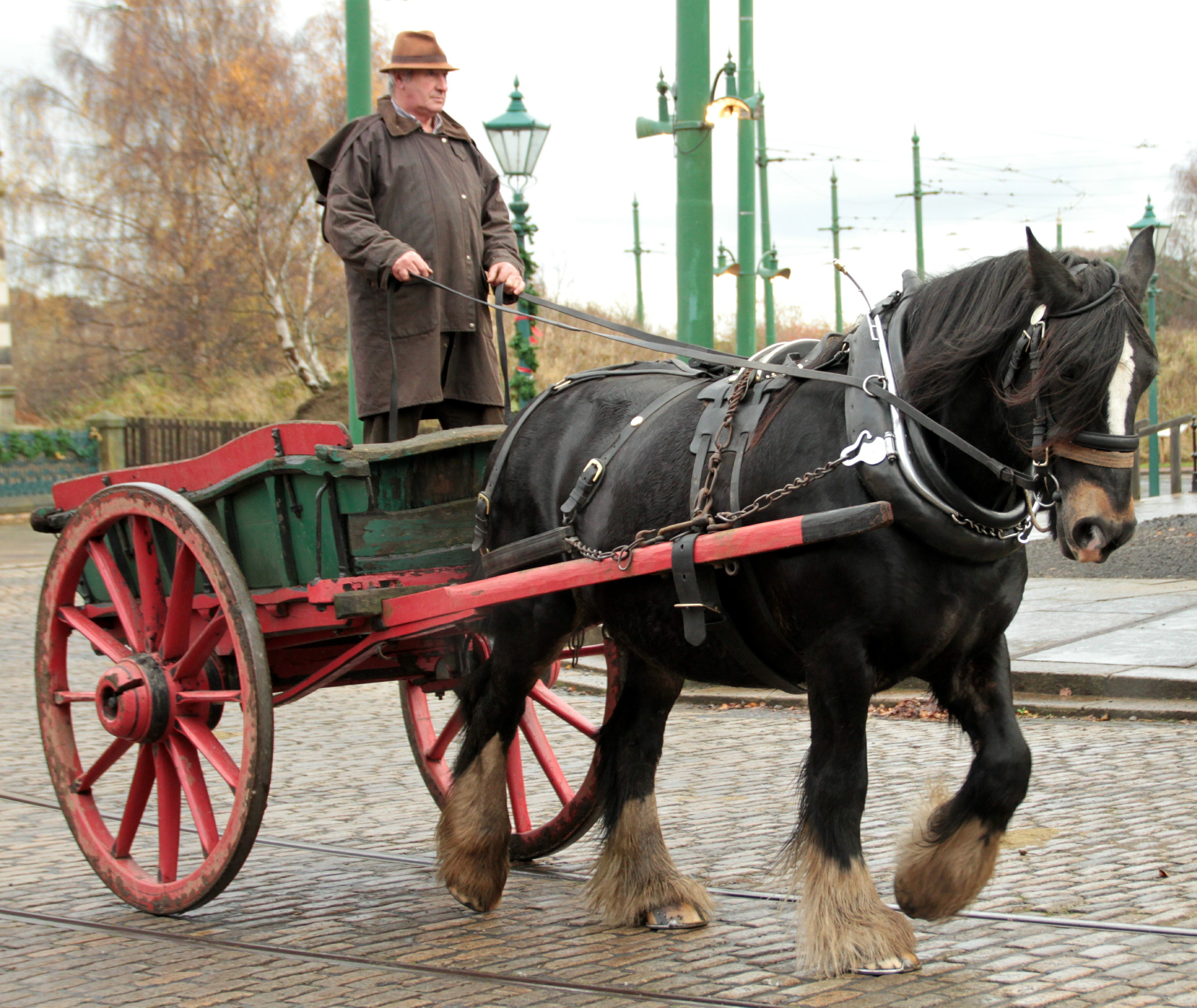
Horse and cart (England, 2013)

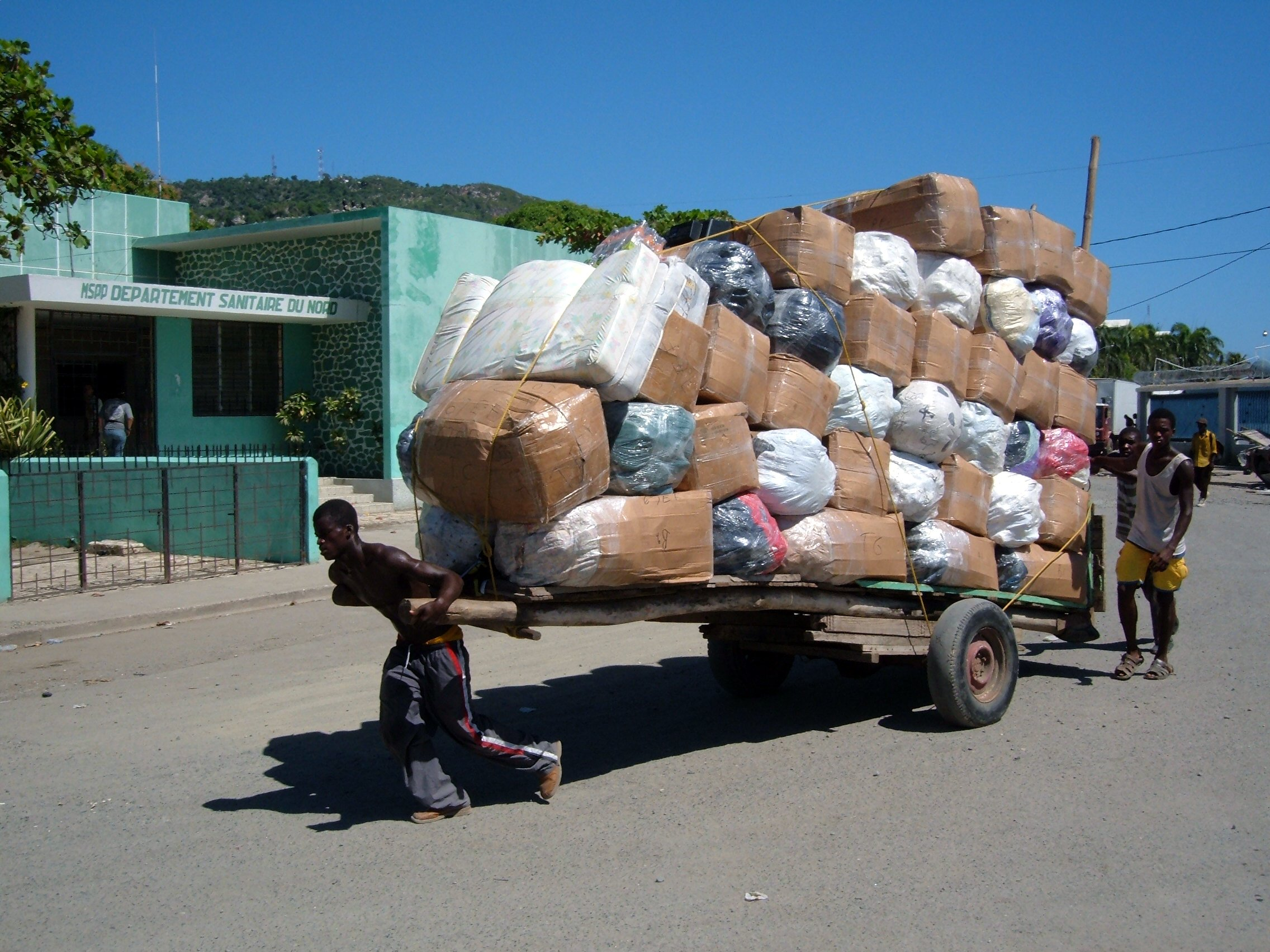
Dockworkers and hand cart (Haiti, 2006)

A cart is a two-wheeled vehicle designed for transport. It can be pulled by humans or draught animals such as horses, donkeys, mules and oxen, or smaller animals such as goats and large dogs.

Carting is the transport of goods by horse-drawn cart, particularly the haulage of heavy loads such as coal. A carter is a person whose occupation is driving or managing a horse-drawn cart for heavy haulage, often walking beside the horses. The surname "Carter" derives from the occupation. A cartwright is a builder of carts.

The word cart is often used incorrectly to indicate four-wheeled horse-drawn vehicles. Over time, the word "cart" has expanded to mean nearly any small conveyance without regard to number of wheels, load carried, or means of propulsion. The word car has often been modified to cart through colloquialization. For example, several small sport and hobby cars carry "cart" in their name such as pedal carts (manually pedaled), soap-box carts (gravity run), and go-carts (gas engine). Similarly, golf cars are more commonly known as golf carts.

== History ==
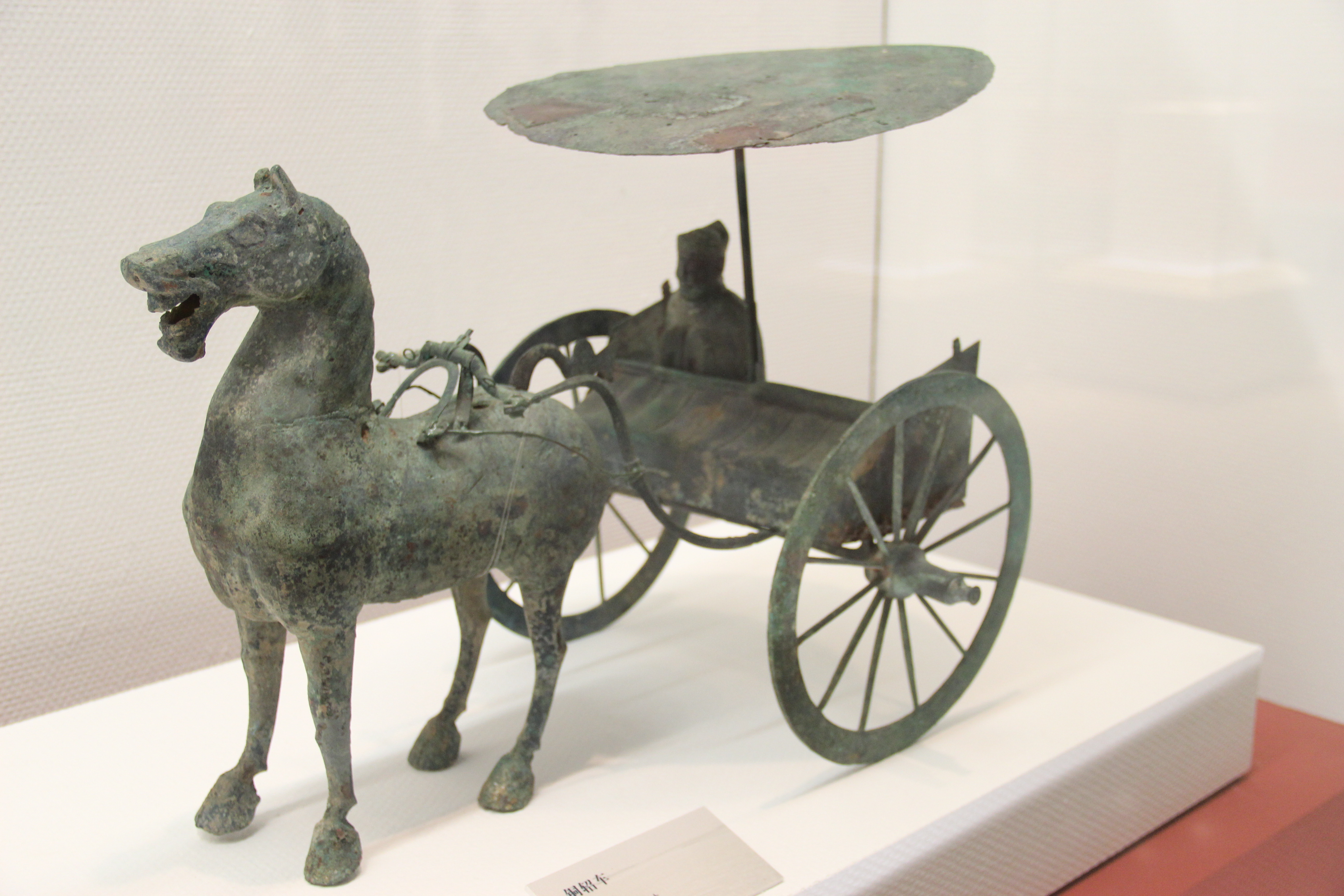
Han dynasty bronze figures, 1st or 2nd century AD

The history of the cart is closely tied to the invention of the wheel. Pre-dating the wheel there were dragged devices like sledges and travois. The earliest known wheels date back to around 3400 to 3000 BC. The combination of the wheel and axle enabled the development of early wheeled vehicles which transformed human mobility and trade. The earliest wheeled vehicles had four-wheels (wagons), however two-wheeled vehicles (carts) required about 40% less pulling force than a four-wheeled vehicle of the same weight and were more maneuverable.

With the domestication of animals such as oxen and horses, carts became central to ancient economies. Animal‑drawn carts and wagons were widely used across civilizations for farming, trade, and migration. Their evolution—from solid wooden wheels to lighter spoked designs—marked a major technological advance, improving efficiency and enabling long‑distance transport.

== Human-powered carts ==
=== Large carts ===
- Rickshaw: Used to transport passengers
- Pushcart: a street vendor's or costermonger's cart which carries goods for sale and is manually pushed into position near streets or marketplaces.
- Food cart: a mobile kitchen set up on the street to prepare and sell food to passers-by
- Mormon handcarts: A large cart used in the mid-1800s by westward-emigrating Mormons to carry their belongings
Large human-powered carts

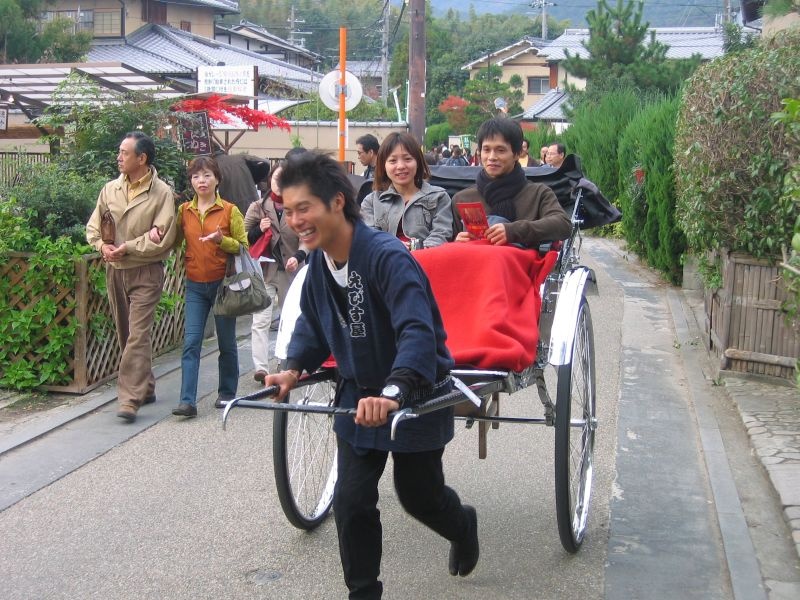
Rickshaw

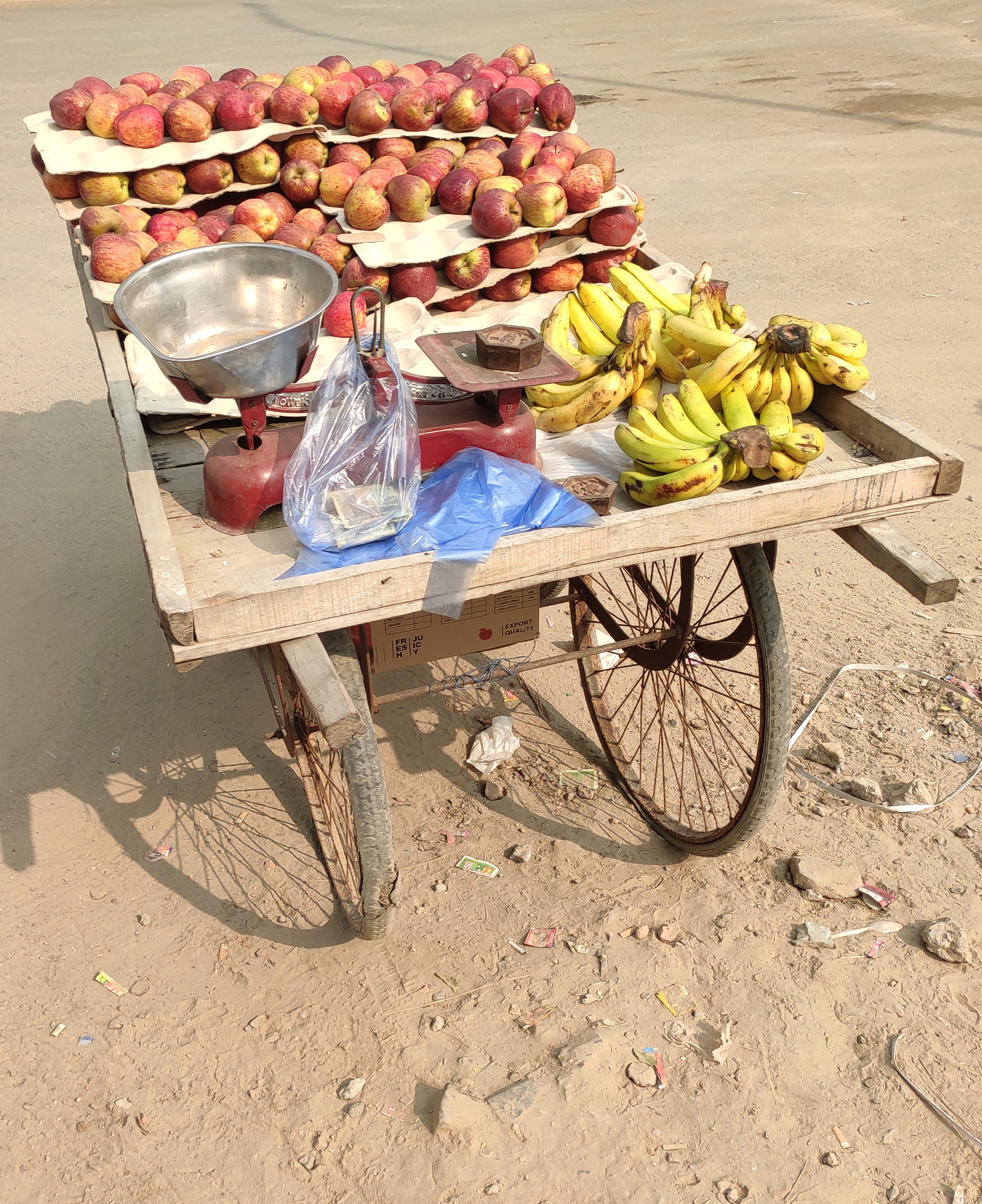
Street vendor pushcart

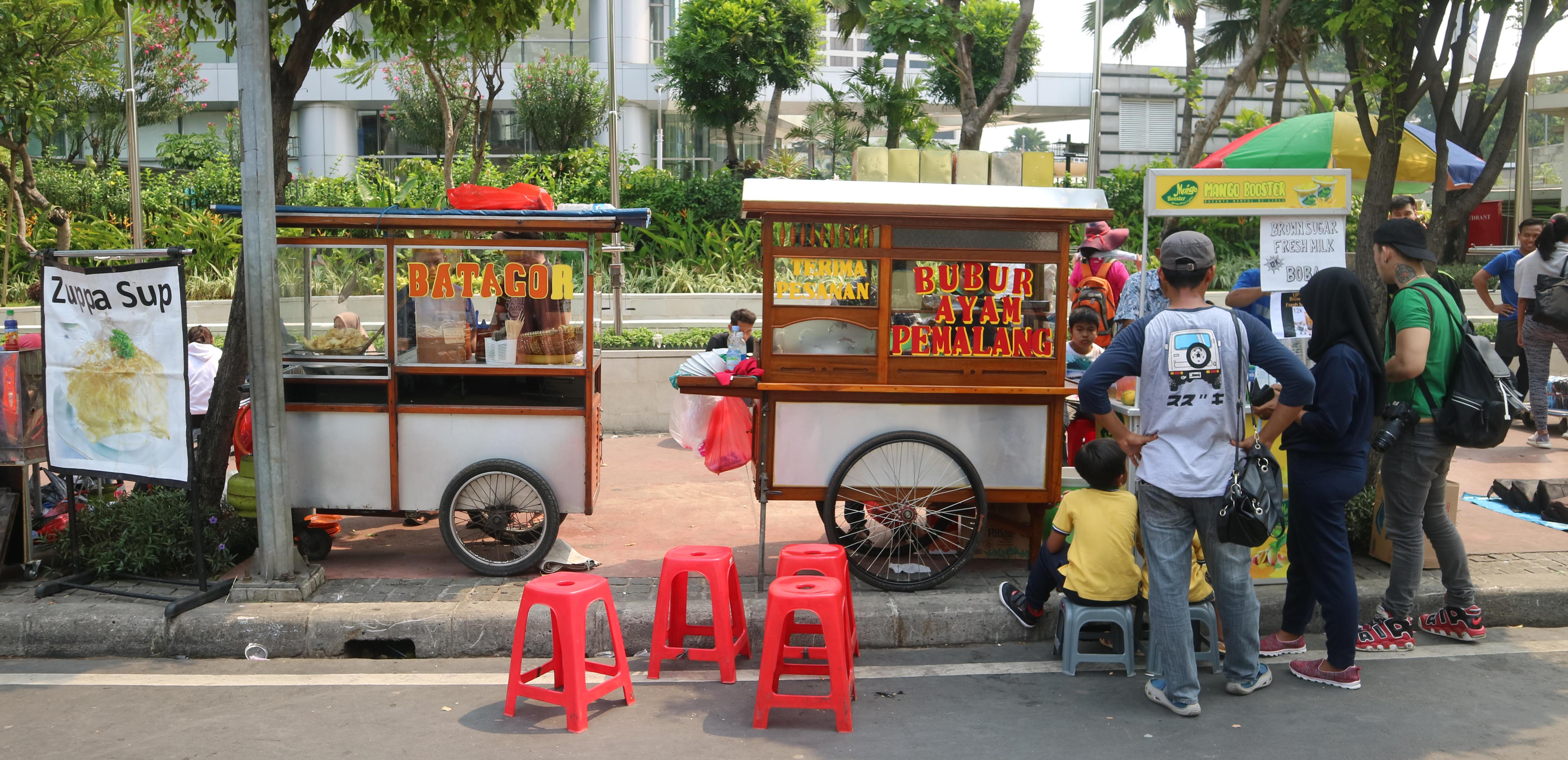
Modern food carts

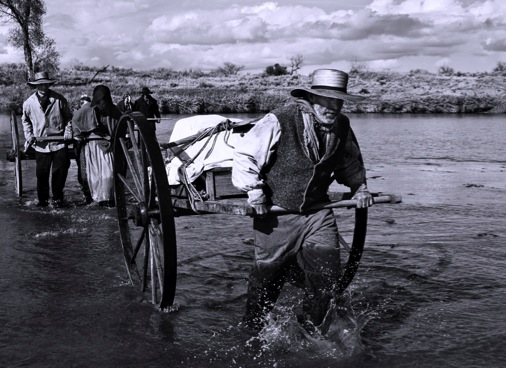
Mormon handcart

=== Small carts ===
Small human pushed or pulled conveyances commonly called carts can have any number of wheels (not limited to two). The term handcart can mean any of numerous small conveyances.

- Hand truck: A two-wheeled upright handcart for moving boxes, sacks, large appliances and other loads
- Baggage cart: for travelers to carry luggage in places like airports and train stations
- Shopping cart: a wheeled basket supplied by a store for use by customers inside the premises as they move around selecting items prior to paying for those goods
- Serving cart: for transporting prepared food for serving to customers such as in a restaurant or airplanes; may be named for what it carries, such as tea cart for tea service, or pastry cart for offering desserts at a restaurant
Small human-powered carts

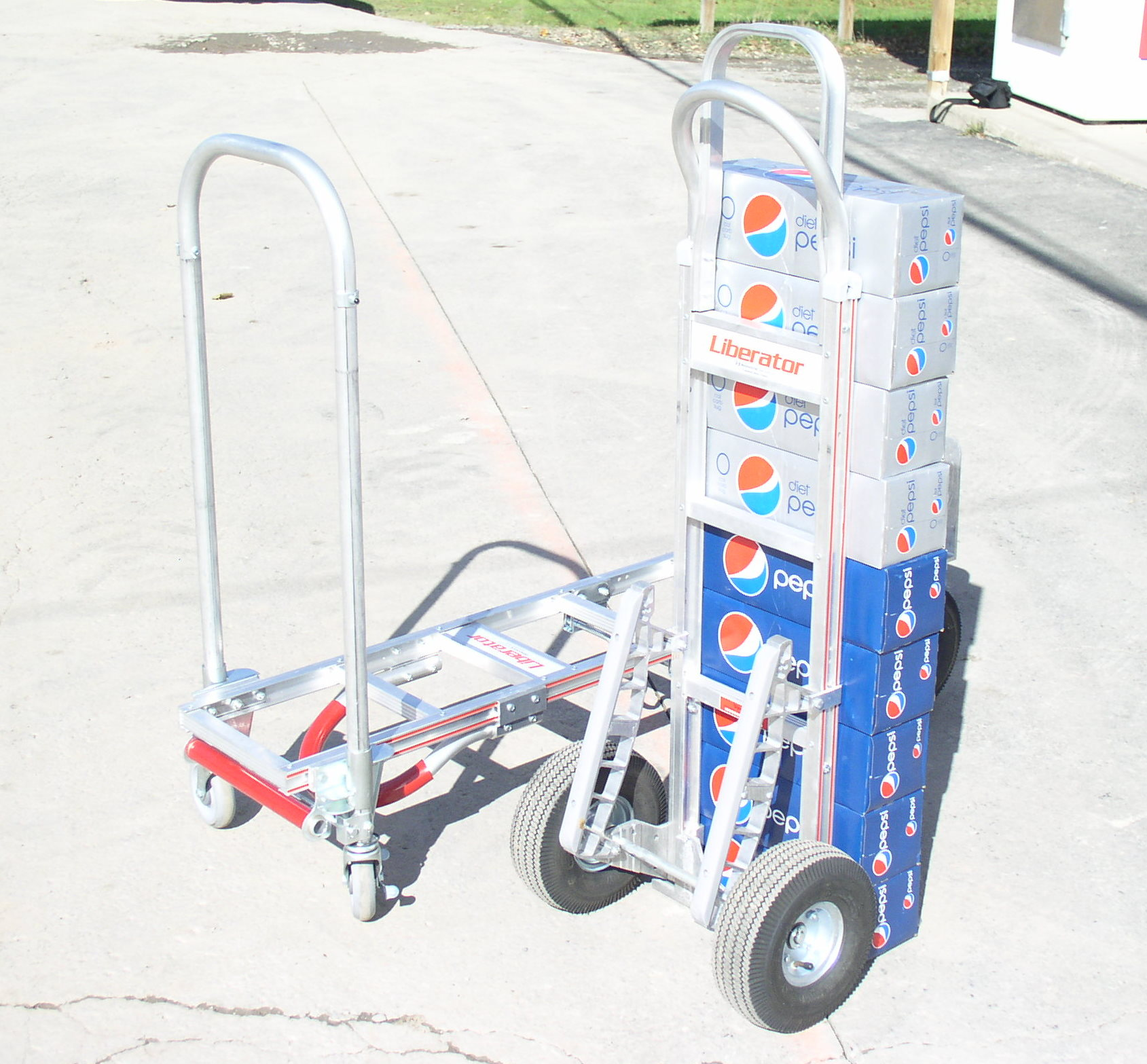
Hand trucks

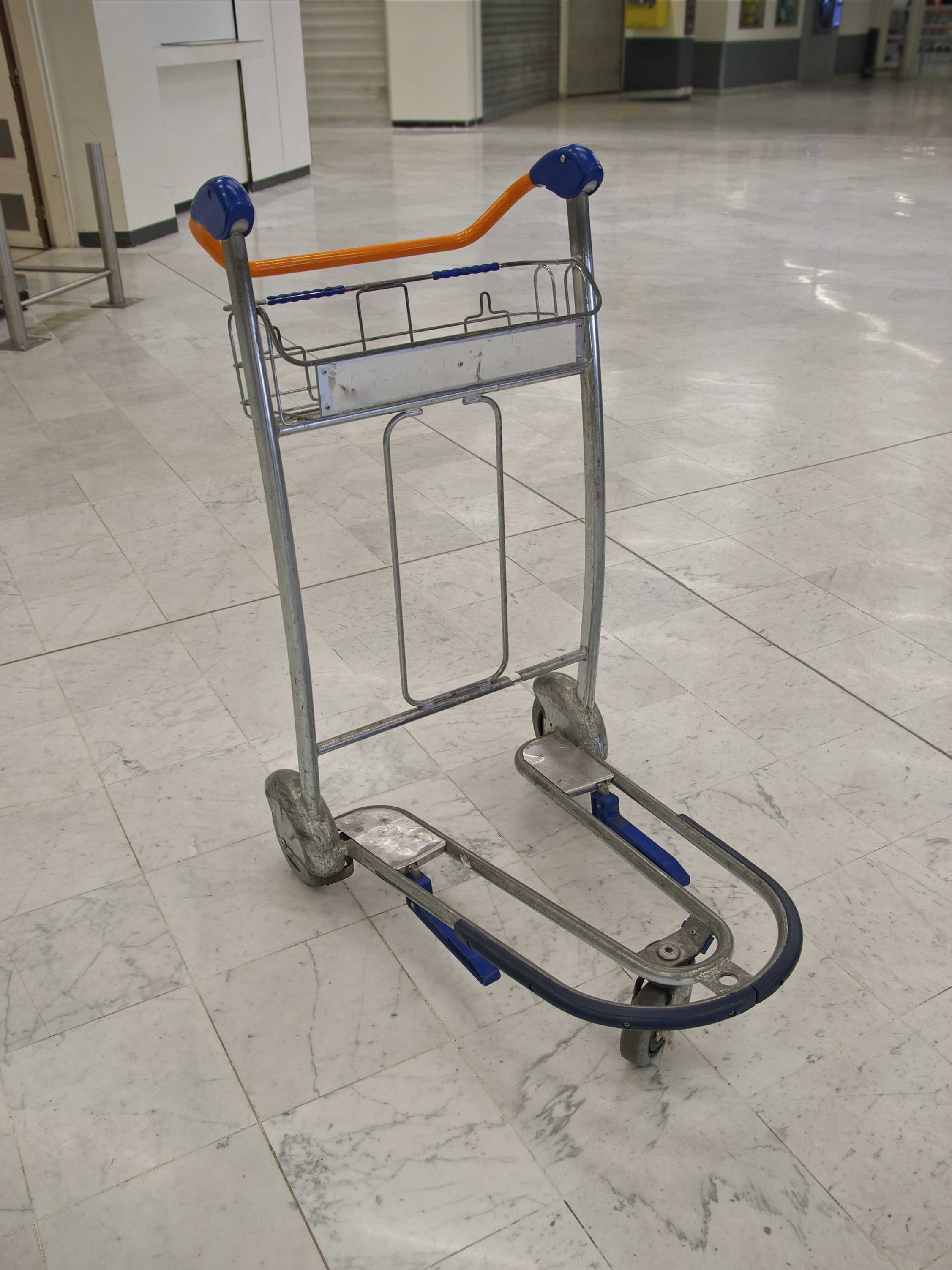
Airport baggage cart

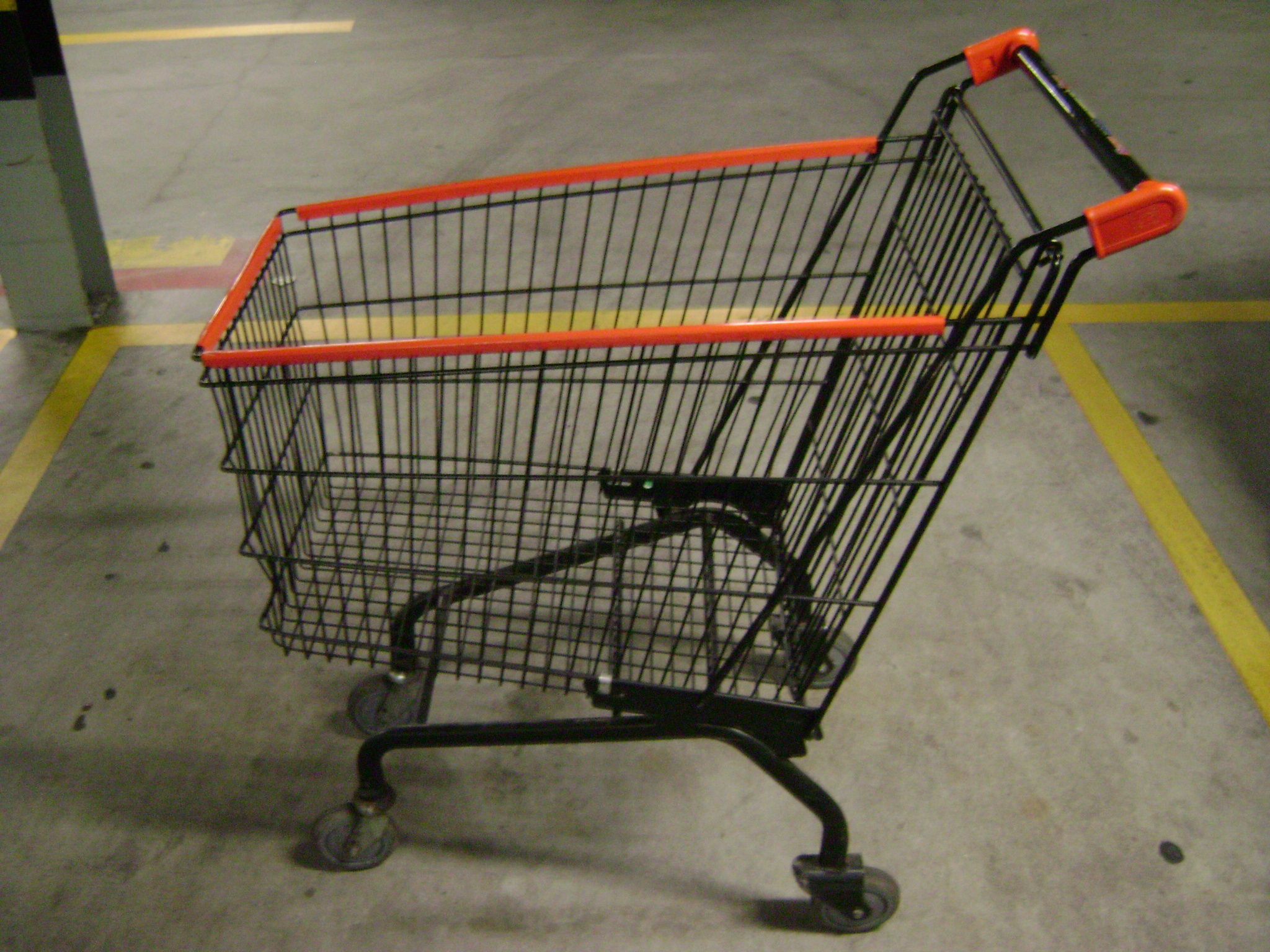
Shopping cart

== Animal-powered carts ==
Carts may be drawn by animals, such as horses, donkeys, and oxen. They have been in continuous use since the invention of the wheel. Carts may be named for the animal that pulls them, such as horsecart, donkey cart, oxcart or dog cart (not to be confused with dogcart which is a horse-drawn vehicle that carried dogs).

Carts have many different shapes, based on what is being transported and the shape of the draught animal. When being pulled by a single animal, carts have a pair of shafts that support and balance the cart, and the weight of the shafts on the animal is carried by a padded harness saddle. When a cart is being pulled by a pair of animals, it has a single pole between the pair. Draught traces attach to the vehicle on one end, and to a collar, yoke, or other parts of the harness. Traces are made from leather, chain, rope, or other materials.

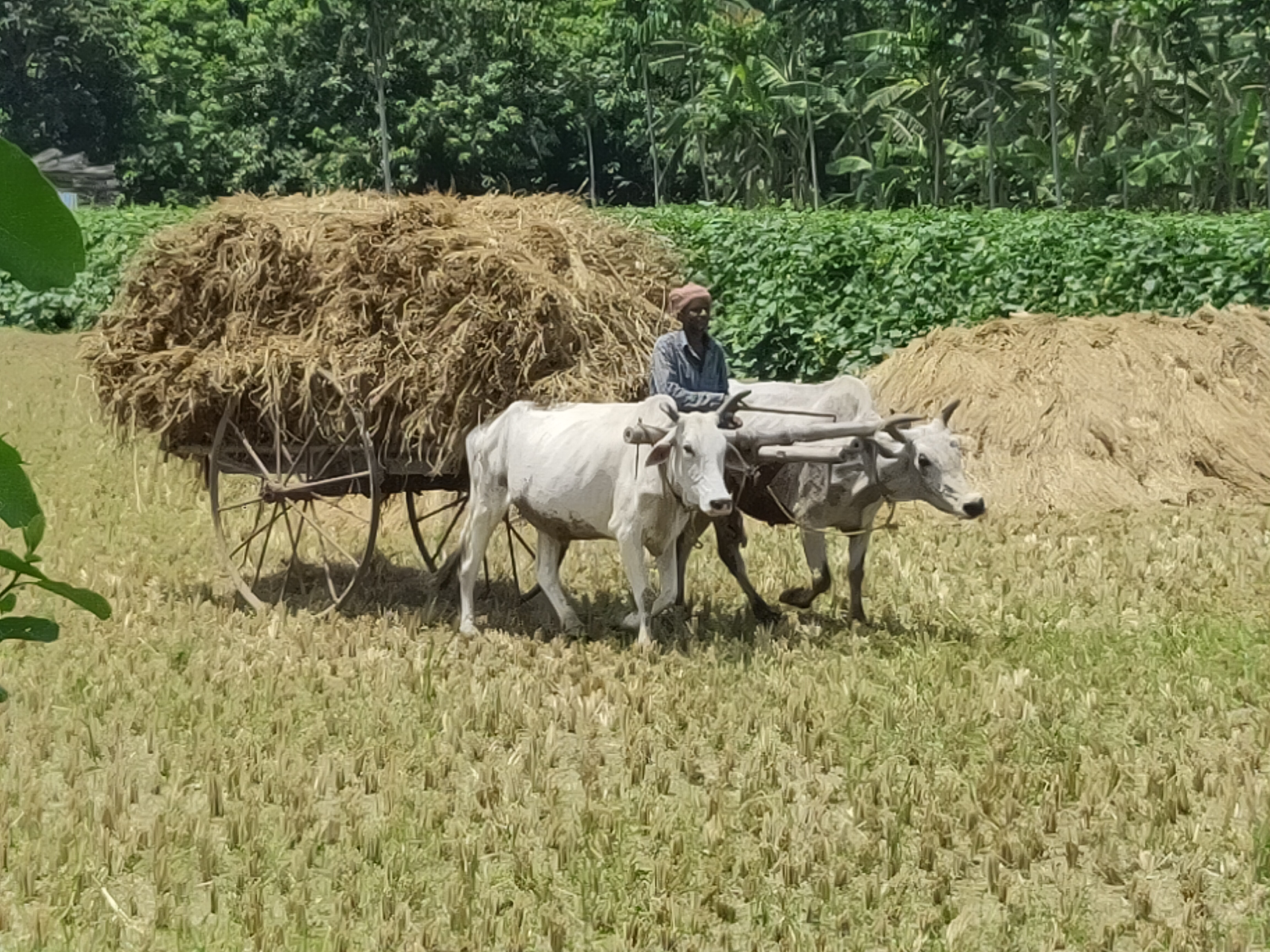
Oxcart

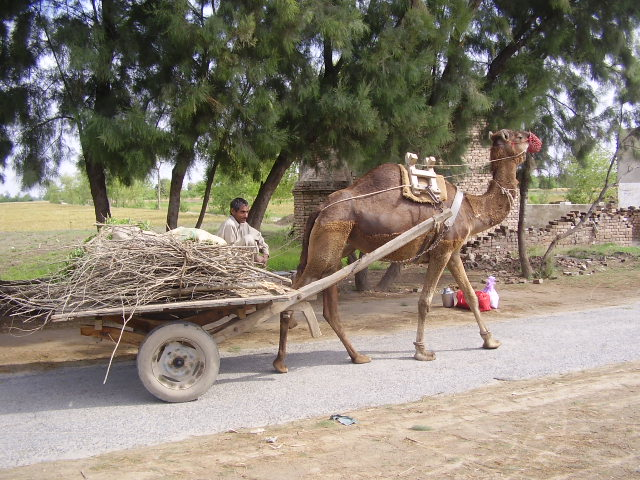
Camel cart

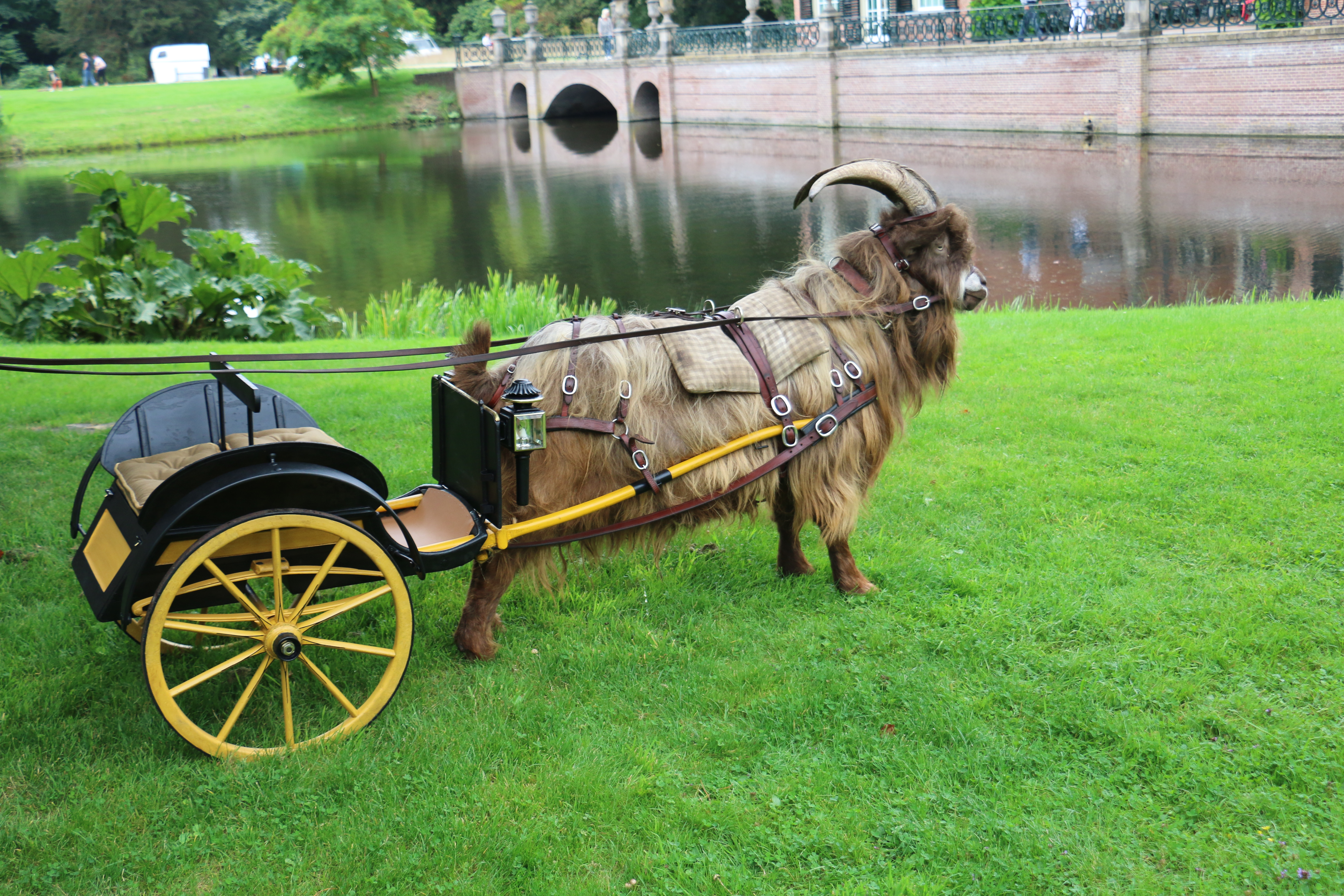
Goat cart

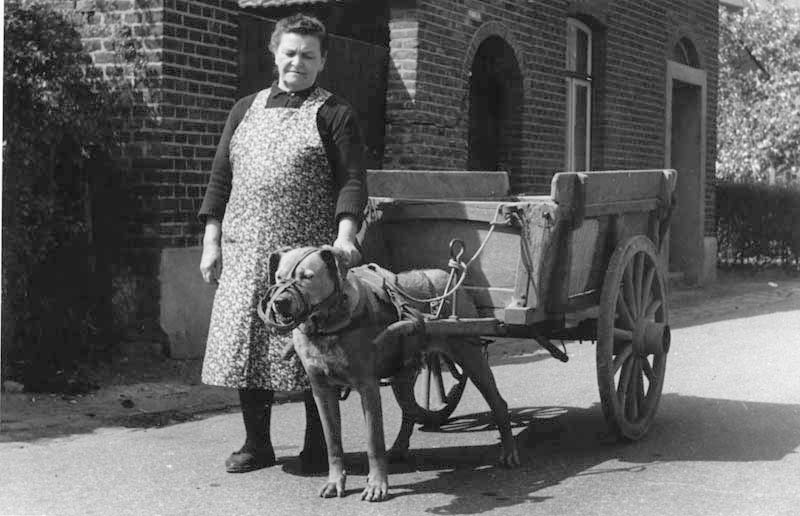
Dog cart

=== Horse-drawn carts ===
The term "cart" is a category of horse-drawn vehicles which have two wheels. However as slang it has been used to mean any horse-drawn vehicle including those with four wheels—though mainly used to indicate farm wagons and commercial wagons which have corresponding two-wheeled equivalents or forerunners. The horsecart category includes carts whether pulled by horses, ponies, donkeys, or mules, because the methods of harnessing is the same for all equids. Carts can be divided into freight-carrying carts and passenger carts, with the nicer passenger carts also named cars.

For examples, see lists at:

- Horse-drawn vehicle § Two‑wheeled passenger vehicles
- Horse-drawn vehicle § Two‑wheeled load carrying vehicles
Horse-drawn carts

Milk cart

Shell collector's cart

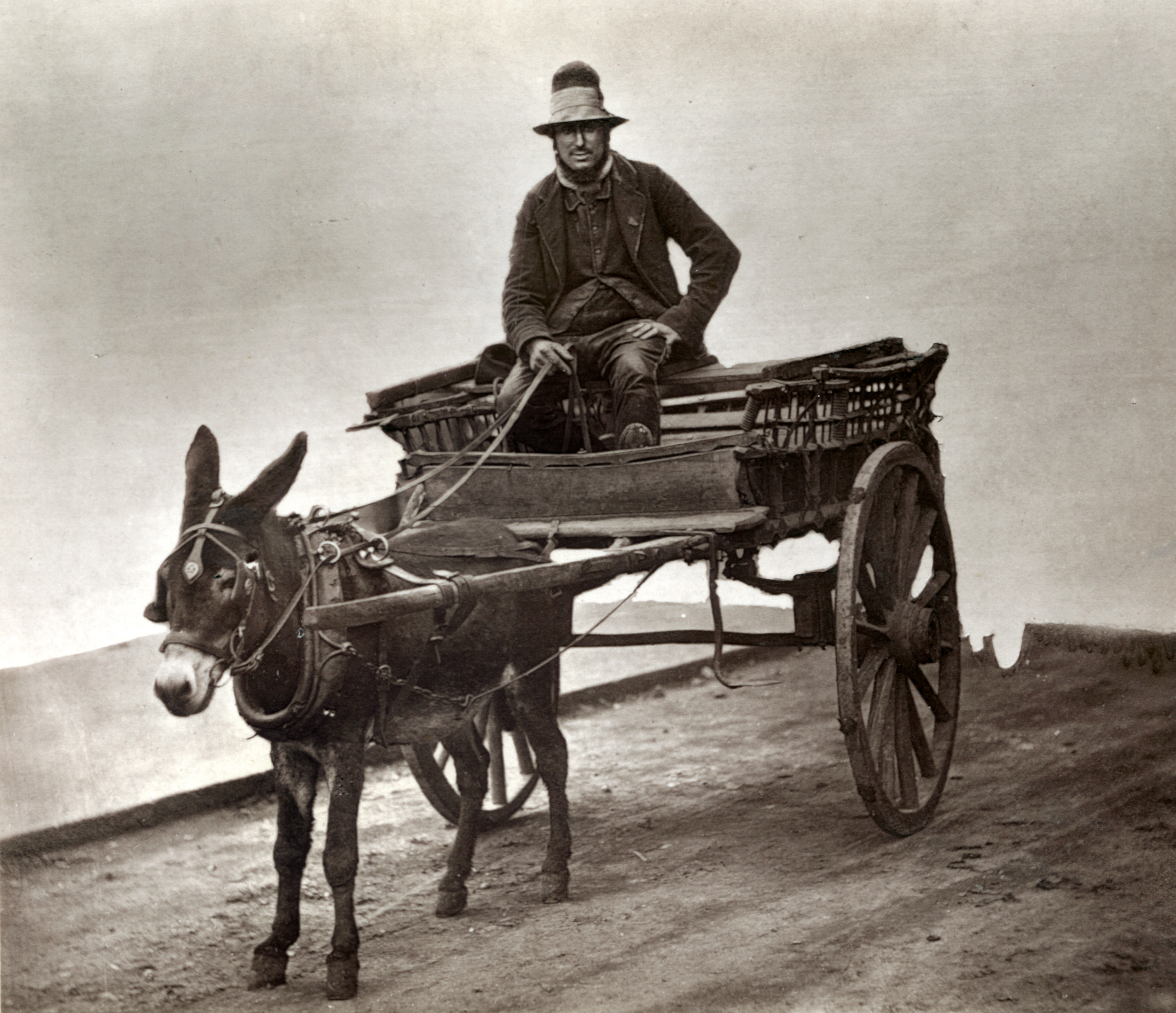
Donkey cart

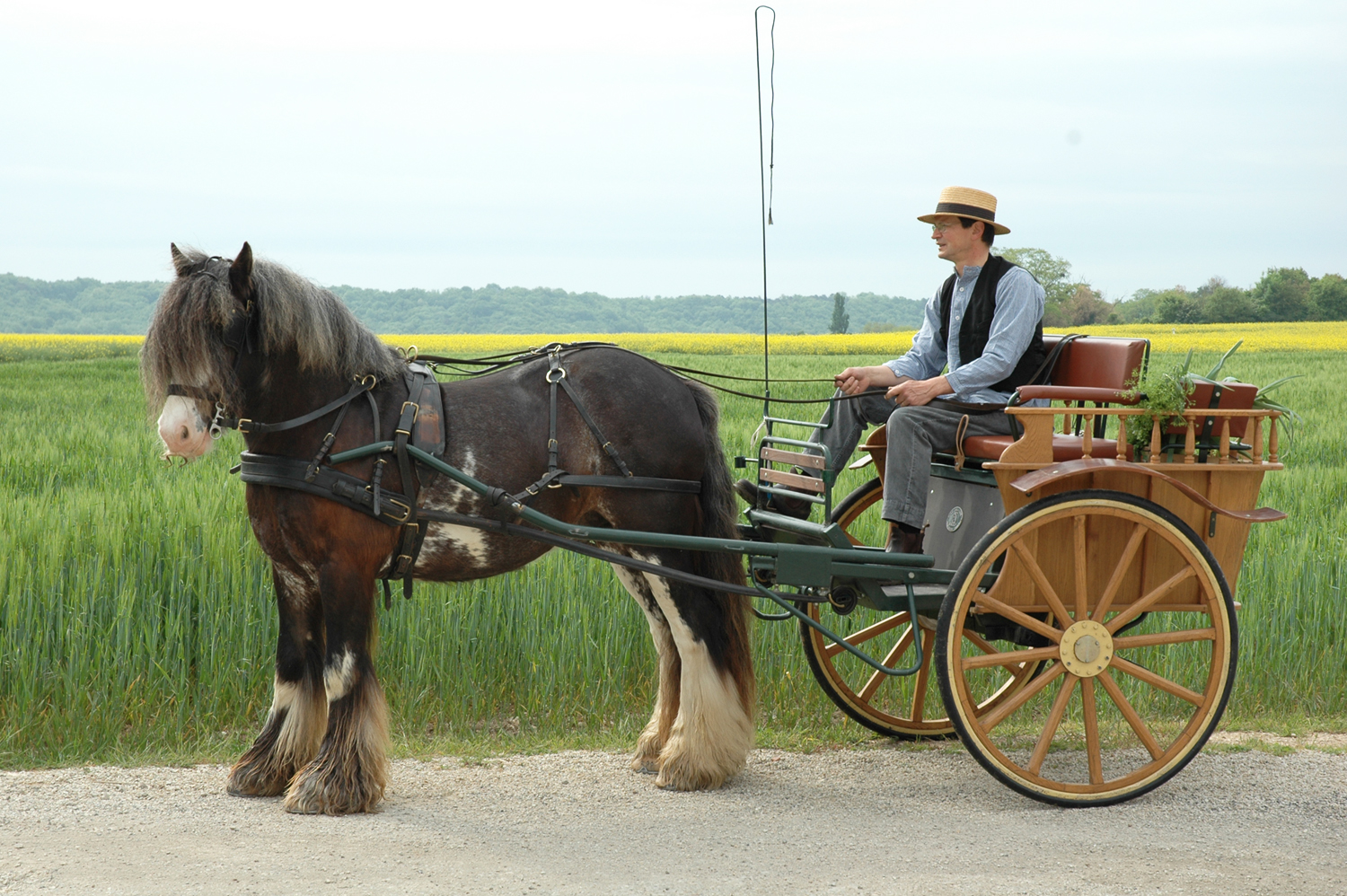
Modern passenger cart

== Other historical carts ==
- Dead cart: A cart used historically for transporting corpses during epidemics, plague outbreaks, or battlefield cleanup. Typically a simple utility cart adapted for the purpose, and could be horse-drawn or human-powered.
- Night-soil cart or night-cart: A cart used for collecting and transporting night soil (human waste) before the availability of modern sewer systems; typically a simple utility cart drawn by a horse or pushed by sanitation workers at night.
- Rag-and-bone cart: A cart used by itinerant collectors (rag-and-bone man) who gathered rags, bones, scrap metal, and other reusable materials in the 18th to 20th centuries; often hand-pushed or drawn by a small horse or donkey.

== See also ==
- Misraħ Għar il-Kbir — Collection of prehistoric cart ruts in Malta
- Sling cart – Type of cart for heavy objects

Images

- Media related to Carts at Wikimedia Commons
- Media related to Hand carts at Wikimedia Commons
- Media related to Pushcarts at Wikimedia Commons
- Media related to Animal-powered carts at Wikimedia Commons
- Media related to Horse-drawn carts at Wikimedia Commons
