= Torulene dioxygenase =

Identifiers
- EC no.: 1.13.11.59

Databases
- IntEnz: IntEnz view
- BRENDA: BRENDA entry
- ExPASy: NiceZyme view
- KEGG: KEGG entry
- MetaCyc: metabolic pathway
- PRIAM: profile
- PDB structures: RCSB PDB PDBe PDBsum
Search
- PMC: articles
- PubMed: articles
- NCBI: proteins

Torulene dioxygenase (EC 1.13.11.59, CAO-2, CarT) is an enzyme with systematic name torulene:oxygen oxidoreductase. This enzyme catalyses the following chemical reaction

torulene + O_{2} $\rightleftharpoons$ 4'-apo-beta, psi-caroten-4'-al + 3-methylbut-2-enal

It is assumed that 3-methylbut-2-enal is formed.
