= CARTE Museum =

Cartographic Acquisition Research Teaching and Exhibition Museum (CARTE)
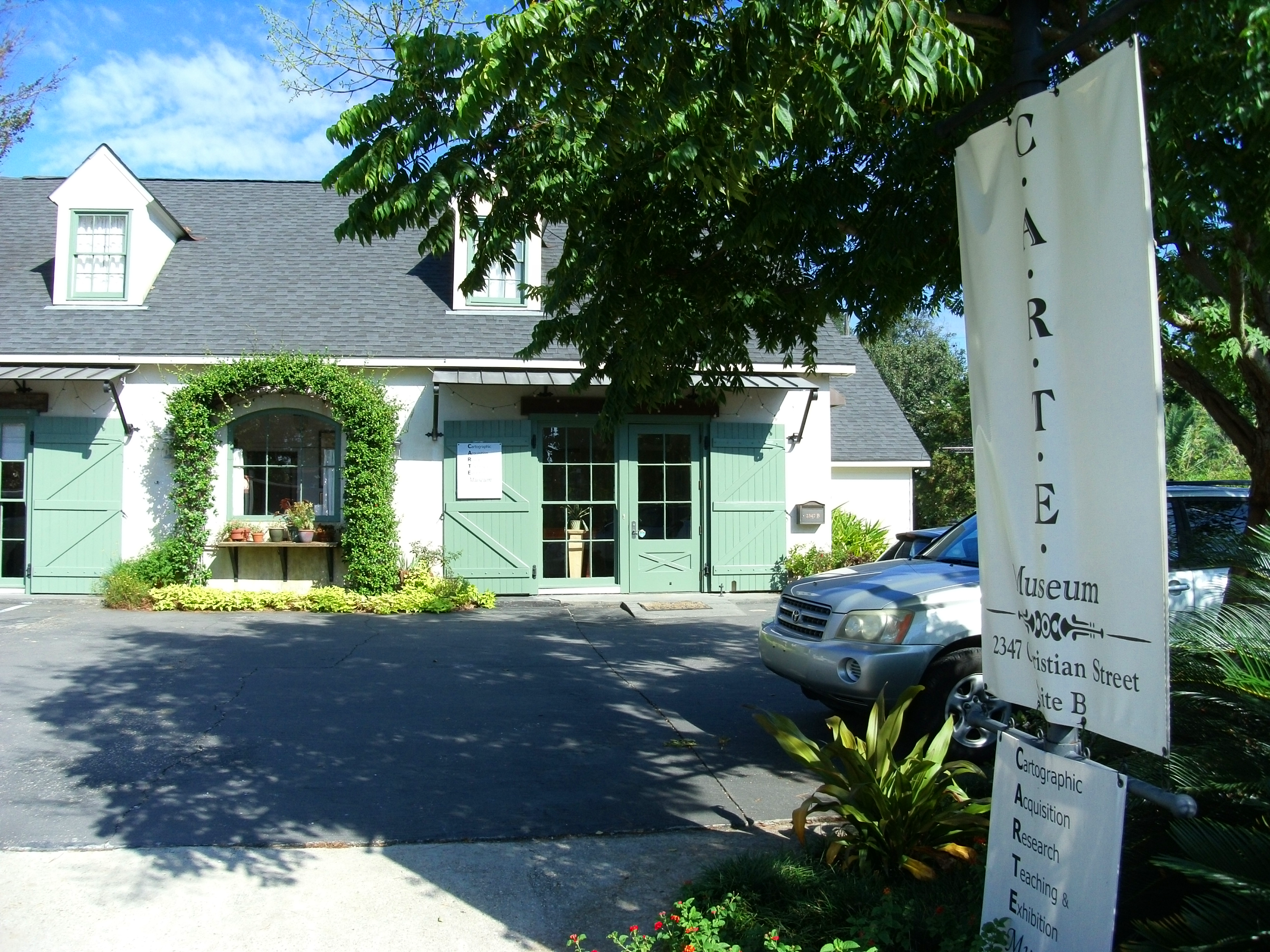

- Location of the CARTE Museum in Louisiana
- Established: 2009
- Dissolved: 2017
- Location: Baton Rouge, Louisiana
- Coordinates: 30.425961°N 91.158632°W
- Type: History museum
- Collection size: 10,000 (2,300 individual maps and atlas entries)
- Director: David J. Morgan
- Website: cartemuseum.org

The Cartographic Acquisition Research Teaching and Exhibition Museum (CARTE – the French word for map) was a small privately owned cartographic museum located in Baton Rouge, Louisiana, dedicated to the preservation of original maps and atlases. The collection documented early North American continent exploration, centered on the present-day Louisiana Gulf Coast from the 1500s up to the appearance of aerial cartography in the early 20th century.

Owner David Morgan closed the collection of maps to the public in 2017, citing economic downturn. The collection was disposed of by auction in blocks.

== The collection ==
The collection included maps by Guillaume de L’Isle, Louis Jolliet, Nicolas de Fer, Henri Joutel, Barthelemy Lafon, William Darby, and John La Tourrette. Most maps exhibited original hand color or color lithography and were accompanied by written explanations highlighting important changes or features on individual maps. Approximately 30 maps were on display at any given time and grouped together by common theme.

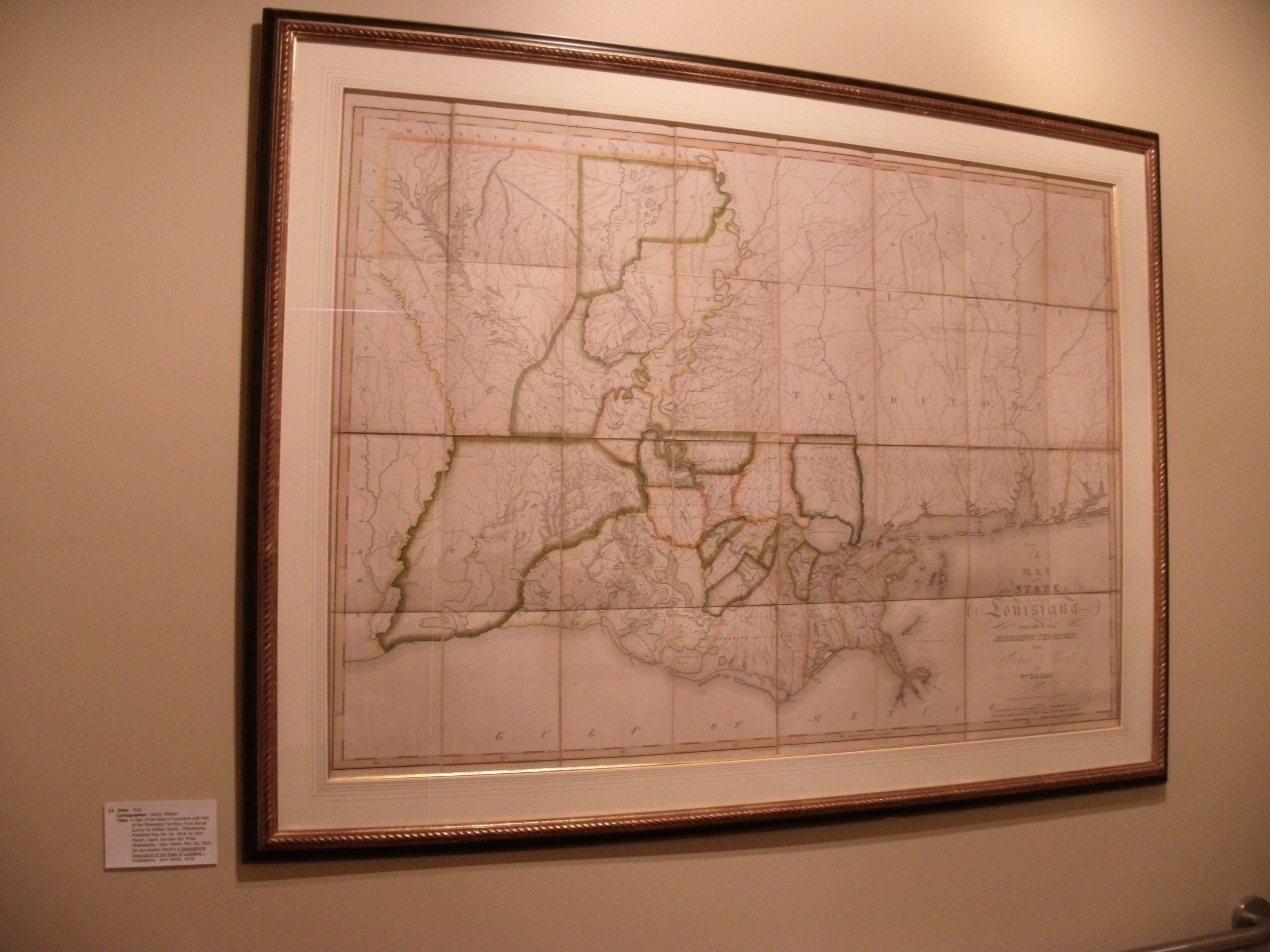
Map of the State of Louisiana With Part of the Mississippi Territory, 1816 by William Darby

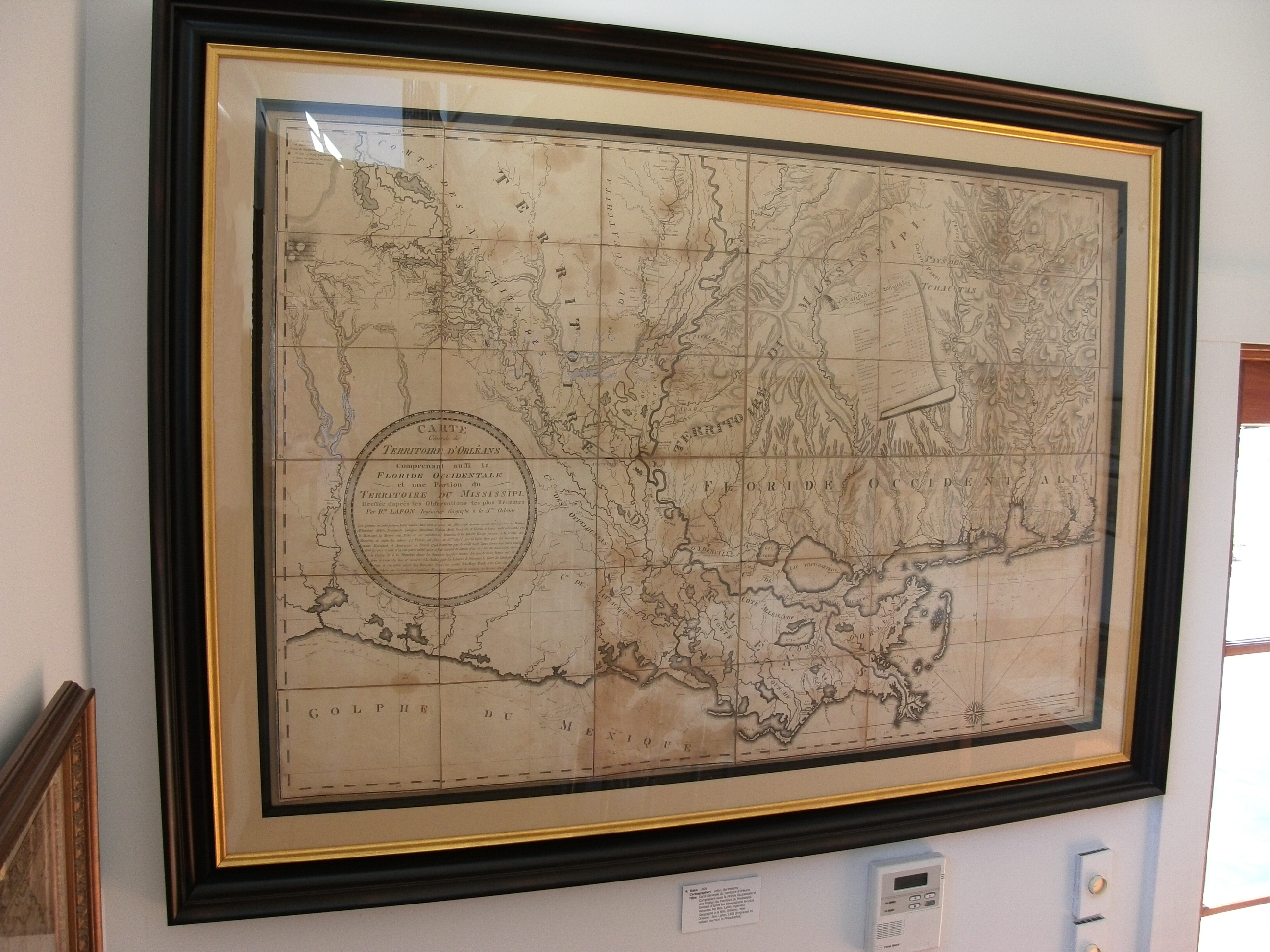
1806 Map by Barthelemy Lafon
