= Christian African Relief Trust =

Humanitarian agency

The Christian African Relief Trust (CART) is an independent humanitarian agency operated by volunteers for the specific purpose of providing individual and community development and disaster relief. The company was founded in 1982 and is currently active in Africa and India. The non profit organization is based in Huddersfield, West Yorkshire, England.

== History ==
Christian African Relief Trust was founded in 1982 by Guildford Tompkins.

== Purpose ==
CART serves people without regard to their ethnic, political, or religious association. It simply helps people in need, especially those most who are vulnerable, such as women, children, and senior citizens.

== CART facts ==
CART serves in 17 different African countries. The agency also has more than 90 percent of private donations, used for direct humanitarian services.
