= Kärt Hellerma =

Estonian journalist, writer and literary critic

Kärt Hellerma (born in Tallinn on 9 November 1956) is an Estonian journalist, writer, and literary critic. She has written children's books, novels, a travelogue, and short stories.

She graduated from University of Tartu, majoring in journalism.

Before becoming full time writer, she was a journalist.

== Selected works ==
- 2010: children's book Õrnad kõrvad ('Sensitive Ears')
- 2012: children's book Taevarändurid ja teisi jutte ('Pilgrims of the Sky and Other Stories')
