= Luis Cartés =

Uruguayan footballer (born 1998)

Personal information
- Full name: Luis Iván Cartés Maidana
- Date of birth: 28 March 1998 (age 28)
- Place of birth: Piriápolis, Uruguay
- Height: 1.79 m (5 ft 10 in)
- Position: Goalkeeper

Team information
- Current team: Durazno

Youth career
- Peñarol

Senior career*
| Years | Team | Apps | (Gls) |
| 2018–2020 | Peñarol | 0 | (0) |
| 2018–2020 | → Plaza Colonia (loan) | 1 | (0) |
| 2020–2021 | Plaza Colonia | 9 | (0) |
| 2021–2022 | Rampla Juniors | 0 | (0) |
| 2021 | → La Luz (loan) | | |
| 2022 | Central Español | 4 | (0) |
| 2023– | Durazno | | |
- * Club domestic league appearances and goals as of 30 October 2022

Luis Iván Cartés Maidana (born 28 March 1998) is a Uruguay footballer who plays as a goalkeeper for Durazno.
