= French frigate Descartes =

Historical French ship

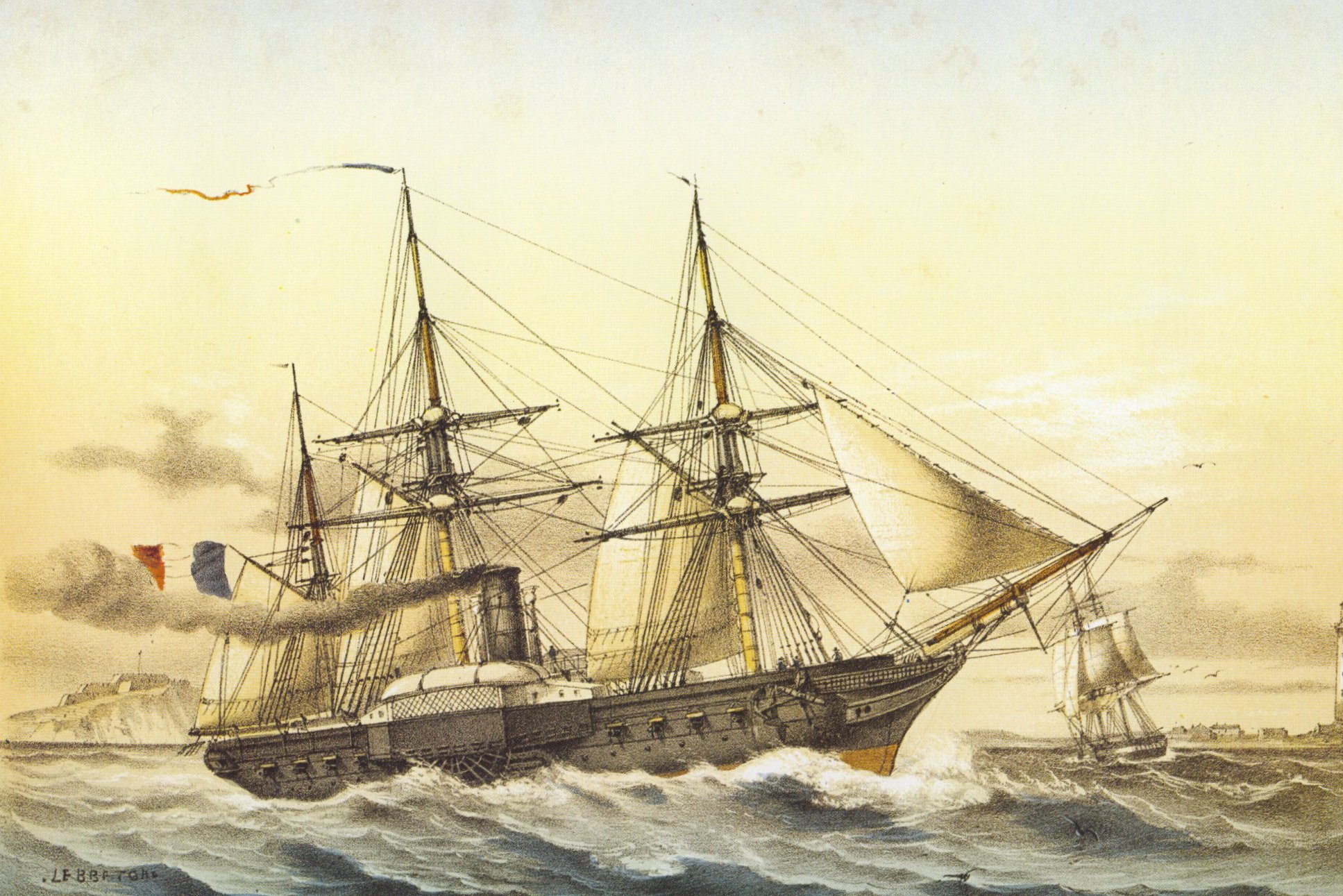

History

France
- Name: Descartes
- Namesake: René Descartes
- Laid down: 11 February 1840
- Launched: 5 March 1844
- Christened: Gomer
- Decommissioned: 15 August 1867
- Renamed: Descartes in 1841
- Fate: Broken up in 1867.

General characteristics
- Displacement: 1,800 tonnes
- Length: 70.46 m (231 ft 2 in)
- Beam: 13.40 m (44 ft 0 in)
- Draught: 6.60 m (21 ft 8 in)
- Propulsion: 1785 m² of sail; 540 shp steam engine
- Armament: 20 guns
- Armour: Timber

Descartes was a wooden-hulled paddle frigate of the French Navy. Laid down as Gomer, she was renamed Descartes in 1841 while still on the stocks.

== Characteristics ==
The 540 hp engines of Descartes were made by Fijenoord.

== Service ==
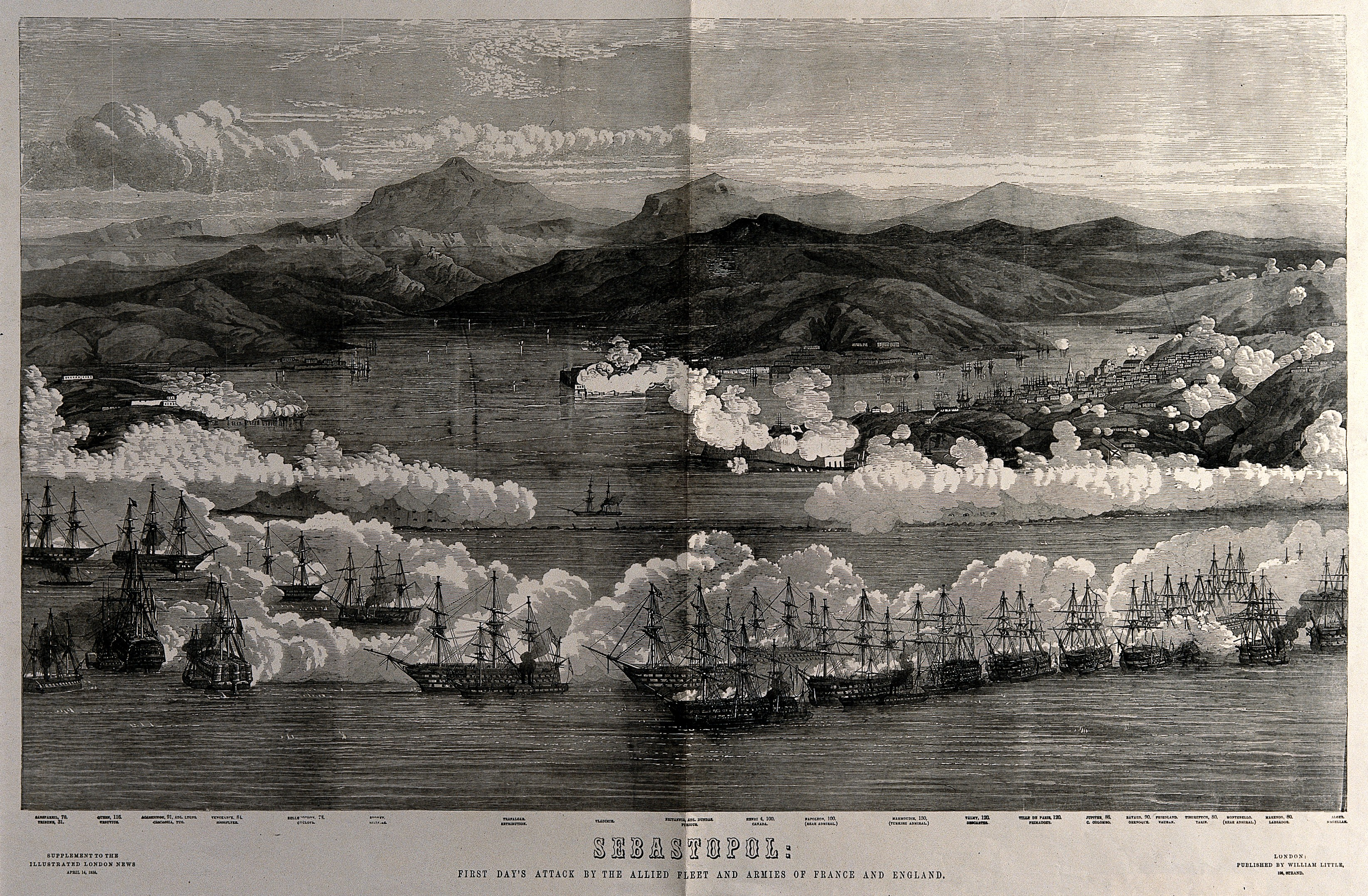
Descartes at Sebastopol, during the first day's attack by the allied fleet and armies of France and England on 17 October 1854

She took part in the Crimean War, and was used to ferry wounded from Italy.

On 17 October 1855, she took part in the Battle of Kinburn.

She was eventually broken up in Brest in July 1867.
