= Center for Advanced Research and Technology =

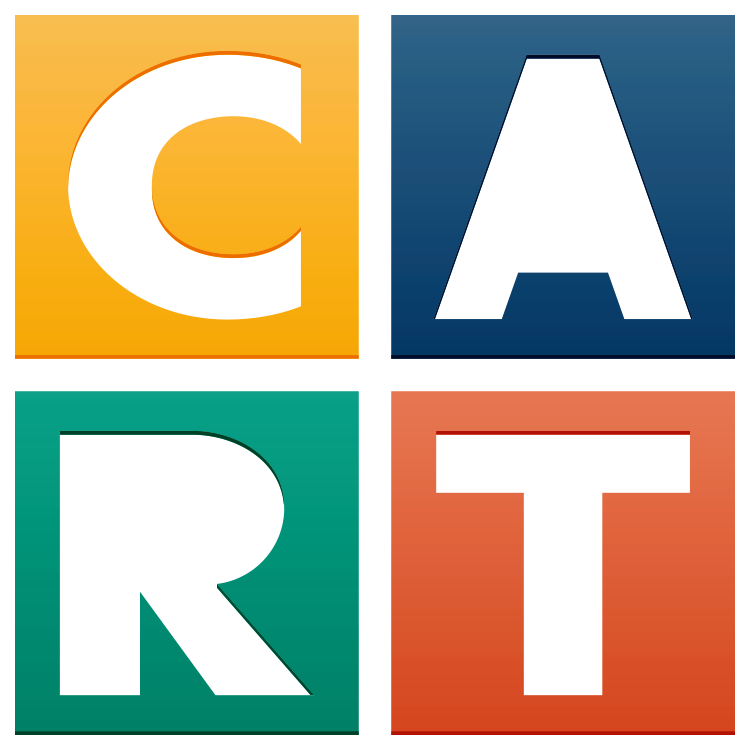

Location
- Clovis, California; United States
- Coordinates: 36.80411°N 119.69833°W

Information
- Type: Public
- Established: May 2000
- Grades: 11-12
- Enrollment: 1200
- Website: http://www.cart.org/

The Center for Advanced Research and Technology (CART) is a high tech high school in Clovis, California, United States.

The CART facility is about 75,000 sq ft (7,000 m^{2}). It offers classes in professional sciences, engineering, advanced communications, and global economics. Within each cluster are career-specific laboratories in which students complete industry-based projects and receive academic credit for advanced English, science, math, and technology.

== Approach ==
After going through an application process, eleventh- and twelfth-grade students from the Clovis and Fresno Unified School Districts are bused to CART, where they attend three-hour classes in one of the many laboratories taught by teams of instructors covering a variety of educational courses that provide real-life career insight and personal expertise-.

Unlike most local public high schools where students move from one class to another for different subjects, the CART program implements a different technique in that each lab is taught by a minimum of three teachers each teaching a branch-off subject related to the main subject. The make-up of the course differs between the lab chosen by the student. Each teacher in the lab has a specialty. Over the course the required high school education is more than covered by each teacher in a way to encompass the main topic of the lab with the same lesson.

== Courses ==
In addition to teaching the material from courses offered at other traditional high schools, CART offers education and experience in forensic research, biomedicine, environmental science, cybersecurity, psychology, law and policy, game design, multimedia, robotics, biotechnology, business and finance, marketing and advertising, hospitality and event management.

== History ==
Completed in May 2000, students began classes in August 2000. Purchase of the grounds for the new school was done in January 1997. Purchased property price to date is $1,894,867, the developer granted CART 5% interest in their project.
