= Kärt =

- Gender: Female
- Language: Estonian
- Name day: 17 March

Origin
- Region of origin: Estonia

Kärt is an Estonian feminine given name and may refer to:

- Kärt Hellerma (born 1956), Estonian journalist, writer, and literary critic
- Kärt Jänes-Kapp (1960–2015), Estonian journalist and editor
- Kärt Kross-Merilo (born 1968), Estonian actress
- Kärt Siilats (born 1980), Estonian high jumper
- Kärt Tammjärv (born 1991), Estonian actress
- Kärt Tomingas (1967–2025), Estonian actress, singer, lecturer, and pedagogue
