= D'Oyly baronets =

Baronets in the United Kingdom

Three baronetcies were created for persons with the surname D'Oyly, two in the Baronetage of England and one in the Baronetage of the United Kingdom. One creation is extant as of 2008.

The D'Oyly Baronetcy, of Shottisham in the County of Norfolk, was created in the Baronetage of England on 29 July 1663 for William D'Oyly, a supporter of the Royalist cause in the Civil War and Member of Parliament for Great Yarmouth and Norfolk. The D'Oyly family was descended from Robert d'Ouilly, who came over to England with William the Conqueror. An ancestor of the first Baronet, Sir Henry D'Oyly (died 1564), was Sheriff of Suffolk. The second Baronet was a Teller of the Exchequer. The sixth Baronet was Member of Parliament for Ipswich. The seventh Baronet was an administrator in India and amateur artist. The ninth Baronet was a Major-General in the Bengal Army and served in the Indian Rebellion of 1857. Warren Hastings D'Oyly, third son of the tenth baronet, was a vice-admiral in the Royal Navy.

The D'Oyly Baronetcy, of Chislehampton in the County of Oxford, was created in the Baronetage of England on 7 June 1666 for John D'Oyly, Member of Parliament for Woodstock. The title became extinct on the death of the fourth Baronet in 1773.

The D'Oyly Baronetcy, of Kandy in Ceylon, was created in the Baronetage of the United Kingdom on 29 August 1821 for the colonial administrator John D'Oyly. The title became extinct on his death in 1824.

== D'Oyly baronets, of Shottisham (1663) ==
D'Oyly baronets
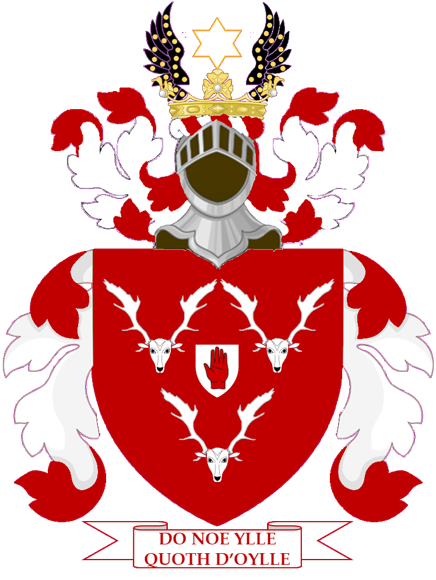
- Crest: Out of a ducal coronet Or two wings erect Sable bezantée between which and resting on the strawberry leaf of the coronet an estoile of six points Argent.
- Shield: Gules three bucks' heads cabossed Argent.
- Motto: Do Noe Ylle Quoth D'Oylle (Do No Ill, Quoth Doyle)

- Sir William D'Oyly, 1st Baronet (c. 1614–1677). He was the son of William D'Oyly and Elizabeth Stokes, daughter of Rev. Richard Stokes, Archdeacon of Norwich. He inherited the family estates at Shottisham in 1648 on the death of a great uncle and was knighted in 1641. He was MP for Norfolk and for Yarmouth. He rebuilt Blackford Hall, Norfolk, and married c. 1637 to Margaret Randall.
- Sir William D'Oyly, 2nd Baronet (c. 1637 – c. 1680), his eldest son. He was knighted in 1664 and was a Teller of the Exchequer from 1666 to 1677. He married Mary Hadley, daughter of John Hadley of Southgate, a citizen of London.
- Sir Edmund D'Oyly, 3rd Baronet (c. 1666–1700), his eldest son. He married in 1684 Dorothy Bedingfield, daughter of Philip Bedingfield of Ditchingham.
- Sir Edmund D'Oyly, 4th Baronet (died 1763), his eldest son. He sold the estate at Shottisham and died unmarried.
- The Reverend Sir Hadley D'Oyly, 5th Baronet (c. 1709–1764), his cousin, being eldest surviving son of Hadley D'Oyly, second son of the second Baronet. Rector of Wotton and Felixstow, Suffolk. Educated Queen's College, Oxford (BA, 1726). He married by 1753 Henrietta Maynard, daughter of Rev. Henry Osborne, Vicar of Thaxted, Essex.
- Sir John Hadley D'Oyly, 6th Baronet (1754–1818), his eldest son. Collector of Customs at Calcutta, Member of Parliament for Ipswich. He married Diana Cotes, widow of William Cotes and daughter of William Rochfort.
- Sir Charles D'Oyly, 7th Baronet (1781–1845), his eldest son. Served in the Civil Service of the East India Company and on the Board of Customs at Calcutta. Married twice; firstly to Marian Greer, daughter of William Greer; secondly to Elizabeth Jane Ross, daughter of Major Thomas Ross.
- Sir John Hadley D'Oyly, 8th Baronet (1794–1869), his brother. Long-serving member of the East India Company and held many posts in India, including Official Magistrate at Midnapore and Civil and Session Judge at Beerboom. He married twice; firstly to Charlotte Thompson, daughter of George Nesbitt Thompson; secondly to Mary Fendall, daughter of John Fendall, Member of the Supreme Council at Calcutta.
- Major-General Sir Charles Walters D'Oyly, 9th Baronet (1822–1900), his eldest son. Entered the Bengal Army and served as Aide-de-Camp to the Governor-General from 1851 to 1856; he served in the Gwalior Campaign and the Indian Rebellion of 1857 before retiring in 1875. He married twice; firstly to Emily Jane Nott, daughter of Major-General George Nott; secondly to Elinor Scott, daughter of James Winter Scott.
- Sir Warren Hastings D'Oyly, 10th Baronet (1838–1921), his half-brother. He was in the Bengal Civil Service and married twice; firstly to Henrietta Halliday, daughter of Sir Frederick James Halliday, Lieutenant-Governor of Bengal; secondly to Amy Agnes Cotton, widow of Sir George Cotton and daughter of James George White.
- Captain Sir Hastings Hadley D'Oyly, 11th Baronet (1864–1948), his eldest son. He was Deputy Commissioner at Andaman and Nicobar Islands and served in the Royal Defence Corps. He married twice; firstly to Beatrice Alice Clerk, daughter of Francis Bingham Clerk; secondly to Evelyn Maude Miller, daughter of George Taverner Miller.
- Sir Charles Hastings D'Oyly, 12th Baronet (1898–1962), his eldest son.
- Sir John Rochfort D'Oyly, 13th Baronet (1900–1986), his brother.
- Sir Nigel Hadley Miller D'Oyly, 14th Baronet (1914–2000), his half-brother.
- Sir Hadley Gregory D'Oyly, 15th Baronet (born 1956), his eldest son.

There is no heir to the title.

== D'Oyly baronets, of Chislehampton (1666) ==
Escutcheon of the D'Oyly Baronets of Chislehampton

The D'Oyly Baronetcy, of Chislehampton in the County of Oxford, was created in the Baronetage of England on 7 June 1666 for John D'Oyly, Member of Parliament for Woodstock. The title became extinct on the death of the fourth Baronet in 1773.

No.	Image	Name and notes	Birth	Succession	Death	Refs.
1		Sir John D'Oyly, 1st Baronet	c. 1640	1666	1709	
1		Married once: in 1666 to Margaret Cholmeley (died 1704), daughter of Sir Richard Cholmeley of Grosmont, Yorkshire; issue with her: seven sons.				
1		He was the eldest son of John D'Oyly of Chiselphampton, Oxfordshire, and Wantage, Berkshire, MP for Oxfordshire, by his wife Mary Shirley, daughter of Sir John Shirley of Isfield, Sussex. Probably educated at Wadham College, Oxford (matriculating in 1657). Served as Sheriff of Oxfordshire 1684–5; commissioned in the Oxfordshire Militia; MP for Woodstock 1689–90.				
2		Sir John D'Oyly, 2nd Baronet	c. 1670	1709	1746	
2		Married twice: (1) in 1694–5 to Susanna Putt (died 1722), daughter of Sir Thomas Putt, 1st Baronet. (2) before 1727 to Rebecca Carter (died c. 1746), daughter Goddard Carter of Alverscot, Oxfordshire.				
2		Succeeded his father, being the second but eldest surviving son.				
3		Sir Thomas D'Oyly, 3rd Baronet	c. 1701	1746	1759	
3		Married once: by 1737 to Mary Wotton (died c. 1780), daughter of Samuel Wotton of Englebourne, Devon.				
3		Succeeded his father, being the third but eldest surviving son (by his first wife). He sold the Chiselhampton estate by 1748.				
4		The Reverend Sir John D'Oyly, 4th Baronet	c. 1702	1759	1773	
4		Did not marry.				
4		Succeeded his brother. He was educated at Merton College, Oxford (BA 1724) and was Rector of Cuxham, Oxfordshire, and Heston. The baronetcy became extinct upon his death.				

Cokayne notes in The Complete Baronetage that a "John D'Oyly" assumed the baronetcy and died in 1781, aged 71; at which point The Annual Register recorded that it "devolves upon Mr. D'Oyly, of Adderbury West", but Cokayne disregards this and states the relationship was not clear. Furthermore, some earlier histories of the Baronetcy suggested that William D'Oyly, the younger brother of the fourth Baronet, succeeded him, but Cokayne states that this was an "error". (Note: Burke and Burke (1838), p. 166, state that the fourth baronet was succeeded by his brother, William, who married "Miss Monk" and "with him the baronetcy is said to have become extinct, but that fact is very doubtful", while Bentham (1802), p. 404, states that William "perhaps, was brother or nephew" to the fourth baronet, without identifying him.) Cokayne states that he married a Miss Monk and had a son with her called James Monk D'Oyly. (Note: William D'Oyly and Rebecca Monk married in 1737 and had a son, James Monk D'Oyly the following year.)

== D'Oyly baronets, of Kandy (1821) ==
Escutcheon of the D'Oyly baronets of Kandy

- Sir John D'Oyly, 1st Baronet (1774–1824)
