= Sling cart =

Type of cart for heavy objects

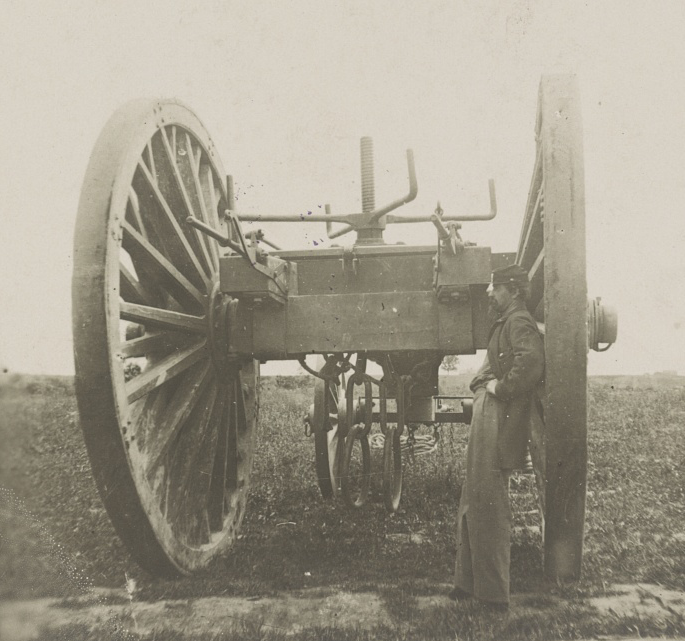
The size of this artillery sling cart used during the American Civil War may be estimated from the height of the soldier leaning against the right wheel.

A sling cart is used to transport very heavy objects over land. The cart has a skeletal frame with large-diameter wheels so the object being transported can be suspended above the ground by ropes or chains below the level of the axle. Typical sling carts have two wheels on a single axle with a long pole or tongue perpendicular to the axle for use as a lever. In the days of muzzle-loading cannon, sling carts were used to move heavy artillery from the place of manufacture or storage to a ship or fortification where the gun would be placed on a gun carriage. Specialized sling carts with two axles and four wheels were used to carry the heaviest guns. Smaller field guns were often transported on their gun carriage, but portable gun carriages were unable to withstand the recoil energy of very large guns.
