= 1784 British general election =

Election in Great Britain

- 30 March – 10 May 1784

All 558 seats in the House of Commons 280 seats needed for a majority
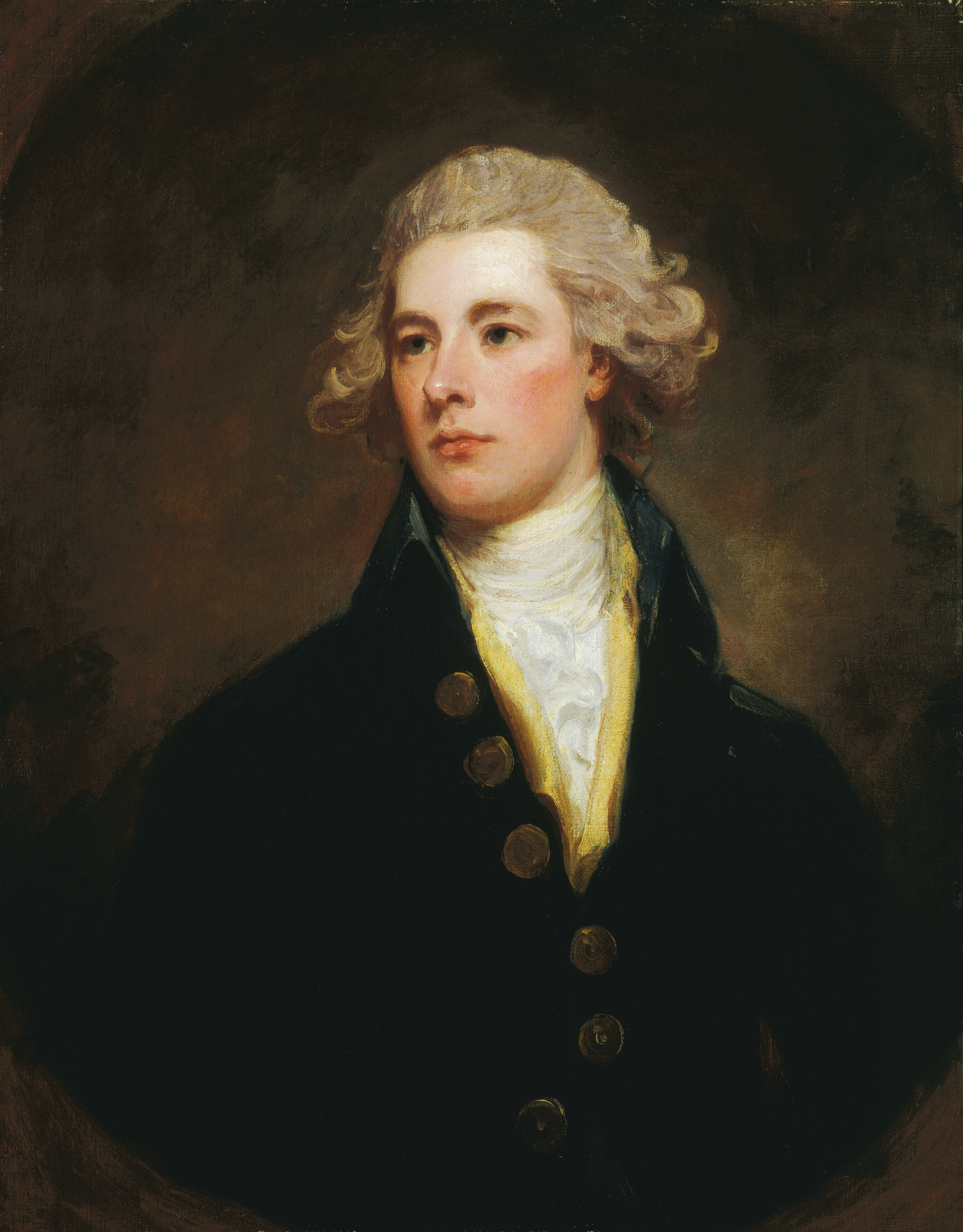

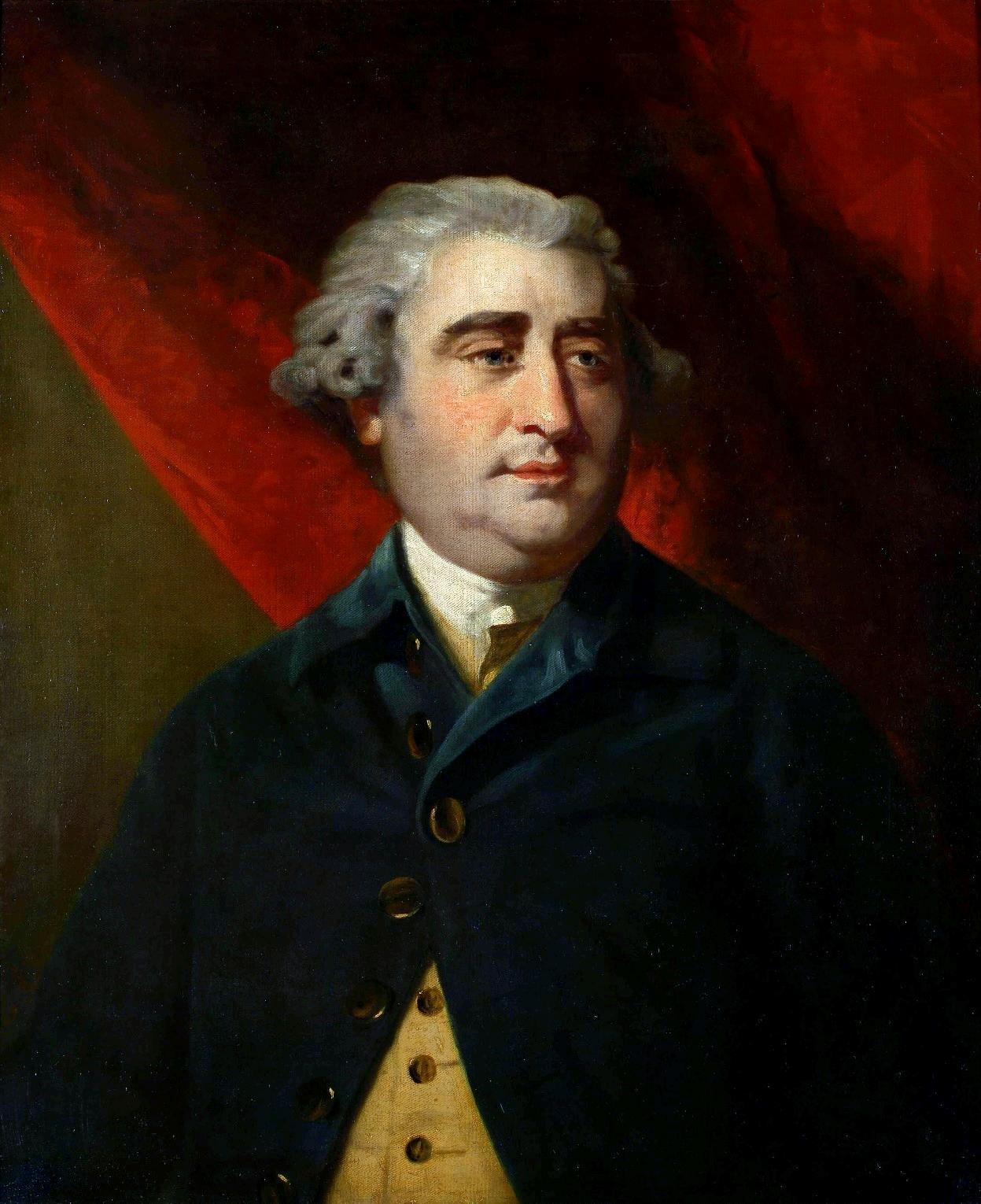
| | First party | Second party |
|---|---|---|
| Leader | William Pitt | Charles James Fox |
| Party | Pittite | Foxite |
| Leader's seat | Cambridge University | Westminster (also Tain Burghs in the interim) |
| Seats won | 280 | 155 |
| Seat change | ▲20 | ▼99 |
- Periwinkle represents Government supporters (Pittites), light orange Opposition supporters (Foxites, Northites), cyan and mauve independents

- Composition of the House of Commons after the election
Prime Minister before election
William Pitt
Pittite
Prime Minister after
election
William Pitt
Pittite

The 1784 British general election resulted in William Pitt the Younger securing an overall majority of about 120 in the House of Commons of Great Britain, having previously had to survive in a House which was dominated by his opponents.

== Background ==
In December 1783, George III engineered the dismissal of the Fox–North coalition, which he hated, and appointed William Pitt the Younger as Prime Minister. Pitt had very little personal support in the House of Commons, and the supporters of Charles James Fox and Lord North felt that the constitution of the country had been violated. The doctrine that the government must always have a majority in the House of Commons was not yet established and Fox knew he had to be careful.

On 2 February 1784 Fox carried a motion of no confidence which declared "That it is the Opinion of this House, That the Continuance of the present Ministers in their Offices is an Obstacle to the Formation of such an Administration as may enjoy the Confidence of this House, and tend to put an End to the unfortunate Divisions and Distractions of the Country" by 223 to 204. Pitt remained in office, and government supporters ensured petitions and resolutions of borough corporations were presented to Parliament to encourage members to back Pitt, and slowly Members changed sides.

By 1 March, Fox's motion which concluded by "beseech[ing] His Majesty, that He would be graciously pleased to lay the Foundation of a strong and stable Government, by the previous Removal of His present Ministers" was carried but only by 201 to 189. A week later, a more strongly worded motion threatening the withholding of supply was also passed—but only by 191 to 190. Fox thereafter declined to push motions, as his base continued to crumble. Pitt meanwhile decided to go to the country and on 24 March, Parliament was prorogued and on the following day the Parliament first elected in 1780 was dissolved.

== Course of the election ==
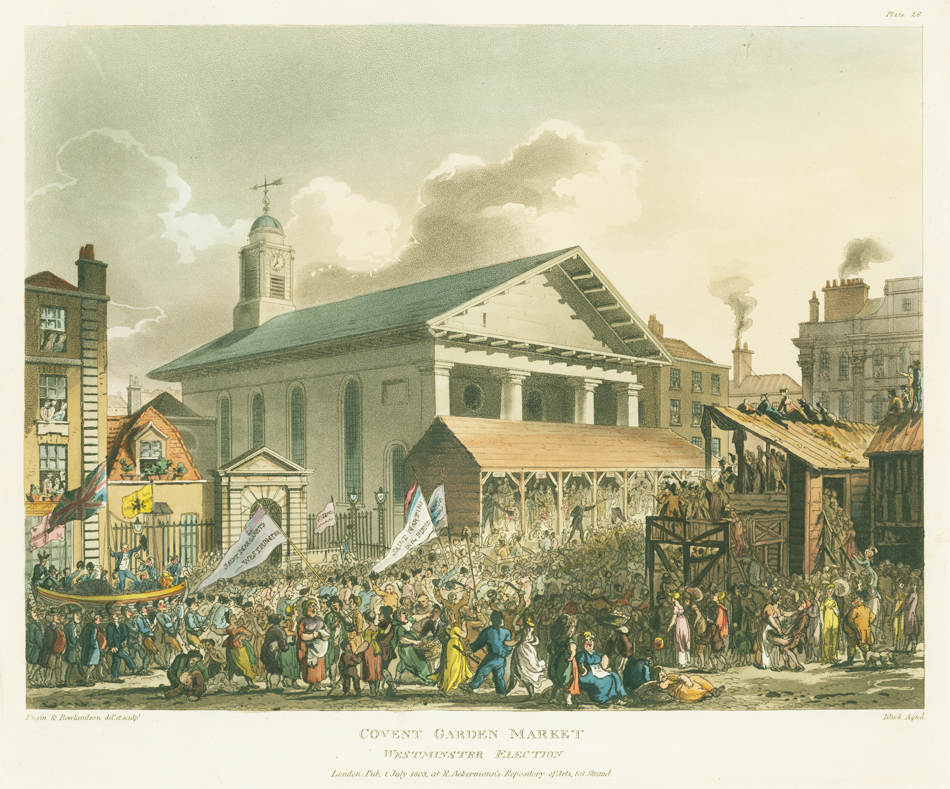
Thomas Rowlandson and Augustus Pugin Covent Garden Market, Westminster Election

The election was fought very much as a national campaign around the questions of the fall of the Fox–North government and whether or not Pitt should continue in office, rather than a series of local campaigns, which was more common for 18th century British elections.

Thanks to a combination of patronage and bribes paid by HM Treasury, many small pocket boroughs returned Pitt-supporting MPs as widely expected. Additionally, in the constituencies decided by large electorates there was massive support for candidates who backed Pitt. Many of Fox's supporters were forced either to withdraw or to make deals with their opponents to avoid electoral defeat. In the county constituencies only one Fox supporter was elected in a contest, although others returned due to local electoral pacts. Those Members who had remained in opposition, refusing to go over to support Pitt, who failed to return to the House of Commons as a consequence, became known as "Fox's Martyrs" in reference to John Foxe's Book of Martyrs (although the majority were supporters of North).

The first day's polling, 30 March, saw thirteen government supporters and four opponents returned. By the conclusion of the fifth day (3 April), there were already more than 150 government Members and a lead of fifty over the supporters of the coalition. The government achieved an overall majority on 15 April and the election ended on 10 May.

== Notable contests ==
=== University of Cambridge ===
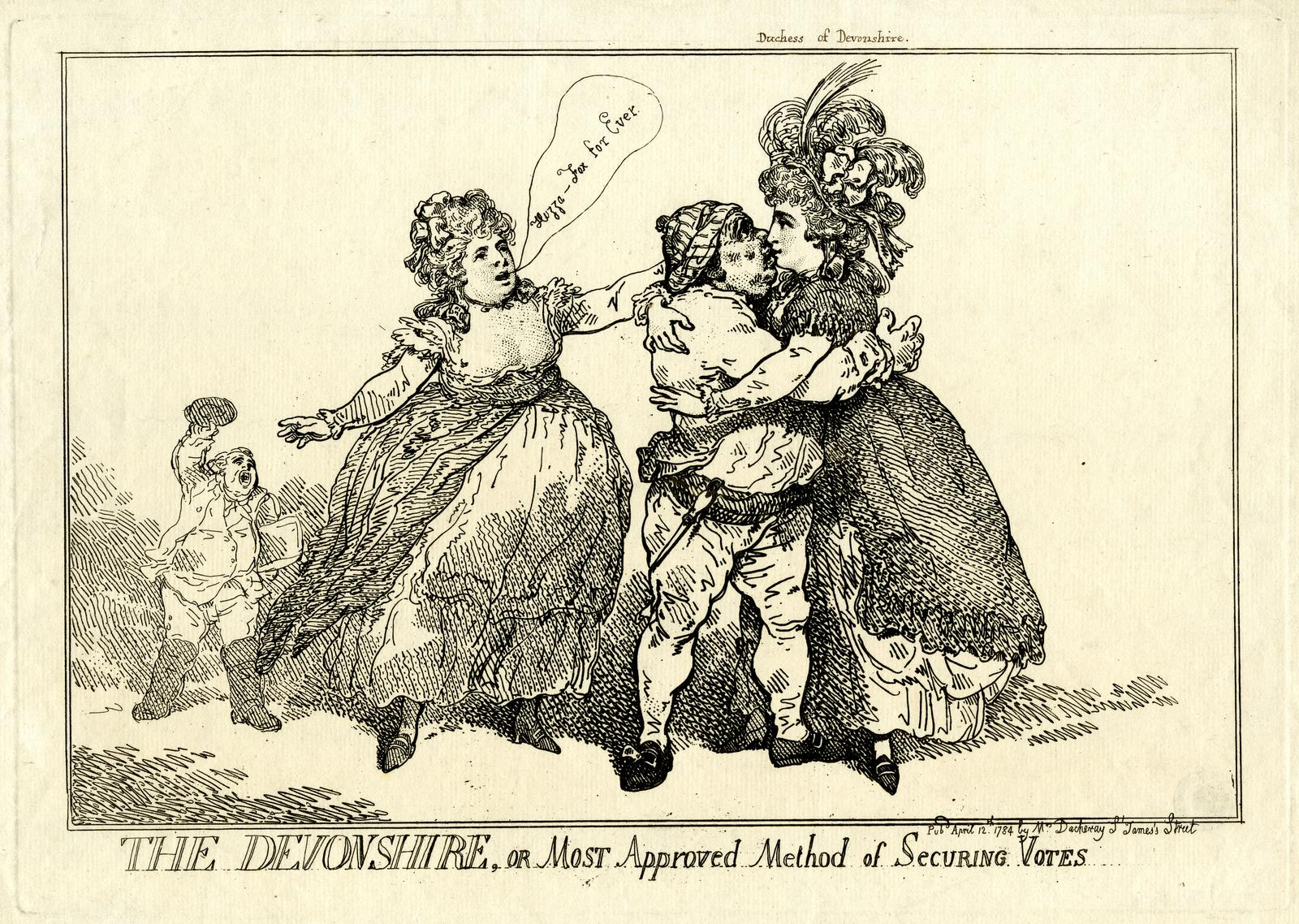
Thomas Rowlandson, THE DEVONSHIRE, or Most Approved Method of Securing Votes, 1784. Georgiana, Duchess of Devonshire, canvassing.

The contests involving both Pitt and Fox attracted particular attention. Pitt had long wished to be a Member of Parliament for the University of Cambridge and had failed to be elected when he stood for the seat in the 1780 general election. Now he was returned at the top of the poll and would hold the seat for the rest of his life.

=== Westminster ===
Fox was one of the two sitting members for the constituency of Westminster, which had the largest electorate of any in the country and a great deal of prestige. His position there was central to his claim to be representing the people. He stood against two Pitt supporters for the constituency's two seats; both sides spent heavily, campaigned bitterly, allegedly libelled and slandered their opponents relentlessly and resorted to all kinds of tactics, including Georgiana, Duchess of Devonshire, touring the streets and, according to the opposition, kissing many voters to induce them to vote for Fox. Even George, Prince of Wales, campaigned for Fox.

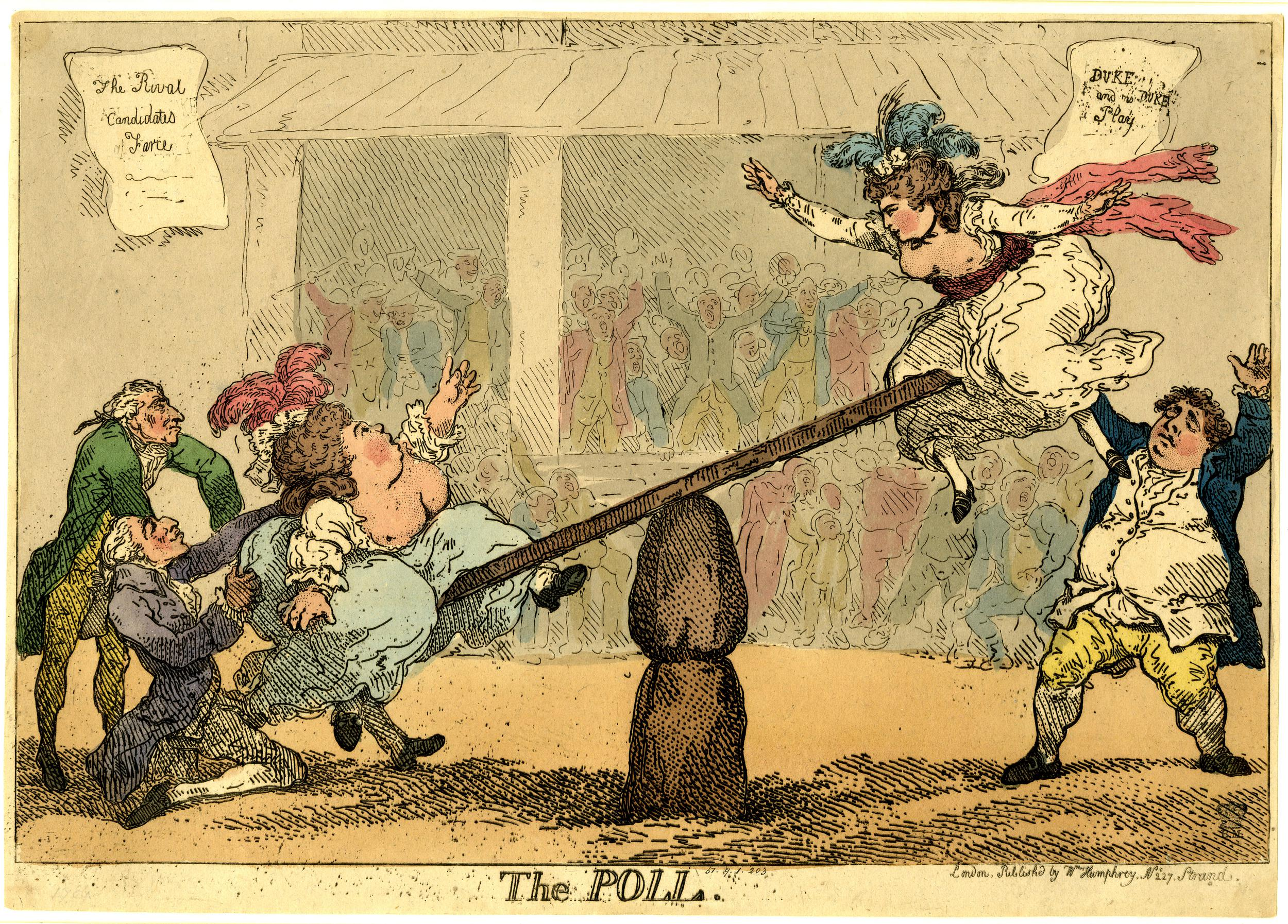
Thomas Rowlandson, The Poll, 1784 (British Museum)

At the conclusion of polling on 17 May, Fox had narrowly succeeded, with 6,233 votes to Sir Cecil Wray's 5,998. However, Pitt's supporters then demanded a scrutiny of the votes and the Returning Officer therefore did not make the return. A scrutiny in a constituency as large as Westminster was an enormously time-consuming process; Fox, suspecting this might happen, had already arranged for his return for the Tain Burghs, which had elected him on 26 April, so that he would not be out of the House during such a scrutiny. The process did not show unexpectedly large numbers of unqualified voters and as the months went by it looked more and more like a political delaying tactic; on 4 March 1785 the House of Commons finally put an end to it by ordering the Returning Officer to declare the result.

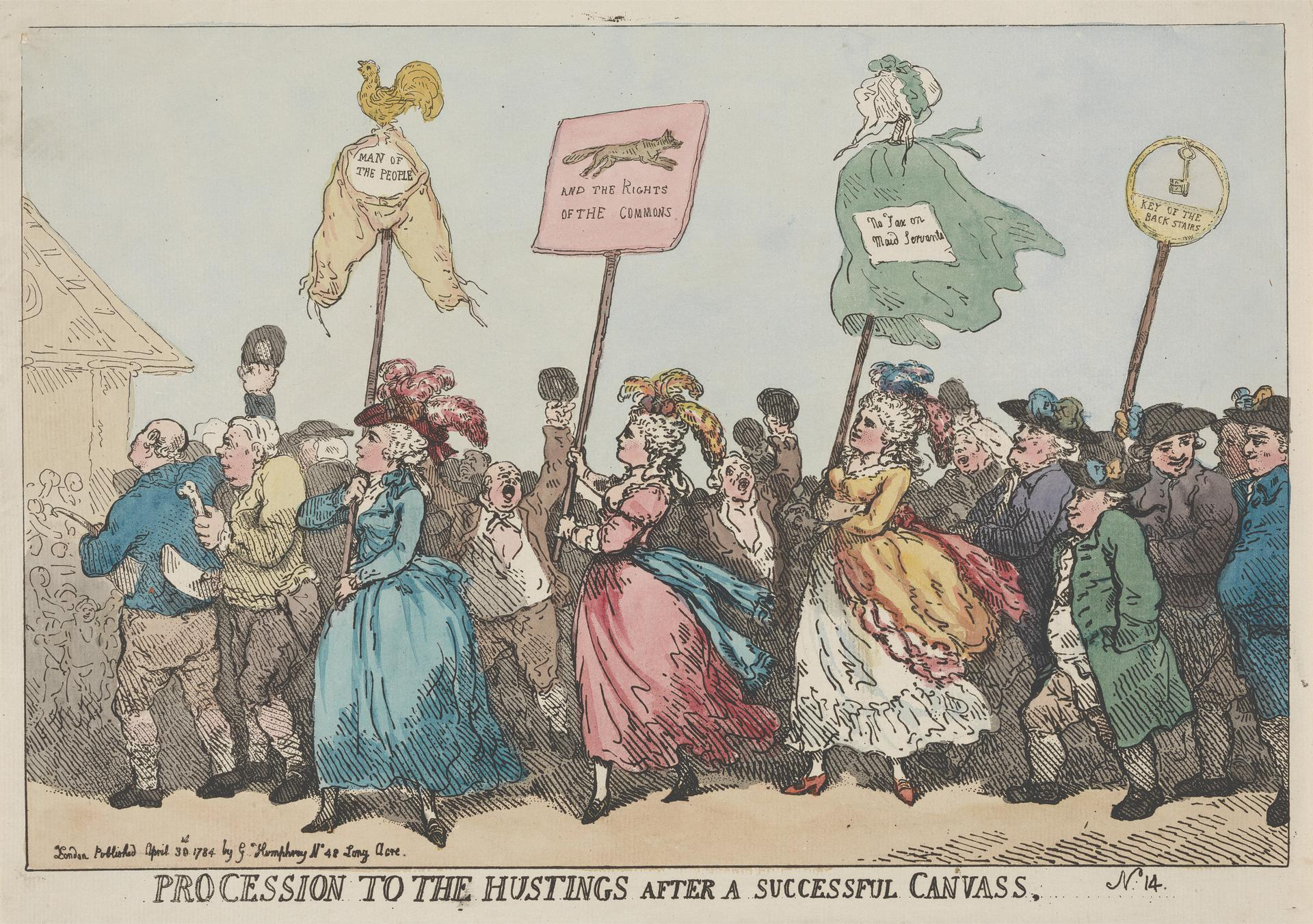
Thomas Rowlandson, Procession to the Hustings after a Successful Canvass, 1784 (Yale Center for British Art)

The election was notable for being one of the first in history in which visual propaganda, in the form of caricatures satirising or promoting the candidates, played a significant role. Caricatures appeared almost daily, allowing the young artists Thomas Rowlandson and James Gillray both to make their names on the strength of their satirical output. After the election, one of the leading London print sellers, William Humphrey, gathered together a number of the election plates to illustrate a detailed blow-by-blow account of the election. It quickly ran to a second edition.

A London constable, Nicholas Casson, was killed during the election.

=== Ipswich ===
The election results were originally recorded as being 490 votes for William Fowle Middleton, 297 votes for John Cator (Whig) and 7 votes for Charles Crickitt (Tory). However, Crickitt filed a petition against Cator's election, accusing him of bribery. The petition was handled by Bamber Gascoyne, who was both Crickitt's political agent and godfather. John Strutt acted on Crickitt's behalf on the House of Commons committee which investigated the allegation. Crickitt also had the support of the Duke of Cumberland. Cator's election was declared void and Crickitt was seated in June 1784.

== Results ==

=== Seats summary ===
Parliamentary seats
| Tory/Pittite | 70.8% |
| Whig/Foxite | 29.1% |

== See also ==
- List of parliaments of Great Britain
- MPs elected in the British general election, 1784

== Bibliography ==
- Laprade, William Thomas (1916), "Public Opinion and the General Election of 1784", English Historical Review, 31 (122): 224–237, doi:10.1093/ehr/xxxi.cxxii.224
- Lock, Alexander (2010), "The Electoral Management of the Yorkshire Election of 1784", Northern History, 47 (2): 271–296, doi:10.1179/007817210x12738429860824, S2CID 143962112
- Lock, Alexander (2016), Catholicism, Identity and Politics in the Age of Enlightenment: The Life and Career of Sir Thomas Gascoigne, 1745–1810, Woodbridge, UK: Boydell and Brewer [esp. chapter 3]
- McAdams, Donald R. (1972), "Electioneering Techniques in Populous Constituencies, 1784–1796", Studies in Burke and His Time, 14 (1): 23–53
- Namier, Lewis; Brooke, John (1964), The History of Parliament: The House of Commons, 1754–1790, vol. 3, London: HMSO
- Phillips, N.C. (1961), Yorkshire and English National Politics 1783–1784, Canterbury, New Zealand: University of Canterbury Press
- Rallings, Colin; Thrasher, Michael, eds. (2000), British Electoral Facts 1832–1999, Farnham, UK: Ashgate[For dates of elections before 1832, see the footnote to Table 5.02]
- Worthington Smith, Robert (1969), "Political Organisation and Canvassing: Yorkshire Elections Before the Reform Bill", The American Historical Review, 74 (5): 1538–1560, doi:10.2307/1841324, JSTOR 1841324
