= Charles D'Oyly =

British public official and painter from Dacca (now Dhaka)

Sir Charles D'Oyly Bt
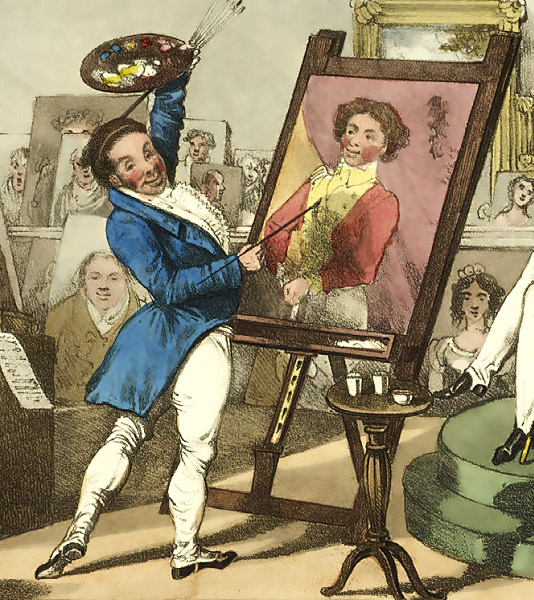
- Tom Roe sits for his portrait in Chinnery's studio by Charles D'Oyly, 1828
- Born: 17 September 1781; Murshidabad, Mughal Empire
- Died: 1845 (aged 63–64); Livorno, Italy
- Known for: Painter, sketcher, administrator, author
- Movement: Orientalism

Sir Charles D'Oyly, 7th Baronet (1781–1845), was a British public official and painter from Dacca (now Dhaka). He was a member of the Bengal Civil Service based in Calcutta, Dacca and Patna from 1797 to 1838. Although he held senior positions with the East India Company's civil service, he is best known as an amateur artist who published many books featuring engravings and lithographs featuring Indian subject matter.

He was notable for being the founder and president of an amateur arts society in Patna called the Behar School of Athens.

== Life and career ==
Charles D'Oyly was born in Murshidabad, Bengal, India on 17 September 1781 into a family that had long served in India. He was the son of Sir John-Hadley D'Oyly, 6th Baronet and Diana Rochfort. His father was the East India Company's resident at the Court of Nawab Babar Ali of Murshidabad.

D'Oyly went to England with the family in 1785 and received his first formal education there. In 1798 he returned to India as Assistant to the Registrar in the Court of Appeal in Calcutta. In 1803 he was appointed Keeper of the Records in the Governor General's office, and in 1805, he married his cousin, Marian Greer, daughter of William Greer.

From 1808 to 1817, he was Collector of Dacca. Here, D'Oyly met George Chinnery, who spent a great deal of time staying with D’Oyly during his early career. The pair became close friends and went on several expeditions together. Chinnery had a considerable influence on the development of D'Oyly's artistic style and painted at least two portraits of the D'Oylys.

In 1815 or 1817 (the date is disputed), D'Oyly married Elizabeth Jane Ross, daughter of Major Thomas Ross. After his father's death in 1818, D'Oyly inherited the baronetage and received a knighthood; also in 1818, he became City Collector of Customs in Calcutta. Francis Rawdon-Hastings, Marquess of Hastings, the Governor-General, was very taken with D’Oyly, who served as the Governor's aide-de-camp whenever he was in Calcutta.

The D’Oylys were sociable, hospitable, witty conversationalists and active members of colonial society, but they were not snobs and disliked the formality and pretensions associated with English society in India. They regularly invited new British arrivals as guests in their private home, often for extended periods. Brian Houghton Hodgson stayed with the couple when he first arrived in India in the 1820s; the D’Oylys introduced him to society and helped him establish connections with high officials of the Indian government. Hodgson and the D’Oylys shared an interest in the arts, and became lifelong friends.

From 1821 to 1831, D'Oyly was Opium Agent of Bihar and Commercial Resident of Patna; this was one of his most productive periods, and he produced numerous paintings and sketches. In July 1824, he founded an amateur art society which he named "United Patna and Gaya Society" or "Behar School of Athens", with the objective of "the promotion of Arts and Sciences and […] the circulation of fun and merriment of all descriptions." He also established his own publishing operation, the Bihar Lithography Press, to publish his lithographs and engravings, employing Jairam Das, a Patna artist trained in the Mughal tradition, as his assistant.

Between 1832 and 1833, D'Oyly took leave at the Cape of Good Hope, returning to Calcutta to become the Senior Member of the Board of Customs, Salt, Opium and of the Marine. After working for the Company for forty years, D'Oyly's failing health compelled him to retire and leave India in 1838. The greater part of the rest of his life was spent in Italy; he died in Livorno on 21 September 1845 without issue.

== Works ==
D'Oyly sketched incessantly and took an active interest in the arts generally, finding these leisure pursuits to be an agreeable way to relieve the boredom associated with colonial life. He produced landscapes, scenes of Indian life, portraits, and caricatures, primarily in watercolour, and also wrote satirical verse. His work was influenced by his friend, the painter, George Chinnery, who stayed with D’Oyly and his wife in Dacca in 1802–03. A unique feature of his illustrations is the representation of relations between colonials and Indians. Unlike other artists of the period, D’Oyly was not afraid to depict drunkenness and debauchery in his illustrations. His published work, which was invariably heavily illustrated, encompassed a variety of subject matter, from natural history to social satire, and was occasionally written in verse.

During his time in Dacca, he painted a wide variety of pictures, especially the Mughal ruins which he published in a folio-size book with fifteen engravings entitled Antiquities of Dacca in 1814, with reprints from 1823 onwards. A short historical account of Dacca was appended to each book, written by James Atkinson, with engravings by Edwin Landseer. Antiquities of Dacca became an important social document of the period.

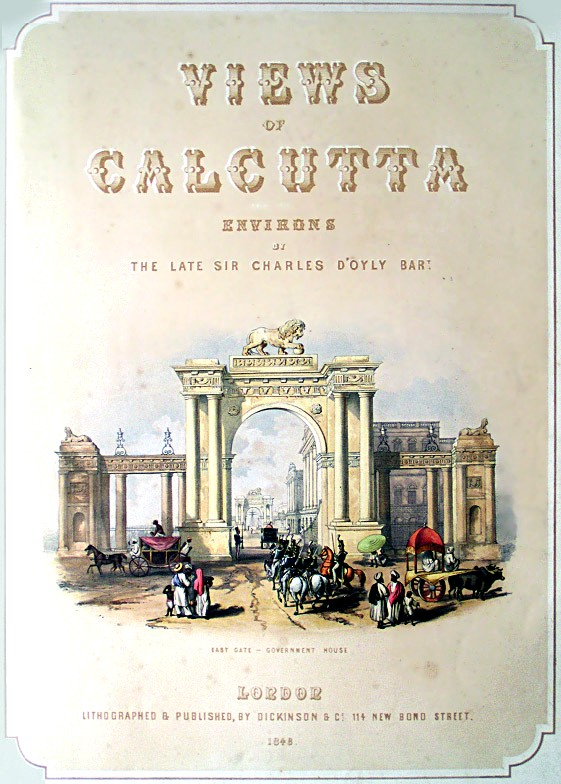
Cover of Views of Calcutta, 1848

In Patna, D’Oyly was at the centre of a flourishing artistic circle made up of both British and Indian artists. British artists in India, including D’Oyly, Chinnery and Webb Smith, exposed local native artists to landscapes, natural history and portraiture. On the other hand, native techniques and a local touch imbued the British paintings with an identifiable Anglo-Indian character; a blend of Indian and European traditions that ultimately became known as Company painting.

His 1828 work Tom Raw, the Griffin (which scholars believe was one of his earliest books, in around 1811) is an illustrated satirical novella in verse which relates the adventures of a cadet in the East India Company.

At times, he collaborated with other scholars. One such collaboration was with the diplomat and scholar Christopher Webb Smith, his wife's first cousin, whose primary interest was ornithology. They published Feathered Game of Hindostan (1828) and Oriental Ornithology (1829); Webb Smith depicted the birds and foliage, and D'Oyly the backgrounds. The two also worked on The Birds, Flowers, and Scenery of the Cape, which was never published. He also collaborated with Captain Thomas Williamson on The Costumes and Customs of Modern India (c. 1830).

Although his artistic output was an amateur activity in the sense that it did not interfere with his position at the East India Company, his work was far from amateurish. His scenes of British life in India in the early 19th-century attracted a large audience, especially amongst members of colonial society. His publications were sold in London where they were popular amongst those with an interest in the Orient.

He has been described as possessing "the accomplishments of a man of taste, sketched cleverly in watercolours, and [...] the leading dilettante of Calcutta society at that time" and “the most prolific artist in India of his time”. Bishop Heber, who visited Patna in 1824, described D’Oyly as the “best gentleman artist I ever met”.

=== Select list of publications ===
The majority of his publications were folios of engravings or lithographs. Certain publications included a substantial amount of text. Those published in conjunction with Christopher Webb Smith, for example, included a two to three-page description accompanying each illustration, with the commentary provided by Captain Thomas Williamson.

Sole-authored

- Antiquities of Dacca, London, 1814 – a folio of 40 engravings
- Behar Amateur Lithographic Scrapbook, Patna, Lithographic Press, 1830 – 36 lithographs (includes drawings by George Chinnery, Lady D’Oyly and others)
- Tom Raw, the Griffin, 1828 – an illustrated social satire in verse
- Indian Sports, Patna, Behar Lithographic Press, 1829
- Costumes of India, Behar Lithographic Press, 1830
- Sketches of the New Road in a Journey from Calcutta to Gyah, Asiatic Lithographic Company's Press, 1830
- Views of Calcutta and its Environs, 1848
- Eight Months’ Experience of the Sepoy Revolt in 1857, Henry Shipp, 1891

Collaborations

- The European in India, Edward Orme, 1813 – with text by Thomas Williamson and illustrations by D’Oyly and others
- The Costumes and Customs of Modern India Edward Orme, London, 1813 - with text by Thomas Williamson and illustrations by Charles D’Oyly,
- Amateurs Repository of Indian Sketches, Asiatic Lithographic Company Press, 1828 (in collaboration with Philippe Savignhac, George Chinnery and James Princep and others)

with text by Charles Williamson, illustrations by Charles D’Oyly and Christopher Webb Smith

- Oriental Ornithology, Behar Lithographic Press, Patna, 1829 – with text by Charles Williamson and illustrations by Charles D’Oyly and Christopher Webb Smith

== Legacy ==
A number of D’Oyly's publications, have been reprinted in recent editions. Other collections of drawings and notes were published posthumously. Two such works are Daily Life in the Early Eighteen-Thirties Illustrated with the Hitherto Unpublished Johannesburg Album of Sketches (1898) and The Cape Sketchbooks of Sir Charles D'Oyly 1832-1833 (1968).

In 1848 Dickinson & Co., 114 New Bond Street, London, published D'Oyly's Calcutta Drawings in a large folio-size book titled Views of Calcutta and its Environs in 1848. The original drawings for this work were probably made between 1833 and 1838, but some must have been completed between 1839 and 1845, when he was retired. The complete work was published after D'Oyly's death.

== Gallery ==
Engravings from D'Oyly's Antiquities of Dacca first published c. 1814

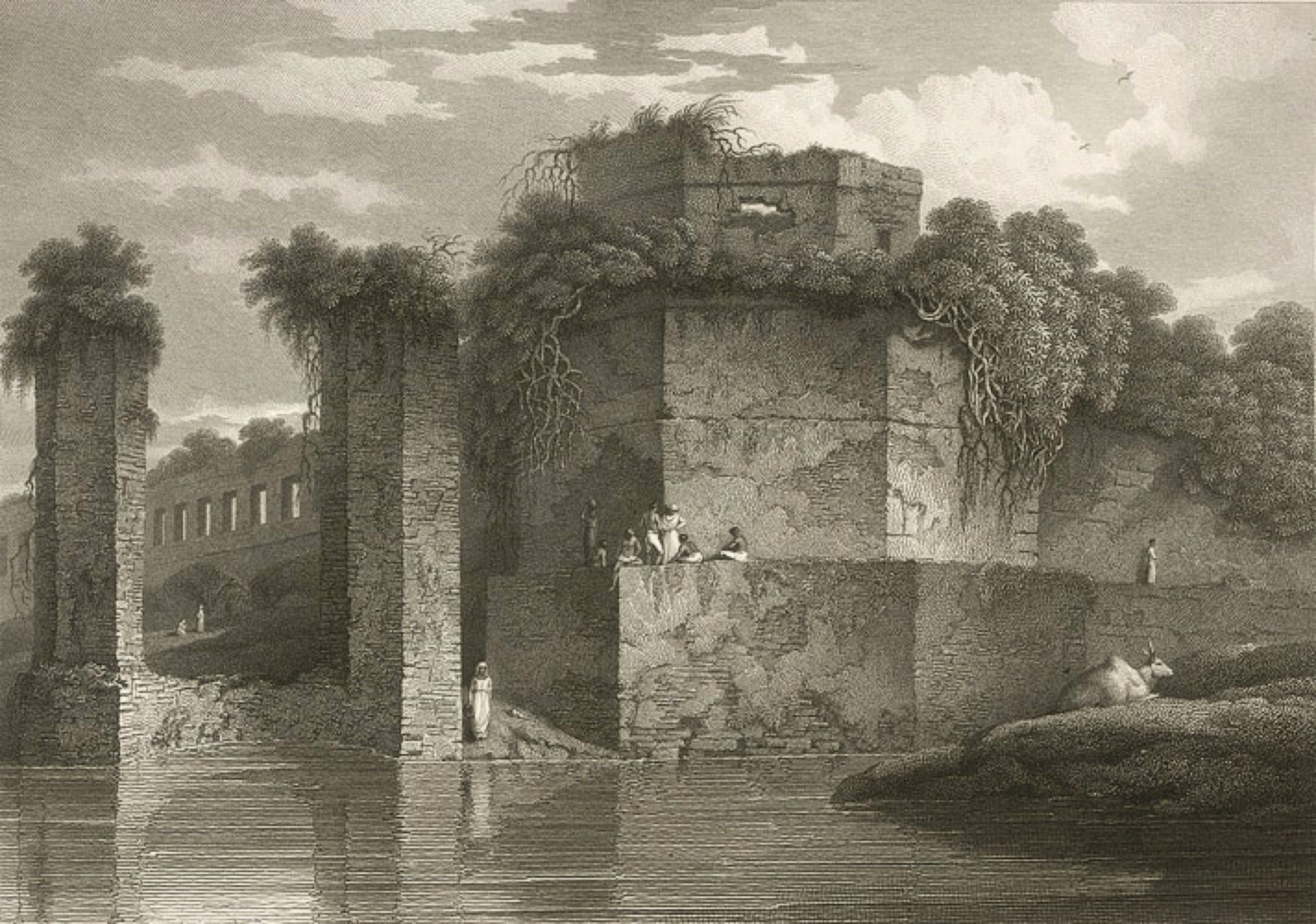
Bastion of the Lal Bagh, Dacca

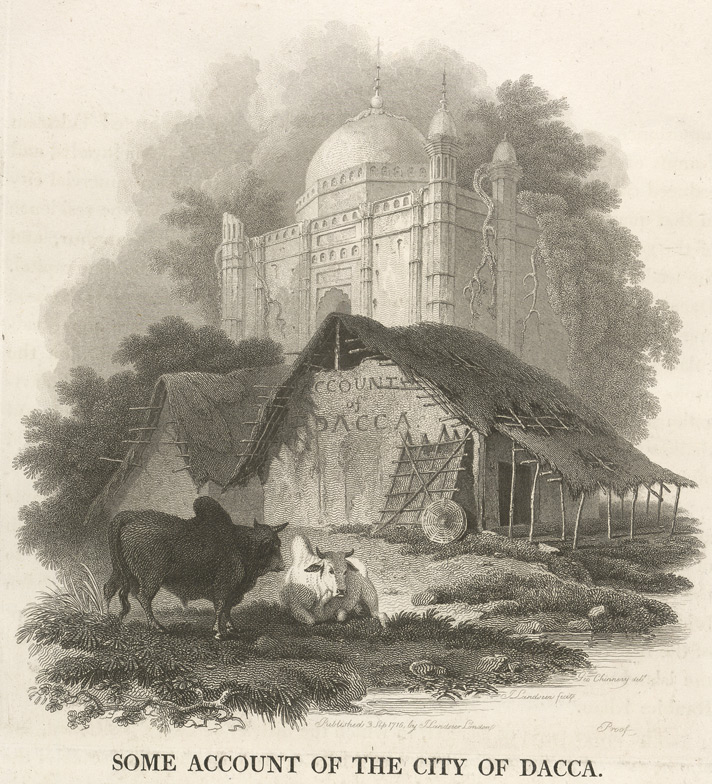
Account of Dacca a Hut beside a Tomb

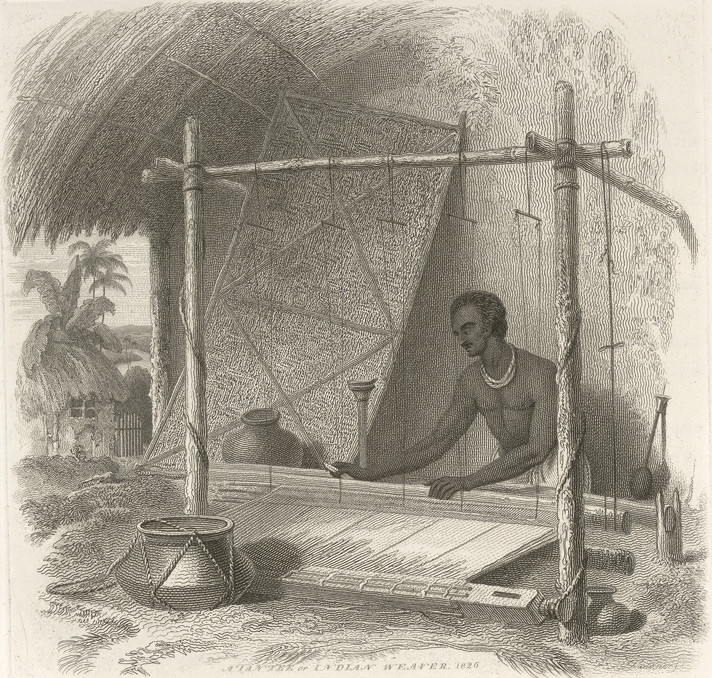
A Tantee or Indian Weaver

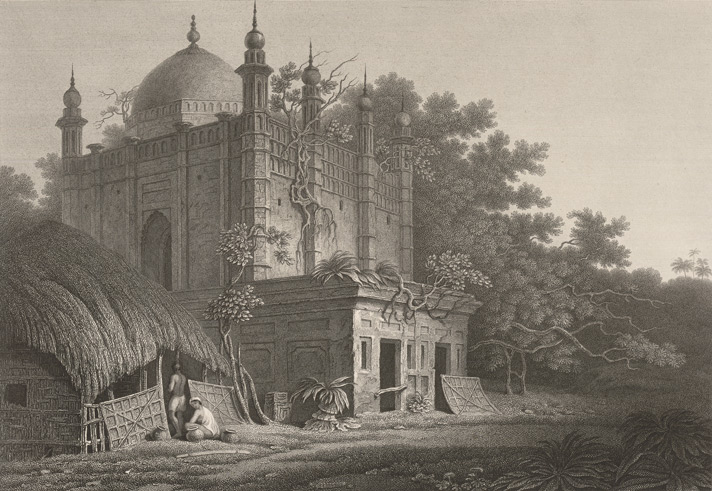
Mosque on the Mug-Bazar road, Dacca

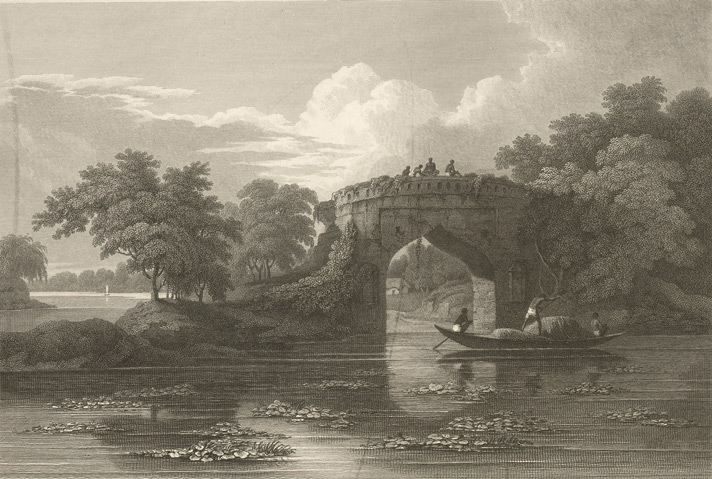
Remains of a Bridge near the Tantee Bazar, Dhaka

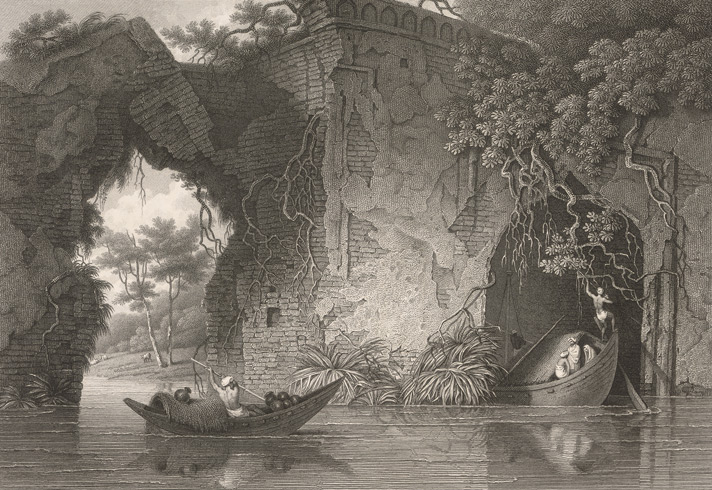
Ruins of Tungy Bridge

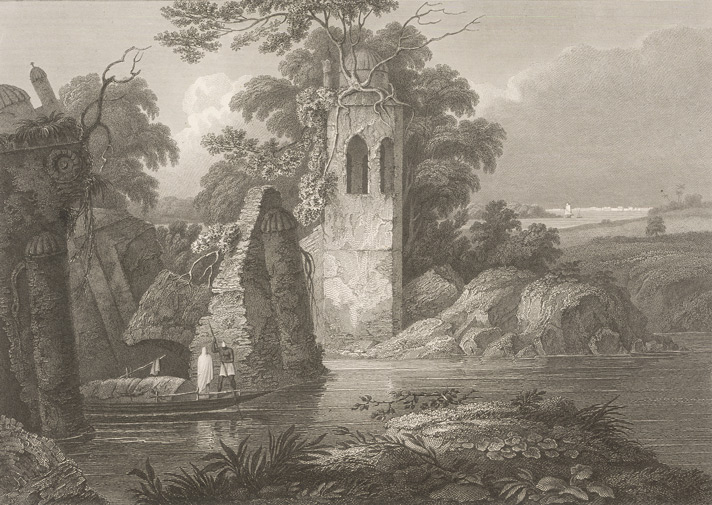
Paugla Pool, with Part of Dacca in the Extreme Distance

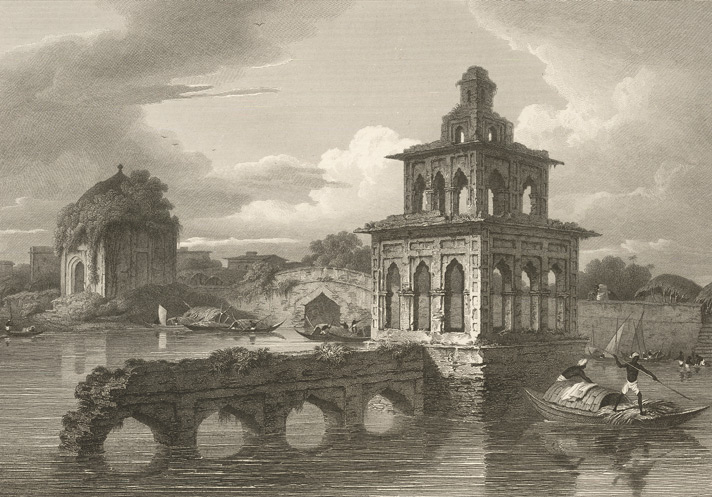
Part of the Interior of the City of Dacca

Prints from D'Oyly's Costumes of India, 1830

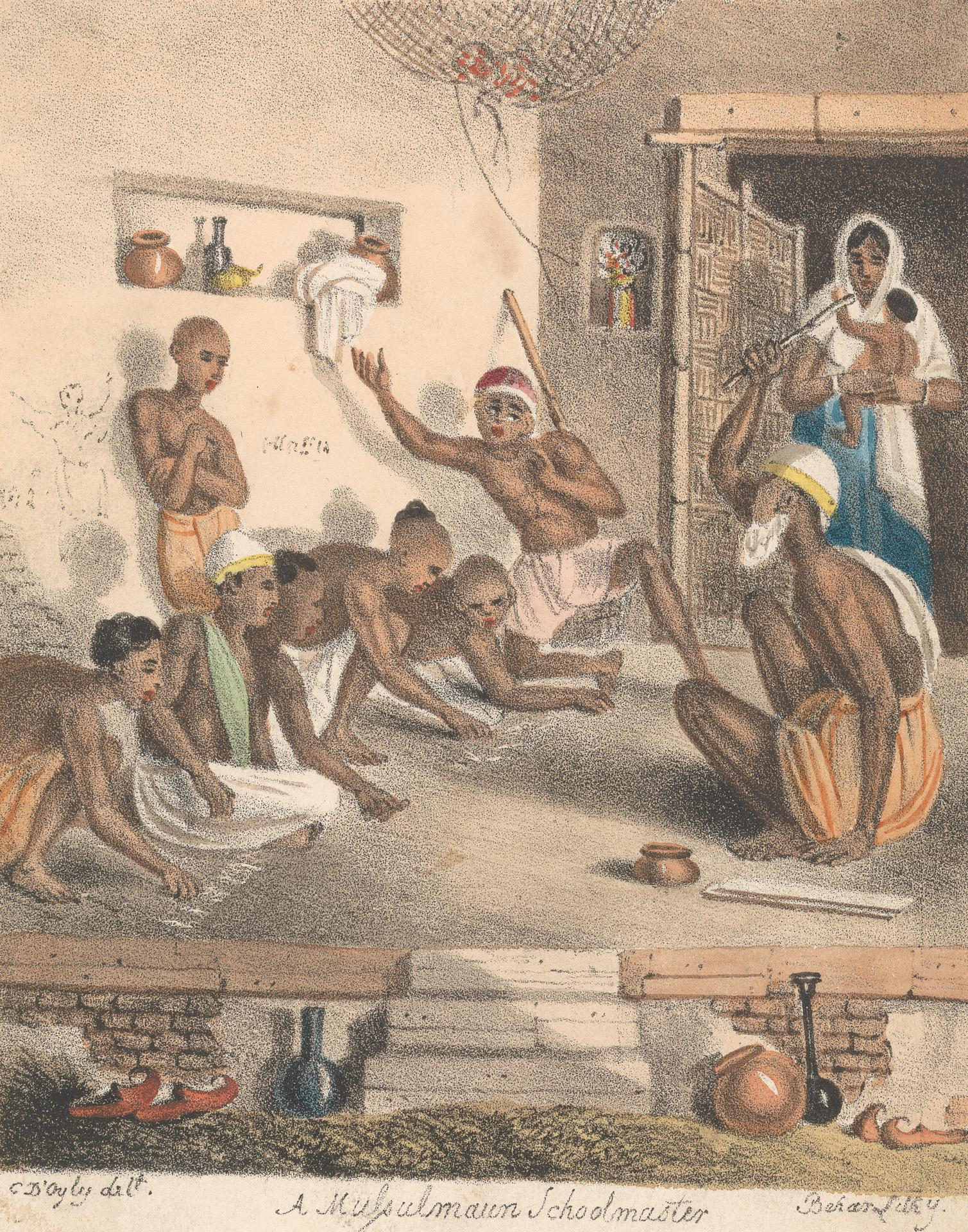
A Mussalmaum Schoolmaster

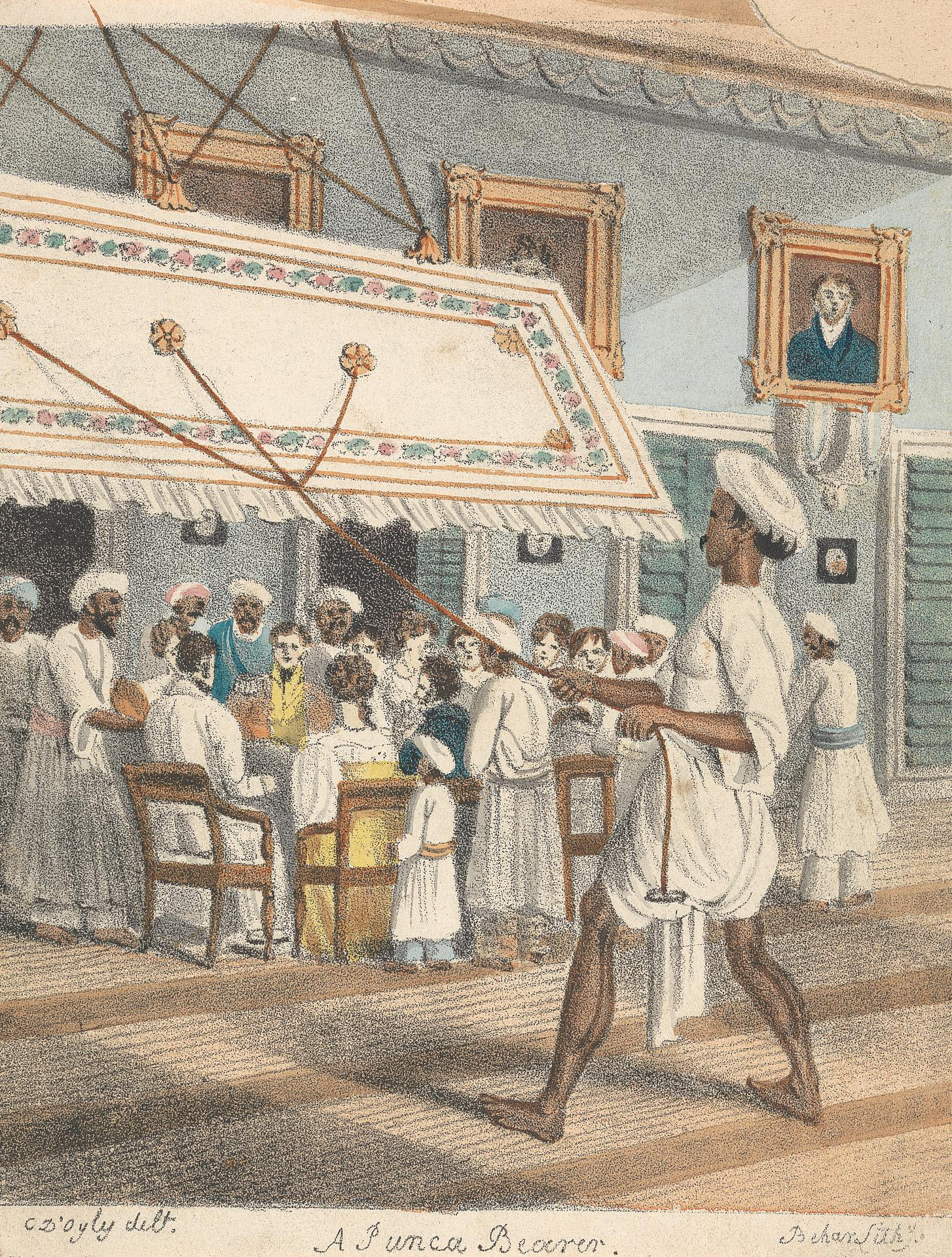
A Punca Bearer

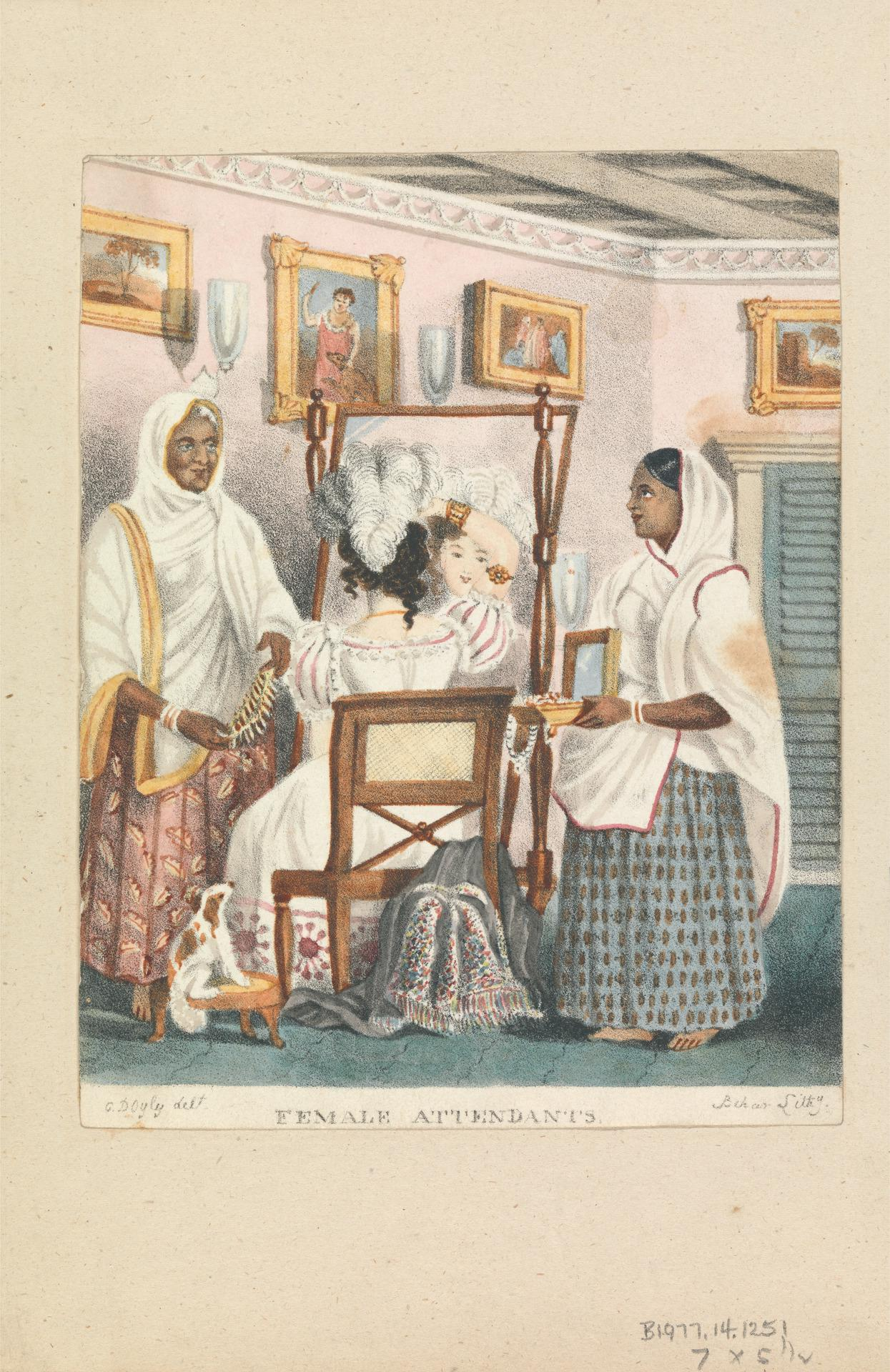
Female Attendants

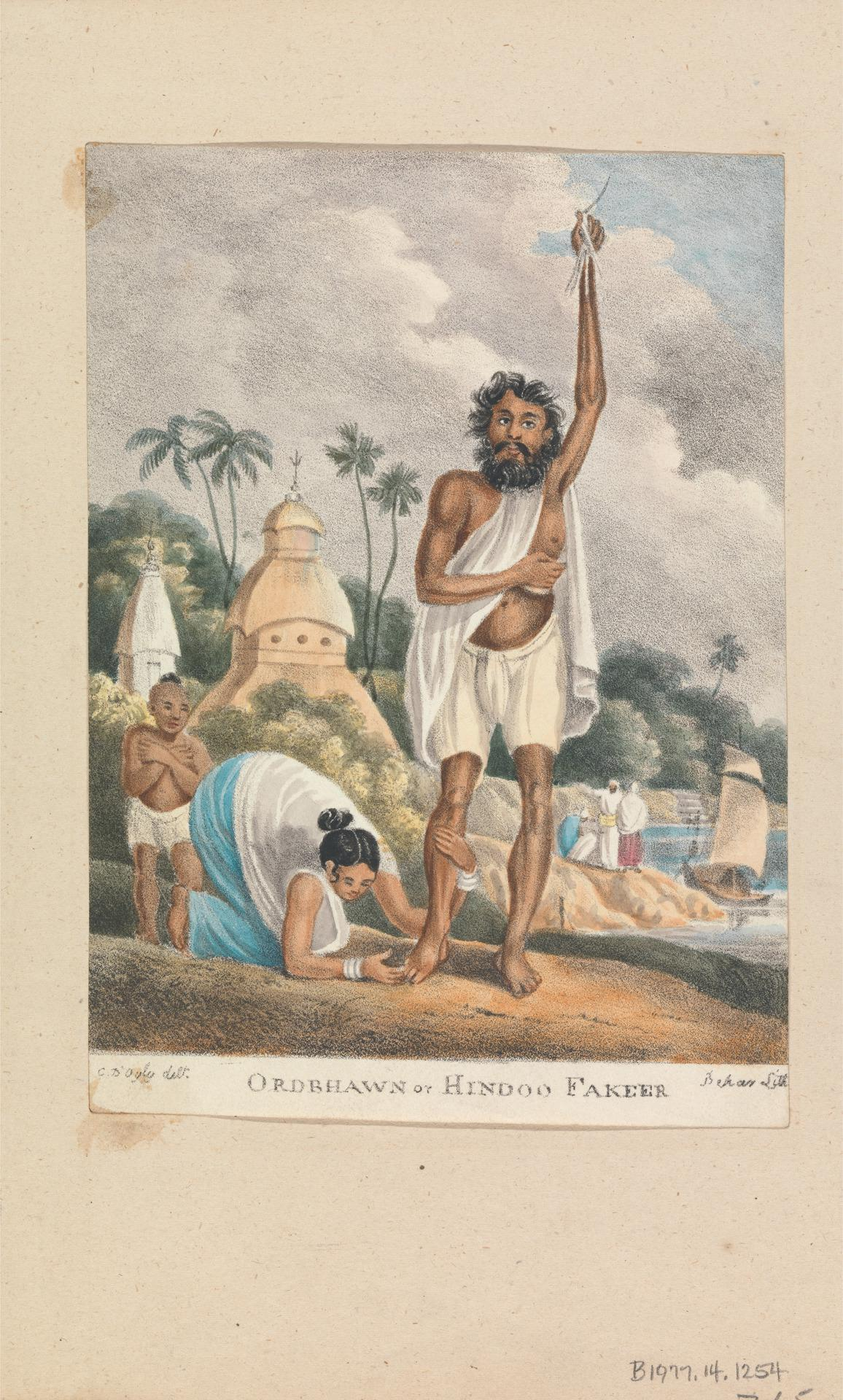
Ordbhawn or Hindo Fakeer

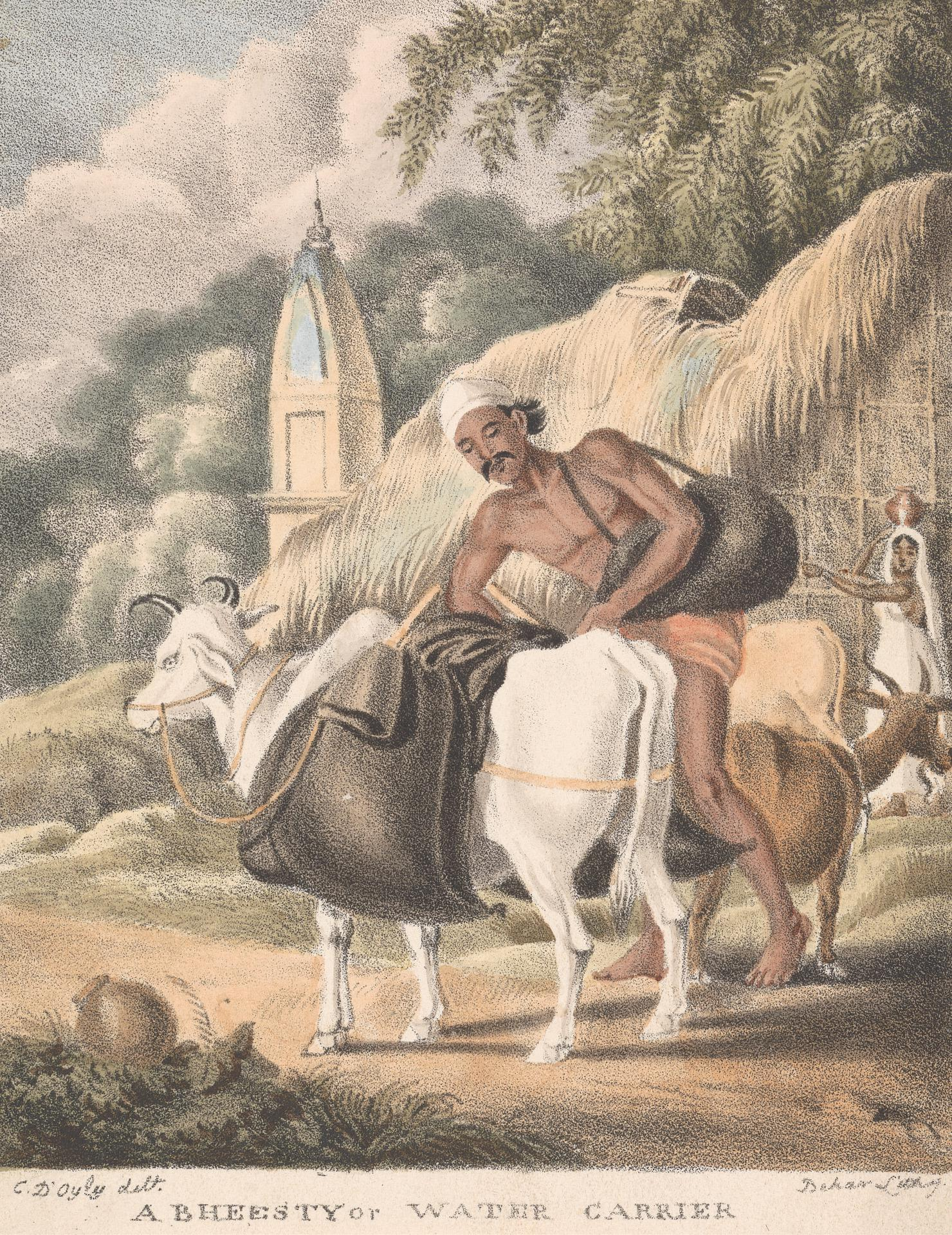
A Bheesty or Water Carrier

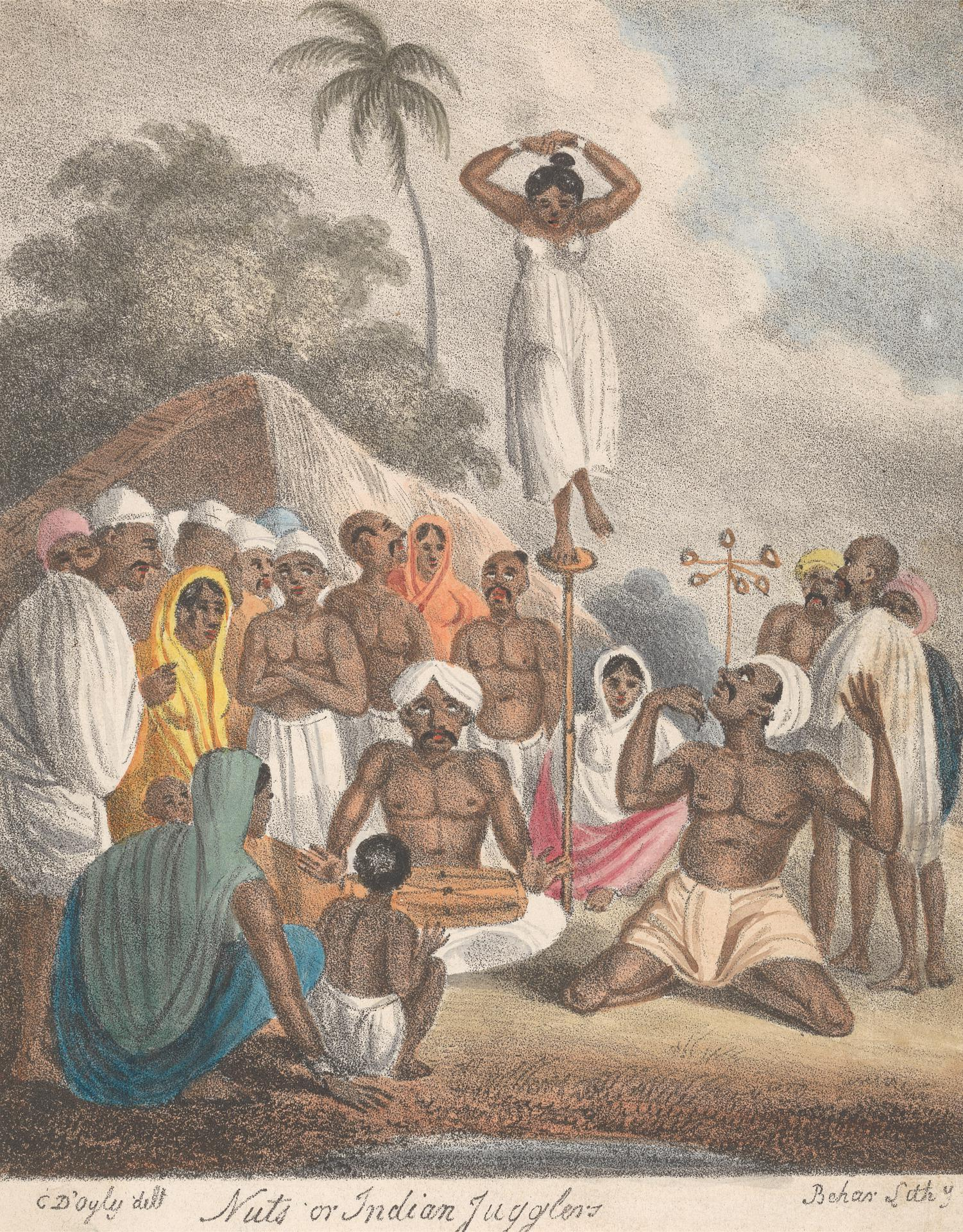
Nuts or Indian Jugglers

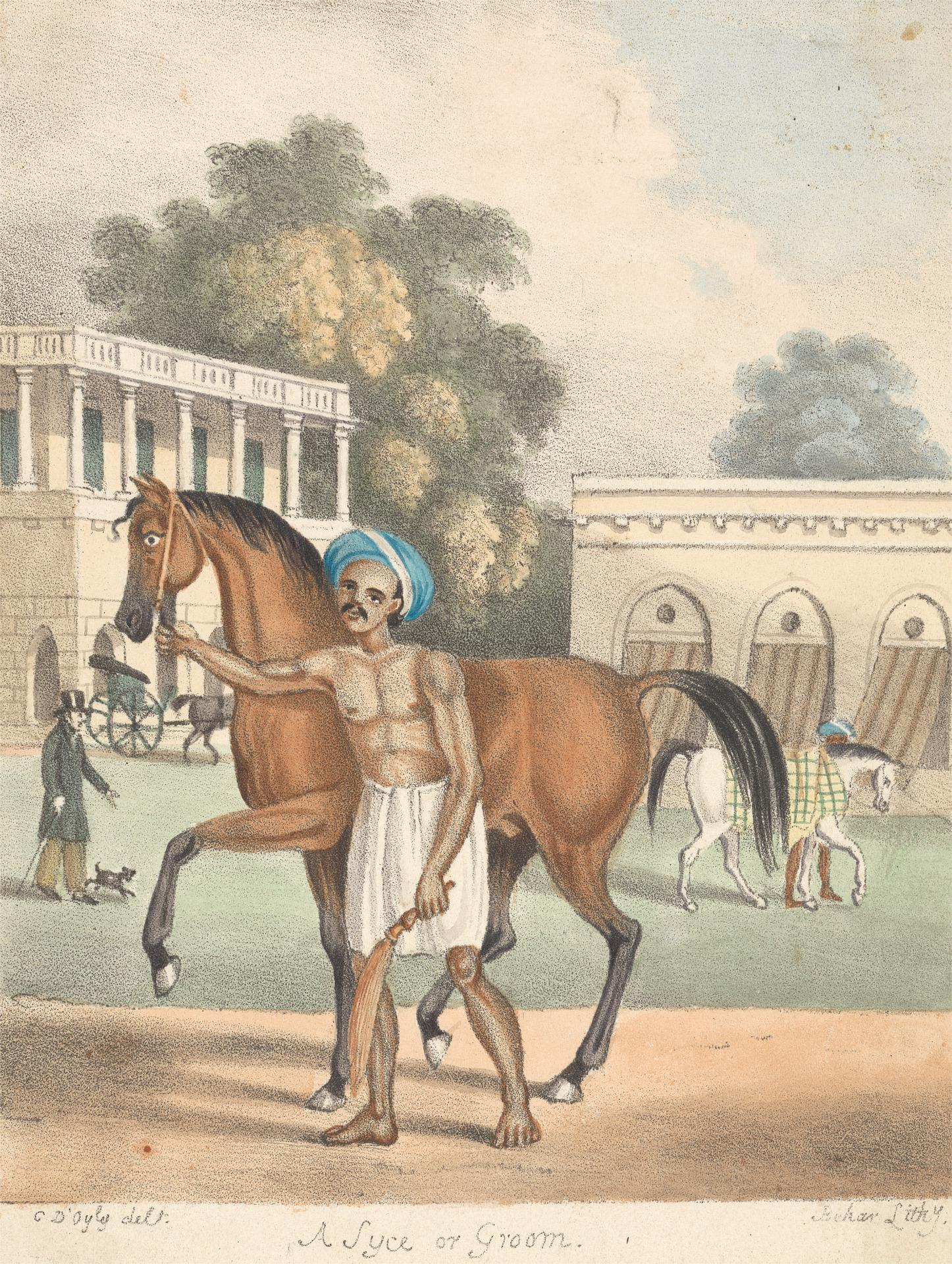
A Syce or Groom

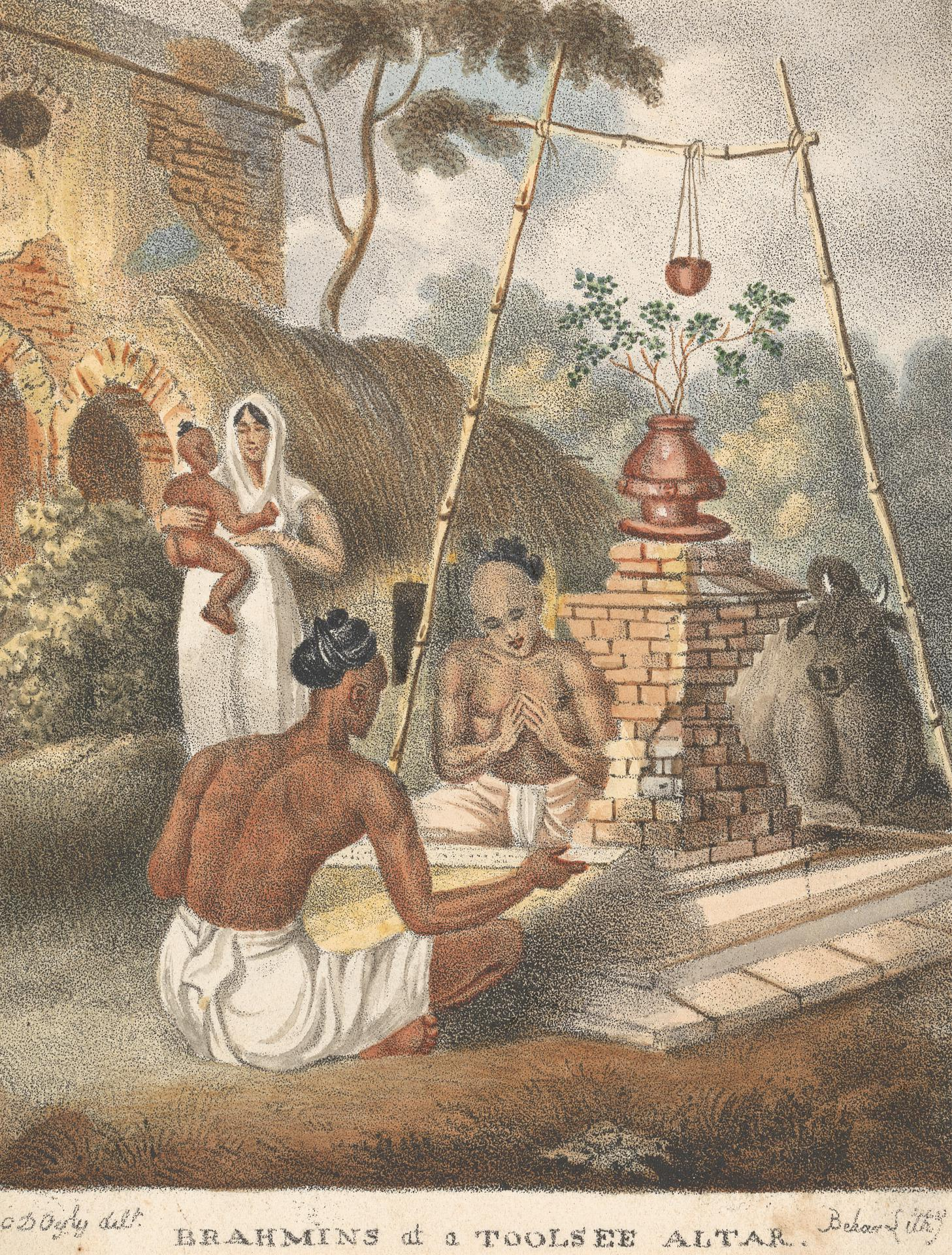
Brahmins at a Toolsee Altar

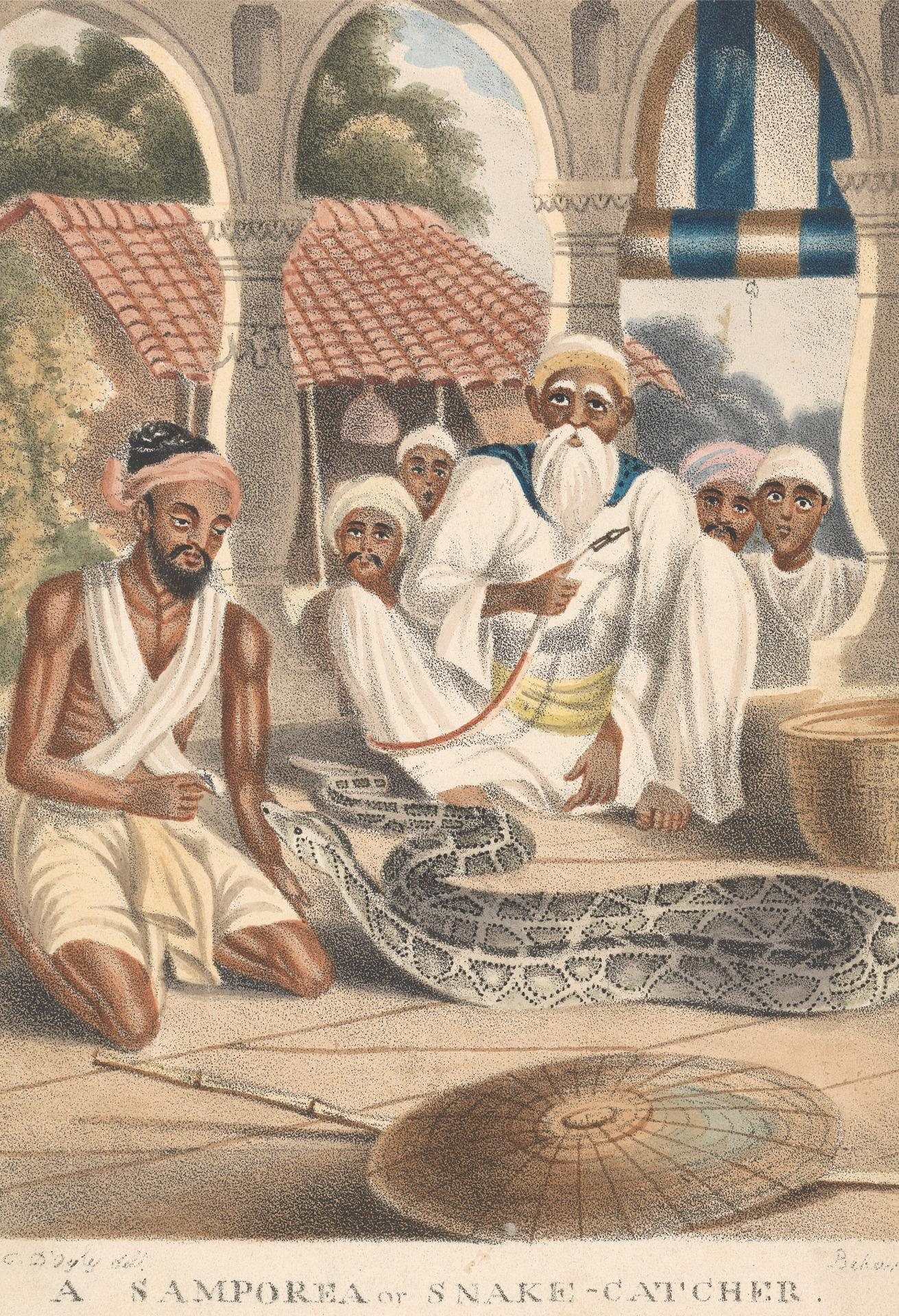
A Samporea or Snake Catcher

Prints from D'Oyly's Views of Calcutta and Environs, 1848

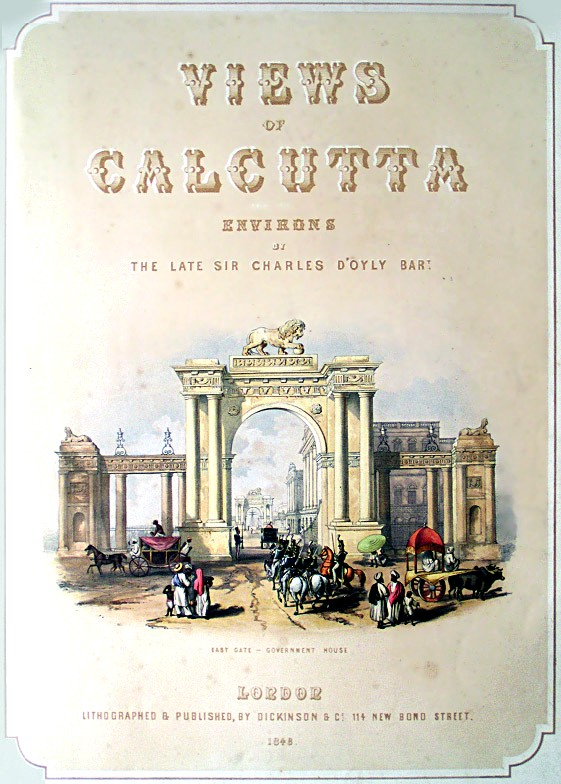
Views of Calcutta and Environs

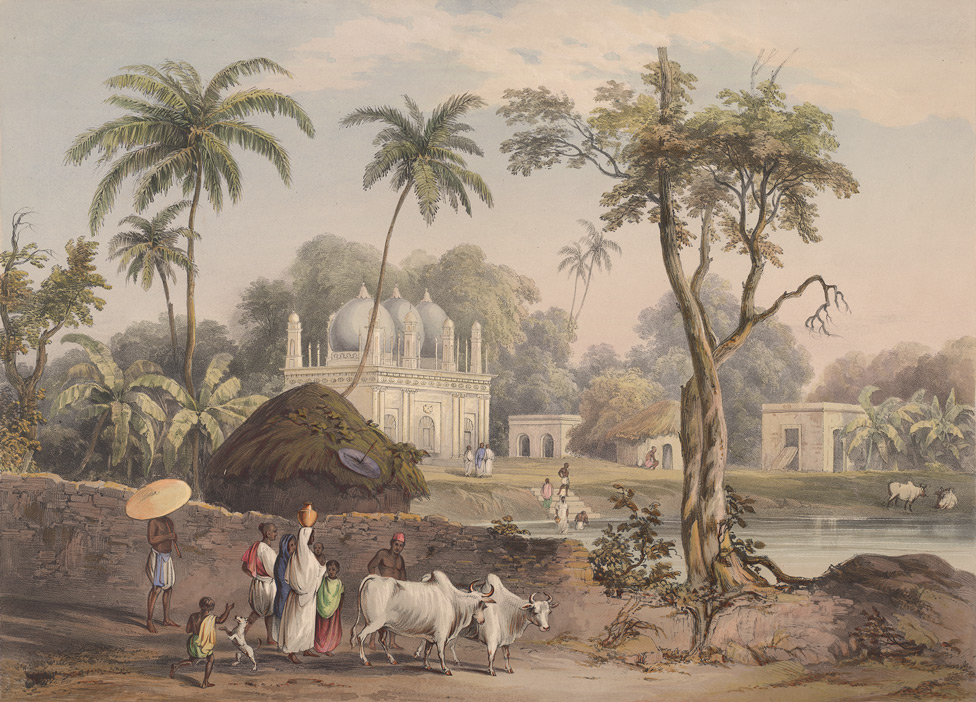
Mosque at Borranipore

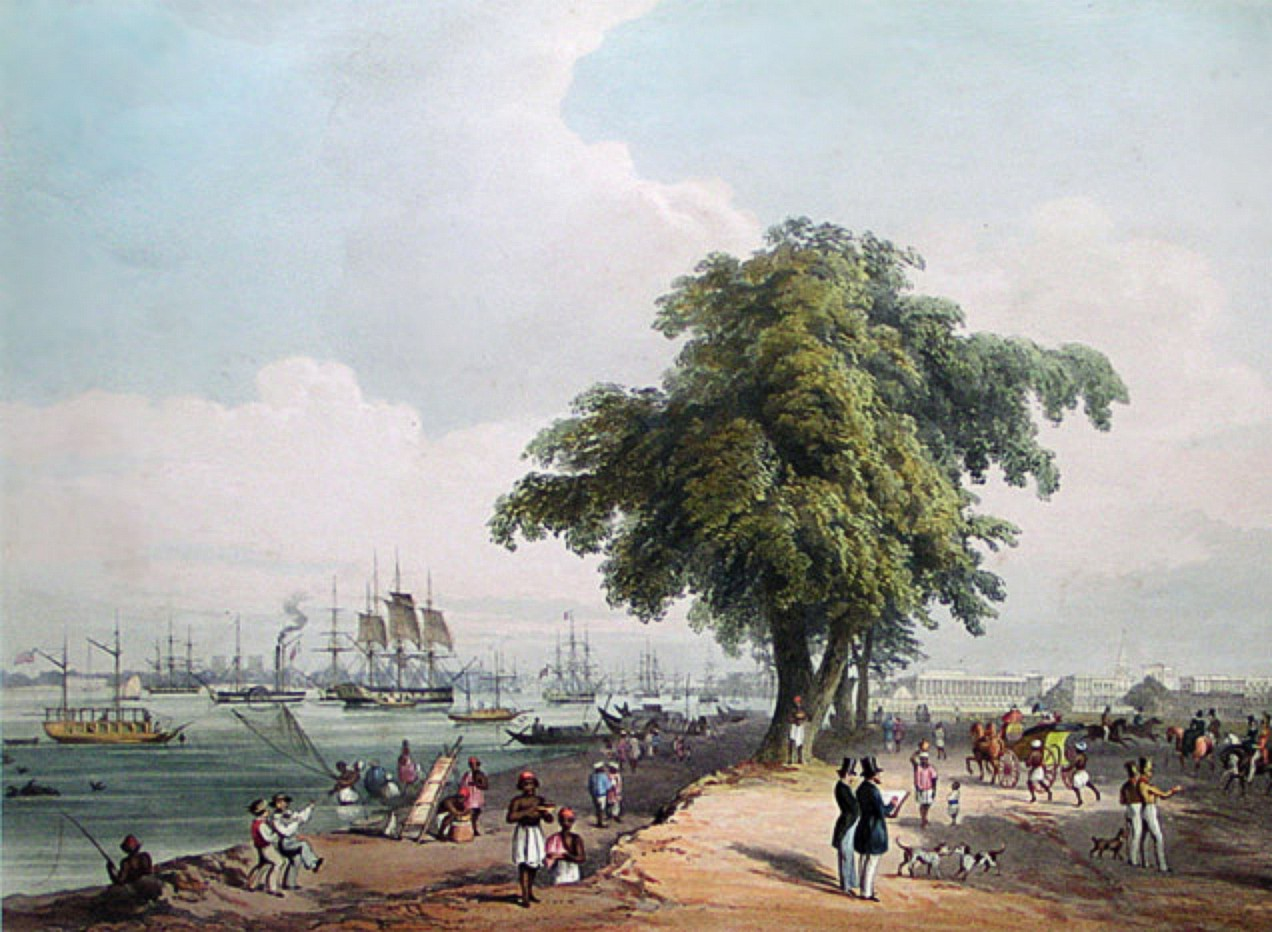
Town and Port of Calcutta

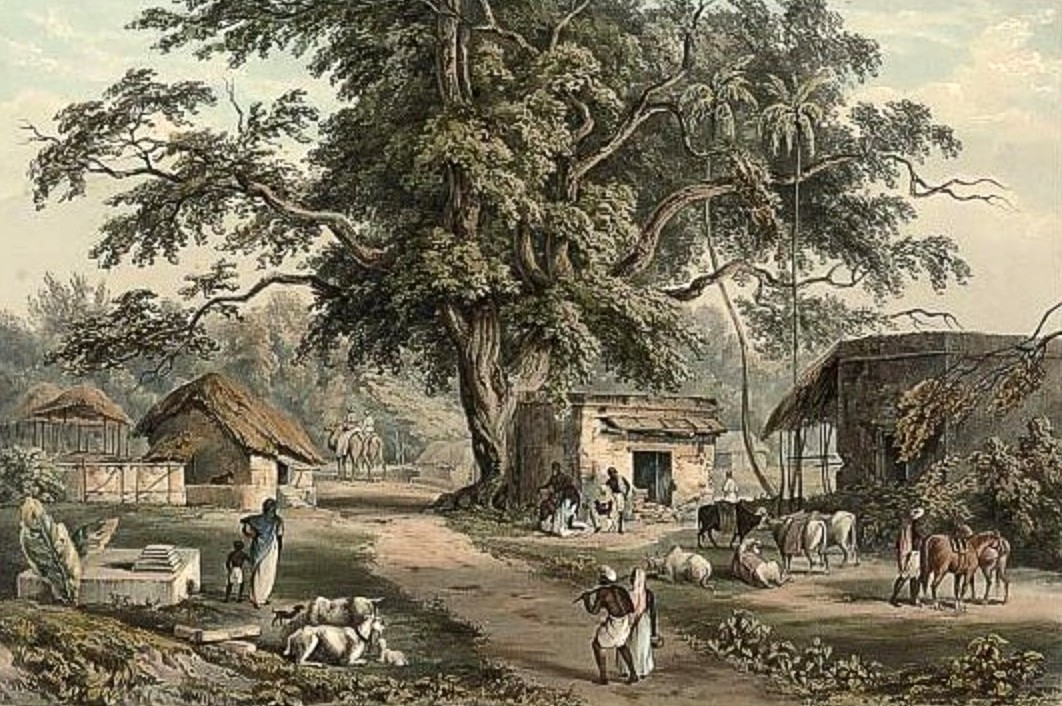
View on the Serampore Road

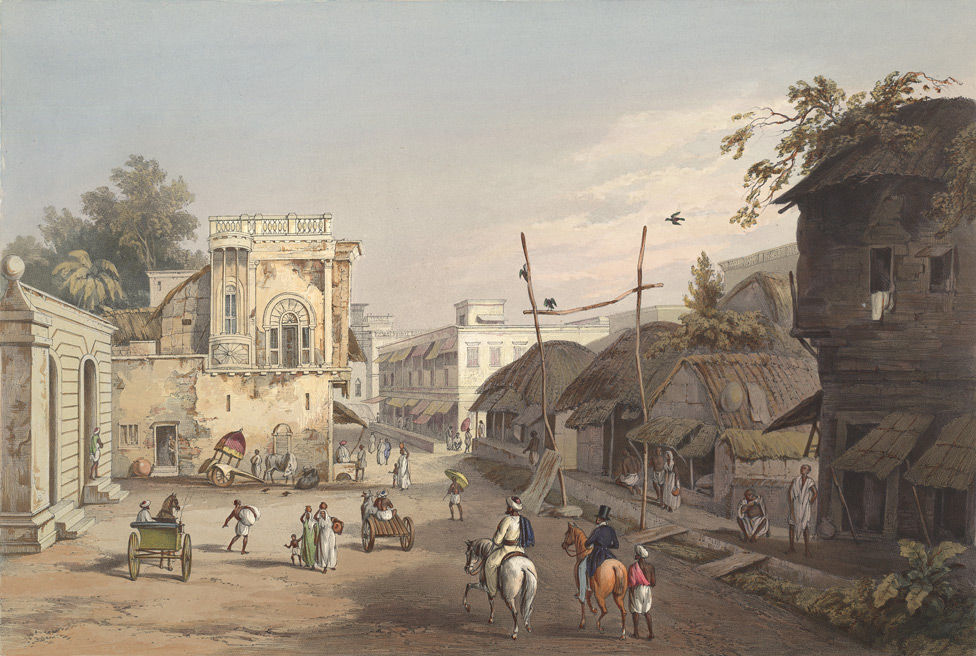
View in Clive Street

== Arms ==
Coat of arms of Charles D'Oyly
Crest Out of a ducal coronet Or two wings erect Sable bezantée between which and resting on the strawberry leaf of the coronet an estoile of six points Argent. Escutcheon Gules three bucks' heads cabossed Argent. Motto Do Noe Ylle Quoth D'Oylle (Do No Ill, Quoth Doyle)

== See also ==
- Company style
- List of Orientalist artists
- Orientalism

Baronetage of the United Kingdom
Preceded by John Hadley D'Oyly	Baronet (of Shottisham); 1818–1845	Succeeded by John Hadley D'Oyly
