= Sir Andrew Hamond, 1st Baronet =

British politician

Captain Sir Andrew Hamond Bt FRS
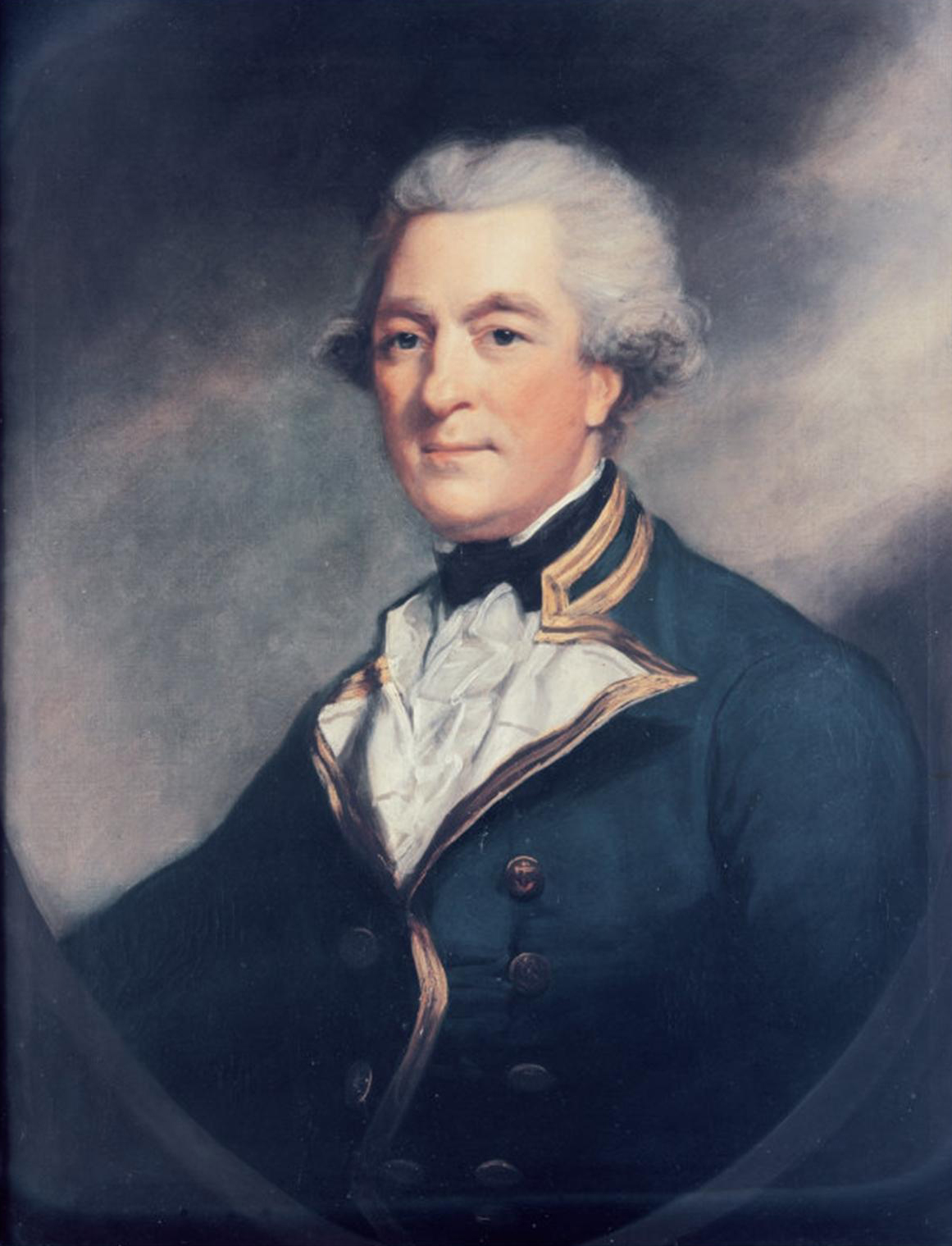
- Sir Andrew Hamond
- Born: 17 December 1738; Blackheath (London), England
- Died: 12 September 1828 (aged 89); Terrington Saint Clement, England
- Military career
- Allegiance: United Kingdom
- Branch: Royal Navy
- Rank: Captain
- Commands: Nore Command

Captain Sir Andrew Snape Hamond, 1st Baronet, FRS (17 December 1738 – 12 September 1828) was a British naval officer and Lieutenant Governor of Nova Scotia from 1781 to 1782 and Comptroller of the Navy from 1794 to 1828.

== Career ==
Born in Blackheath, London, England, the son of Robert Hamond and Susannah Snape, he joined the Royal Navy in 1753 and served during the Seven Years' War and the American Revolution. In 1765, he was made a commander and a captain in 1770. His nephew Andrew Snape Douglas joined under his command in 1770. During the American Revolution he commanded North American station in the Expedition to the Chesapeake (1777) and commanded a warship during the defence of Sandy Hook in 1778, for which he was knighted on January 15, 1779.

From 1780 until 1784, Hamond was appointed Resident Commissioner of the Navy, Halifax Nova Scotia. He was additionally appointed Lieutenant Governor of Nova Scotia in 1781, administering the province in the absence of Governor Francis Legge, who had been recalled to England, but not replaced, some years before. He ordered troops to end the Raid on Lunenburg, Nova Scotia (1782). He had expected to be named Legge's successor, but John Parr was named to the position instead. Offended, Hamond resigned as lieutenant-governor soon after Parr's arrival.

In 1783, Hamond was awarded a baronetcy (see Hamond-Graeme baronets). He became Commander-in-Chief, The Nore in 1785. In 1789, he and his nephew Andrew Snape Douglas, now a captain, were members of the Court for the Court-Martial of the crew members captured on Tahiti who were involved in the Mutiny on the Bounty. He became Comptroller of the Navy from 1794 until March 1806. From 1796 to 1806, he was a Member of Parliament for Ipswich. He was elected a Fellow of the Royal Society in March 1797. In 1806, he retired from public life with an annual pension of £1,500.

== Legacy ==
Settlers of Hammonds Plains, a new settlement outside of Halifax, voted to name their area after the popular Lt. Governor. The Lady Hammond Road, a new main road out of Halifax constructed by Hamond, was named after his wife Cecilia. Cape Hamond in Alaska, now Cape Saint Elias, was also named in his honour, as was the Hammond River in New Brunswick. He is the namesake of Sir Andrew Hammond (1800 ship).

== Family ==
He married Cecilia Sutherland in April 1763. They had no children. He married Anne Graeme in March 1779, the heiress daughter of Major Henry Graeme, later lieutenant-governor of St. Helena. They had two children: Admiral of the Fleet Sir Graham Hamond, 2nd Baronet and Caroline Hamond (who married Lt Col Francis Hood). He died in 1828 aged 89 in Norfolk, and his wife died a decade later on 8 September 1838.

Government offices
Preceded by Sir Richard Hughes	Lieutenant Governor of Nova Scotia; 1781-1783; Served under: Francis Legge	Succeeded by Edmund Fanning
Military offices
Preceded by Sir Richard Hughes	Resident Commissioner, Halifax; 1781–1783	Succeeded by Henry Duncan
Preceded by Sir Walter Stirling	Commander-in-Chief, The Nore; 1785–1788	Succeeded by Richard Edwards
Preceded by Sir Henry Martin	Comptroller of the Navy; 1794–1806	Succeeded by Sir Thomas Thompson
Parliament of Great Britain
Preceded by Sir John Hadley D'Oyly, Bt. and Charles Crickitt	Member of Parliament for Ipswich; 1796–1800; Served alongside: Charles Crickitt	Succeeded by Parliament of the United Kingdom
Parliament of the United Kingdom
Preceded by Parliament of Great Britain	Member of Parliament for Ipswich; 1801–1806; Served alongside: Charles Crickitt, to 1803; William Middleton, from 1803	Succeeded by Richard Wilson and Robert Stopford
Baronetage of Great Britain
New creation	Baronet (of Holly Grove); 1783–1828	Succeeded by Graham Eden Hamond
