= Christopher Webb Smith =

English-born painter and public official

- Born: 1793; Camberwell, England
- Died: 1871 (aged 77–78); Florence, Italy
- Occupations: Civil servant, amateur naturalist, artist and author
- Known for: first to codify Indian birds
- Notable work: Game Birds of Hindostan, 1828 Oriental Ornithology, 1829

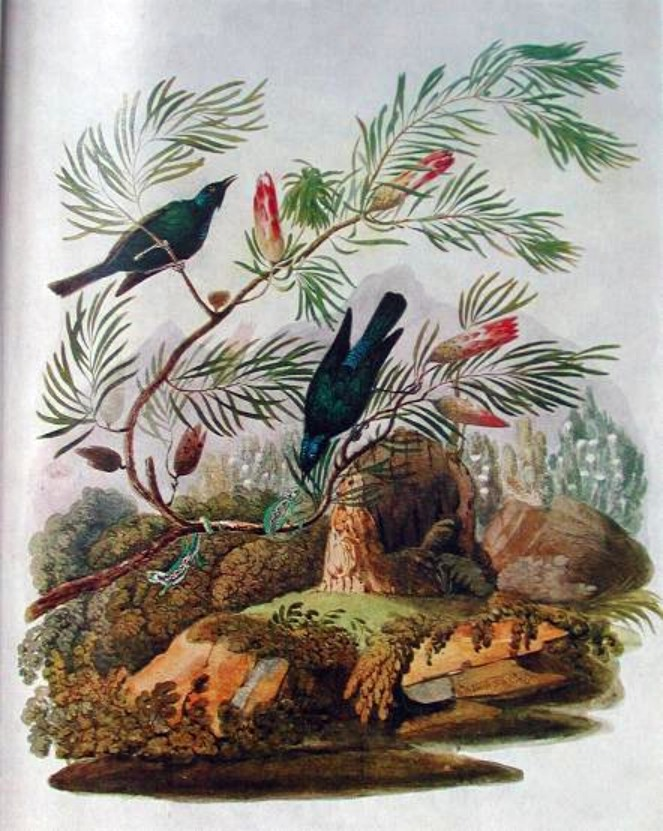

Christopher Webb Smith (30 May 1793 Camberwell – 18 January 1871 Florence) was an English-born bird painter and public official. After joining the East India Company he was sent to India in 1811, where he remained in various administrative posts until 1842 and is remembered as a “gentleman naturalist” who specialised in ornithology and illustration. He was one of the first to codify the birds of India.

== Life and career ==
Smith was born in 1793 at Camberwell, near London, England. He was the son of Captain Donald McKenzie and Anne McLeod (1771-1840), the daughter of John McLeod 91745 -1786), laird of Rasaay in Scotland. Married Annie Jessie MacKenzie (1806- 1862), the daughter of Captain Donald MacKenzie of Hartfields and a native of Scotland in 1824.

As a boy, he had shown an interest in birds. At the Fitzwilliam college, Dr W. Carey encouraged him to study Indian birds. India, with its abundance of wildlife, provided him with the opportunity to take up a serious study birds as a “gentleman naturalist”. During his years in India, he developed the habit of rising early and going out with his gun, shooting selected specimens and returning home to record their size, weight, habitat and make drawings of them. His exhaustive notes demonstrate that he was a talented naturalist and a fine artist.

Smith passed through the training college of the East India Company at Haileybury and Imperial Service College in 1807 and started his service in India in 1811. There he continued his education at Fort William College in Calcutta, graduating with distinction. He soon rose through the ranks, holding a variety of positions, including: 1814 Assistant to the Magistrate at Etawah; 1815 Acting register of Benares City; 1817 Acting judge and magistrate of Shahabad; 1823 Acting judge and magistrate of Patna; 1833 Officiating session judge of Ghazepoor; 1834 Junior Judge of Sudder Board of Revenue.

In August, 1824 at the home of Charles D’Oyly in Bankipore, Webb Smith married Annie Jessie Smith. In the same year, he was transferred to Patna. In December of that year. The Webb Smiths received his cousin, Elizabeth Jane D’Oyly and her husband, Sir Charles D’Oyly who were on a Christmas tour. Doyly was an English baronet, a senior civil servant with the East India Company and a prolific amateur artist. Webb Smith found that he and D’Oyly shared a common interest in natural history and sketching. The pair became firm friends, ultimately leading to the collaboration in two publications in the field of ornithology. They published two illustrated works, namely Game Birds of Hindostan and Oriental Ornithology. The birds were drawn exclusively by Webb Smith while D’Oyly contributed the foregrounds and backgrounds. The majority of the illustrations are dated and bear the names of both C W. Smith and C. D’Oyly.

From 1827 Smith had been based in Arrah, some 40 miles from Patna, and it is likely that he met Sir Charles D'Oyly there. He became a close friend of D'Oyly, who was related by marriage, and both had served in the Bengal Civil Service. While in India, Smith acquired a reputation as ornithological artist and collaborated in producing two books with Sir Charles D'Oyly - The Feathered Game of Hindostan (1828) and Oriental Ornithology (1829), Smith depicting the birds and the foliage, D'Oyly the background landscapes. Smith may have also influenced some of the artists of local artists of the Patna Qalam school who were employed by Charles D'Oyly.

Smith stayed at the Cape of Good Hope from 1837 until 1839 to recover his health. As a result, he and D'Oyly collaborated on a third volume, The Birds, Flowers, and Scenery of the Cape, and finished 56 plates, though the book was never published.

From 1849 to 1860 Smith worked on a critique of the 300 paintings in Florence's Pitti Gallery. The entire work was lost with the sinking of the steamer Black Prince off the coast of Portugal.

== Publications ==
He made hundreds of illustrations of birds, primarily of India and also of the Cape of Good Hope. Webb Smith was one of the first to codify Indian birds. Only a small proportion of those images were published in books.

- Feathered Game of Hindostan, Patna, 1828 with text by Charles Williamson, illustrations by Charles D’Oyly and Christopher Webb Smith
- Oriental Ornithology, Behar Lithographic Press, Patna, 1829 – with text by Charles Williamson and illustrations by Charles D’Oyly and Christopher Webb Smith

=== Collections ===
• A collection of approximately 295 watercolour paintings of birds now in Balfour and Newton Library, Cambridge. • A collection of 500 + water colour paintings of African and Indian birds and scenes now in the Department of Zoology, Cambridge University

== Bibliography ==
- Christopher Webb Smith: An Artist at the Cape of Good Hope, 1837-1839, by A. Gordon-Brown. Cape Town: H. Timmins; 1965.
- From Merchants to Emperors: British Artists in India, 1757-1930, by Pratapaditya Pal and Vidya Dehejia. Cornell University Press; 1987.
- Splendid Plumage: Indian birds by British artists, by Jagmohan Mahajan; with descriptions of birds by Bikram Grewal. Hong Kong: Local Colour Limited; 1965.
