= John Cator =

English timber merchant and politician

John Cator (21 March 1728 – 26 February 1806) was an English timber merchant and politician who sat in the House of Commons between 1772 and 1793. He became a landowner and property developer with estates in later life in: Blackheath, Beckenham, Addington, Croydon and Waltham Forest – now in London, then in Kent, Surrey and Essex; at Leigh and Hever in Kent.

== Business ==
The son of John Cator the Elder, a Herefordshire timber merchant and Quaker (who in turn was the son of Jonah Cator of Ross-on-Wye, a glovemaker), Cator joined the family business which had relocated to a new London base at Mould Strand Wharf (now the Bankside site of the Tate Modern art gallery) in Southwark, and sought to capitalise on the growth of the capital by investing in property, mainly in south-east London and Kent. He married Mary Collinson (daughter of botanist Peter Collinson) in 1753. In 1778, Fanny Burney wrote:

"Mr. C--, who was formerly a timber-merchant, but having amassed a fortune of one million of pounds, he has left off business. He is a good-natured busy sort of man."

At one time Cator negotiated lending money to the Prince Regent and his brothers but withdrew in case it was seen by lawyers as treasonable as repayment details turned on the death of the ailing King.

He was MP for Wallingford from 1772 to 1780. Following his election for Ipswich in 1784, his rival Charles Crickitt took out a successful petition against him accusing him of bribery. He was then elected for Stockbridge from 1790 to 1793. He was appointed High Sheriff of Kent for 1780–81.

== Beckenham ==
Cator's first land purchase in Beckenham/Lewisham was at Stump's Hill in 1757, where he built a house between 1760 and 1762 on part of what was Foxgrove Manor lands. His father-in-law visited in September 1762, commenting:

"... went, for the first time, to visit my son-in-law John Cater [sic] (who married my daughter), at his new-built house, now finished, at Stump's Hill, half-way (on the south side of the road) between Southend and Beckenham, in Kent, began in the spring 1760, on a pretty wooded estate that he had purchased. The plantations about it, all of his own doing, I found in a thriving condition, and when grown up will adorn so stately a house, in so delectable a situation, and make it a Paradise."

In 1773, he became Lord of the Manor of Beckenham, having purchased the land from Lord Bolingbroke. Bolingbroke had previously exchanged the old manor house for Woolseys Farm with the Burrells. Cator was established at Stumps Hill and whether the house of 1760 was altered is unknown but it was eventually altered to a more Palladian-style mansion with the epithet 'Beckenham Place' (attribution unknown, but may be architect Sir Robert Taylor), much admired by Dr Samuel Johnson. The purchase from Bolingbroke was fraught with problems as Bolingbroke had previously leased the manor lands to a Mrs. Hare and court cases went on until 1780. After Cator acquired full control of the Beckenham Manor lands he exchanged property with the Burrells of Kelsey and Langley so that he had a contiguous estate north of Beckenham village; the Burrells under Peter Burrell/Lord Gwydyr had most of the land south of the village after 1793. Cator's land dealings, money lending and business affairs will perhaps never be fully understood. He was a shareholder in the East India Company and some of his brothers worked for the Company.

Cator Park and Cator Road are named after John Cator.

== Blackheath ==
Around 1783, slightly closer to central London at Blackheath, Cator bought the Wricklemarsh mansion (formerly owned by Sir Gregory Page) and its 250-acre (1 km^{2}) estate for a bargain £22,250. The Palladian mansion (designed by architect John James) was gradually demolished from 1787 onwards and Cator began to break up the estate into small packages of land to be individually developed. Among the earliest commissions was one for architect Michael Searles to design a 14-house crescent, 'The Paragon', on the south side of the Heath. Some of its colonnades are said to incorporate pillars used in Page's mansion.

== The Cator estates ==
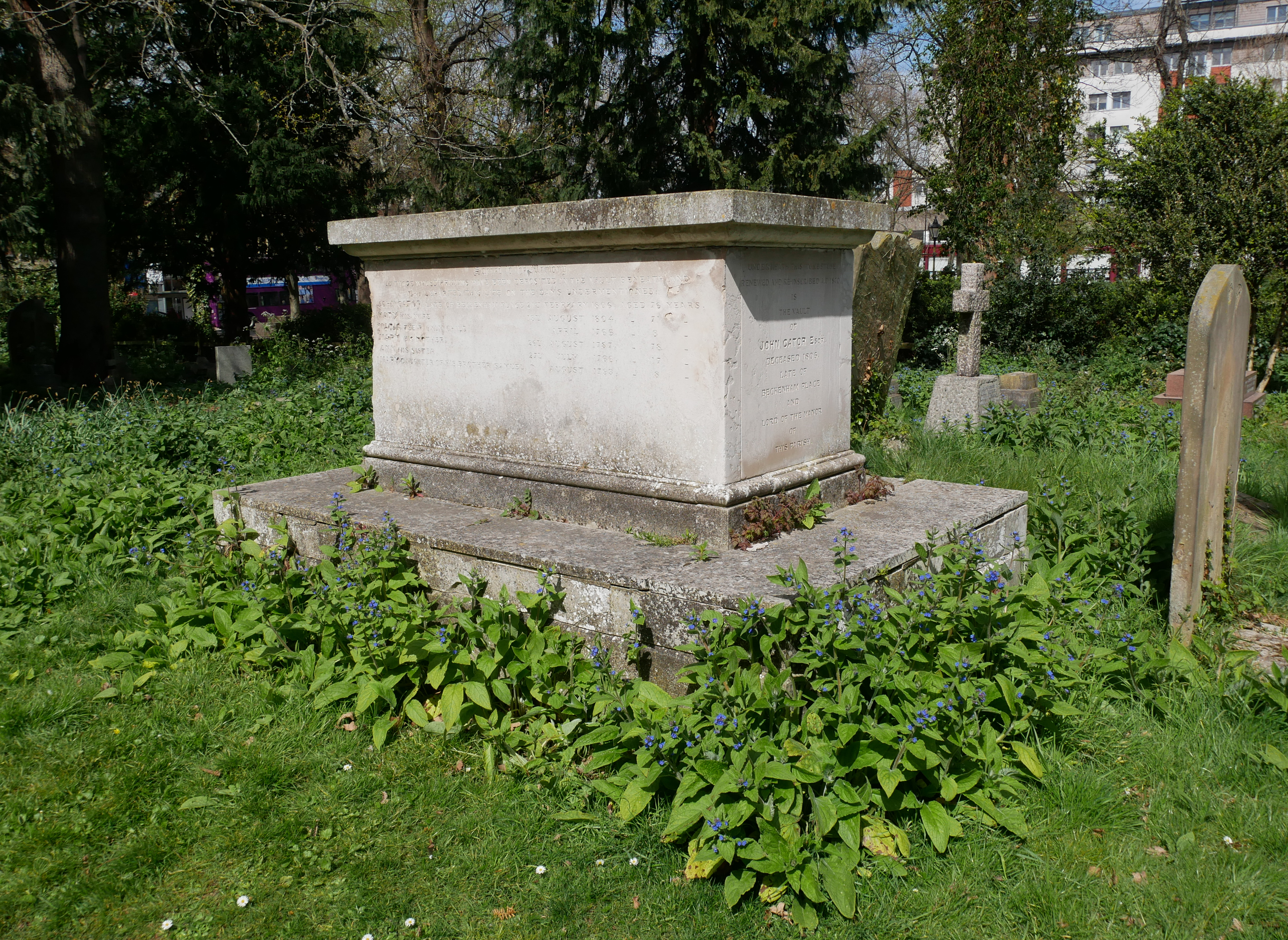
The Cator family chest tomb to the north of the Church of Saint George, Beckenham

Cator died in London in 1806 at his Adelphi apartment and was buried in the churchyard of St George's Church, Beckenham. At the time of his death he had property in Beckenham, Croydon, Addington, Leigh, Chiddingstone, Waltham Forest, Chingford and a small amount in Hereford which had been his father's. His only child a daughter Maria had died in infancy so he had no direct heir.

Cator's Estate Act 1825
- Act of Parliament
- Parliament of the United Kingdom
- Long title: An Act to enable John Cator, Esquire, to grant Building Leases of Lands in the Counties of Kent, Surrey, Essex and Hereford; and also for vesting in Trustees for Sale Part of the Estates in the said Counties devised by the Will of John Cator Esquire, deceased, and for laying out the Money arising from such Sales respectively, under the Direction of the High Court of Chancery, in the Purchase of other Estates to be settled to the same Uses; and for other Purposes.
- Citation: 6 Geo. 4. c. 38 Pr.

Dates
- Royal assent: 27 June 1825

His estates were inherited by his nephew John Barwell Cator (1791–1850), who "with a young man's flair, exploited the Blackheath estate with style and profit," though it was not until the mid 1820s that building started in earnest. J. Barwell Cator had purchased estates in Woodbastwick in Norfolk (Woodbastwick Hall is still the family seat), and it later fell to other Cators – his younger brother Peter Cator (1796-1873) and son Albemarle Cator (1813-1868) – to expand the developments of Beckenham and Blackheath to take advantage of the growth of the railway network during the mid 19th century. John Cator had intended the Beckenham Estates to remain intact for the family but a private act of Parliament, the Cator's Estate Act 1825 (6 Geo. 4. c. 38 Pr.), permitted J. Barwell Cator and other trustees of the estate to sell or lease property with the intention of replacing sales with other purchases so Woodbastwick expanded, and the family under Albemarle Cator also acquired property in Trewsbury in Gloucestershire.

The upmarket Blackheath Park neighbourhood south-east of the heath itself bears alternate name "the Cator Estate".

John Barwell Cator's descendant, Elizabeth Cator (died 1959) was the mother of Fergus Bowes-Lyon, 17th Earl of Strathmore and Kinghorne.

Parliament of Great Britain
Preceded by Robert Pigot; John Aubrey	Member of Parliament for Wallingford; 1772–1780; With: John Aubrey to 1774; Robert Barker 1774–80	Succeeded by Chaloner Arcedeckne; John Aubrey
Preceded by William Wollaston; Thomas Staunton	Member of Parliament for Ipswich; April 1784 – June 1784; With: William Middleton	Succeeded by Charles Crickitt; William Middleton
Preceded by James Gordon; Thomas Boothby Parkyns	Member of Parliament for Stockbridge; 1790–1793; With: John Scott	Succeeded by Joseph Foster Barham; George Porter
