= Sir John D'Oyly, 6th Baronet =

British politician (1754–1818)

Sir John Hadley D'Oyly Bt
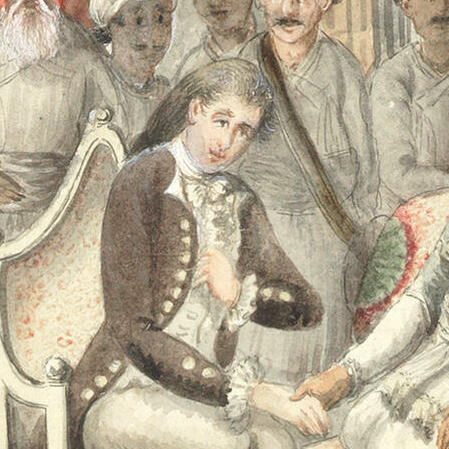

Member of the Great Britain Parliament for Ipswich
- In office 1790–1796 Serving with Charles Crickitt
- Preceded by: William Middleton; Charles Crickitt
- Succeeded by: Sir Andrew Hamond, Bt.; Charles Crickitt

Personal details
- Born: January 1754 Ipswich, England
- Died: 5 January 1818 Calcutta, Bengal Presidency, British India
- Party: Whig

Sir John Hadley D'Oyly, 6th Baronet (January 1754, Ipswich – 5 January 1818, Calcutta, Bengal, British India) was a politician in Great Britain. He primarily inherited debt when his father died when he was ten, but through family connections had a successful career with the East India Company. Returning to Ipswich a wealthy man, he settled his fathers debts and aligned himself with the Ipswich Yellow Party. He served as the MP for the town for several years in the 1790s. He returned to India in 1803 where he lived until his death in 1818.

== Early life ==
His father, Hadley D'Oyly, was rector of Wotton and Felixstowe. His mother was Henrietta Maynard Osborne, daughter of Reverend Henry Osborne, the Vicar of Thaxted, Essex. His father died when John was ten years old, only leaving debt as a legacy. His mother educated him herself until through the influence of Charles Bunbury, John entered the service of the East India Company (EIC) in 1769 as a "writer", i.e. a junior clerical worker.

== Career with the East India Company ==
However John progressed, becoming a Persian translator in 1775 for the EIC Army, a mercantile factor in 1776, Sheriff of Kolkata for 1779. In this year he married Diana Rochfort, widow of William Cotes of Calcutta and was appointed Resident for Murshidabad, whilst also becoming first a junior merchant (1780) and then a senior merchant (1782) with the EIC. However in 1785 his wife became ill and he took his family back to England with him.

=== Residency at Murshidabad ===
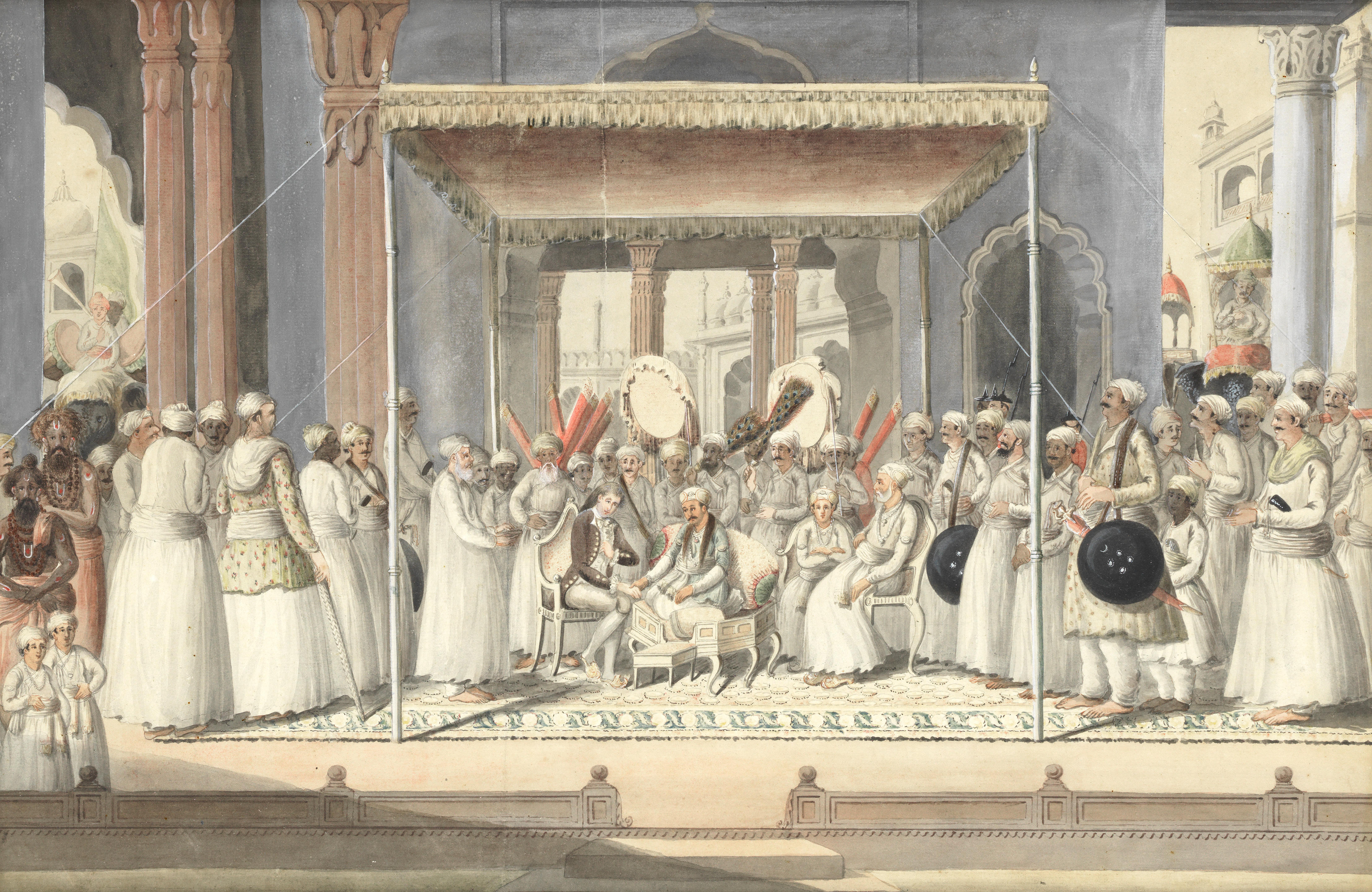
Mubarak ud Daula Nawab of Murshidabad and Sir John Hadley D'Oyly in about 1800

D'Oyly took over the residency at Murshidabad following the resignation of William Byam Martin in January 1780. He arrived that February with instructions from Warren Hastings, the Governor General of Bengal to encourage Mubarak Ali Khan, the Nawab of Bengal to adopt "effectual measures" to curb his spending which was greater than his income.

== Career in England ==
He returned to England in 1785 as a nabob with a fortune of over £100,000. He used some of this to settle his father's debts.

He was Member of Parliament (MP) for Ipswich from 1790 to 1796 as a Whig.

== Return to India ==
His wife died on 6 September 1803, and John returned to India filling the post of collector of customs, at Kolkata. In 1807 he was appointed Postmaster General and salt agent for Bengal. He died in 1818 and was buried in the South Park Street Cemetery in Calcutta (today Kolkata), India.

== Family ==
He married Diana Rochfort, daughter of William Rochfort (grandson of Robert Rochfort and Henry Hamilton-Moore, 3rd Earl of Drogheda) and Henrietta Ramsay, on 16 March 1779 in Calcutta, India.

- Harriet Rochfort D'Oyly (1777-1833)
- Sir Charles D'Oyly, 7th Baronet (18 Sep 1781-21 Sep 1845)
- Maynard Eliza D'Oyly (1785-21 Jun 1866). She married firstly Walter Farquhar (d. 1809), son of Sir Walter Farquhar, 1st Baronet. After his death she married Rev. Thomas Snow. They had three sons, and three daughters.
- Sir John Hadley D'Oyly, 8th Baronet (29 Sep 1794-21 Mar 1869)

== Arms ==
Coat of arms of Sir John D'Oyly, 6th Baronet
Crest Out of a ducal coronet Or two wings erect Sable bezantée between which and resting on the strawberry leaf of the coronet an estoile of six points Argent. Escutcheon Gules three bucks' heads cabossed Argent. Motto Do Noe Ylle Quoth D'Oylle (Do No Ill, Quoth Doyle)

Parliament of Great Britain
Preceded by William Middleton and Charles Crickitt	Member of Parliament for Ipswich; 1790–1796; With: Charles Crickitt	Succeeded by Sir Andrew Hamond, Bt. and Charles Crickitt
Baronetage of the United Kingdom
Preceded by Hadley D'Oyly	Baronet (of Shottisham); 1764–1818	Succeeded by Charles D'Oyly
