= Elizabeth Ross (poet) =

Elizabeth Jane Ross
- Born: 17 September 1789; Perth, Scotland
- Died: 1 June 1875 (aged 85); Dorset, England
- Known for: Poet, artist, and collector of Gaelic Music

Elizabeth Jane Ross (17 September 1789 – 1 June 1875) was a Scottish poet, artist, and collector of Gaelic music.

== Life ==
She was born to Captain Thomas Ross, a gunner assistant in the Royal Artillery who was badly wounded at the Siege of Seringapatam (now is the territory of India) in 1792, and Isabella Rose Macleod in Perth, Scotland. Her father was an Army officer who had served in the Caribbean and was stationed in India at the time of Elizabeth's birth. Her mother, was Isabella Rose Macleod, the 8th daughter of John Macleod of Raasay.

Both her parents died when she was very young. Shortly after her father's death in 1794, her sister was born and named Isabella Rose, after her mother, and was baptised at St. Mary's Church, Fort St. George (Madraspatnam). Afterwards, the two siblings moved back to Raasay. The mother's fate remains uncertain, but it was possible that her mother died and was buried on the sea during the voyage home from India. She attended Mary Erskine School in Edinburgh. She and her sister became wards of the then Governor-General in India, the Marquis of Hastings who was married to their second cousin, the Countess of Louton. The sisters were sent to Scotland to be raised by a relative (probably her maternal grandfather, John McLeod (1761-1824), laird of Raasay) (an island between Skye and the mainland). She was educated in Edinburgh where she lived with an aunt

The Macleods were a very musical family. Elizabeth's grandfather played the violin, while other menfolk were all pipers. Elizabeth became an accomplished musician, playing piano and concert harp. By her early 20s, she had transcribed 150 Gaelic airs, based on the playing of John McKay, piper to the laird of Raasay. She recorded these airs in a manuscript entitled “Original Highland airs, transcribed by Elizabeth Jane Ross, 1812” which she left in the Library of Raasay House and which were given to the Edinburgh University Library in the 1950s. McKay later composed an air, Fàilte Baintighearna D’Oyly [Lady D’Oyly's Salute] in her honour. A descendant of the McLeod family's piper, Angus McKay, wrote of Elizabeth's musical aptitude and her fondness for the piper in the following terms: Her musical taste was remarkably good, and she was so fond of Pìobaireachd [bagpipes], that she acquired many of the longest pieces from the performance of the family Piper, and was accustomed to play them on the piano with much effect.... She [never] forgot MacKay, the Piper of Raasay, but had an elegant stand of Pipes, of peculiar native workmanship, prepared, which she presented to him.

In 1813, she accompanied her cousin, the Marchioness of Hastings, to India. The Marchioness was related to the Governor-General, Marquis Hastings who invited the travelling party to stay at Government House as his guests. There Elizabeth met Baronet Charles D’Oyly, who at that time was serving as an honorary aide to the Governor-General. D’Oyly was immediately impressed by Elizabeth's sociability, her musicianship and her sketching. The pair were married in 1817.

In 1815, she married Charles D'Oyly and resided in India until 1838, when her husband's sickness forced them to leave the country, then returned to Britain before moving to Italy. Elizabeth's husband was a senior civil servant with the East India Company. In his spare time, he sketched incessantly, gaining a reputation as a talented amateur artist. Elizabeth shared an interest in sketching with her husband. As her husband's paintings and sketches of social life in India gained popularity with colonials, he established his own lithographic printing company, the Behar Lithographic Printing Company. He painted his wife's portrait and also produced many sketches of her seated at the harp in their drawing room. He also included some of Elizabeth's sketches in his published works.

The couple were known for their hospitality and sociability. They entertained leading members of colonial society. The painter George Chinnery stayed with the D’Oylys in Dacca during 1802–03. Brian Houghton Hodgson also stayed with the couple when he first arrived in India. With their connections to elite society, the D’Oyly's introduced Houghton to society and helped him establish connections with high officials of the Indian government. Hodgson and the D’Oylys shared an interest in the arts, He and Elizabeth became lifelong friends. Even after her husband's death, Elizabeth continued to make an annual visit to their friend, Hodgson, at Adderly.

She and her husband remained in India until 1838, after which they travelled to the Cape. Sometime later, Charles retired due to poor health. The pair returned to England briefly, after which they took up residence in Livorno in Italy. Following her husband's death in 1845, Elizabeth returned to England and lived most of final years at Preston House, Steepleton Iwerne in Dorset, making occasional visits to the Macleod family home in Scotland. She died at Steepleton Iwerne on 1 June 1875, aged 86.

The couple also established a lithographic press and the 'Behar School of Athens', a society for artists. After her husband's death in 1845, she moved to Dorset till her death and maintaining her highland heritage. The D’Oylys had no children. After her death, Elizabeth's belongings were left to various members of the Macleod family.

== Work and Manuscript ==
She started putting interests in arts and music at very young age. It is believed that she had really good ground in music, taking a lively part in domestic music-making. Angus MacKay, the son of John MacKay described her as having a very remarkable taste of music, being fond of Pìobaireachd, as she managed to play the longest pieces from the performance of the family piper and used to play the pieces in piano with much effect. She started writing the manuscript of Gaelic Music at the age of 23. In 1875, she published Orain Ghaidhlig, a set of four poems which later is included in Oranaiche, an anthology of Gaelic verse. In 2011, the School of Scottish Studies Archives of the University of Edinburgh released "The Manuscript of Elizabeth Ross", a compilation of Original Highland Airs, collected by her at Raasay in 1812. Later in 2016, The Musica Scotica Trust re-released the compilation.

Her pencil sketches demonstrate a lightness of touch that was on a par with her husband. Her portraits of Indian women have survived to the present day and her husband included some of her sketches in a number of his publications, notably the Behar Lithographic Press Scrapbook (1828). Examples of her work can be found in the India Office Library. ,

== Legacy ==
The manuscript of Scottish airs transcribed by Elizabeth has been archived by the University of Edinburgh for its cultural and historical significance. It is one of the earliest attempts to record pibrochs as they were performed at the time.
