= William Fowle Middleton =

English politician

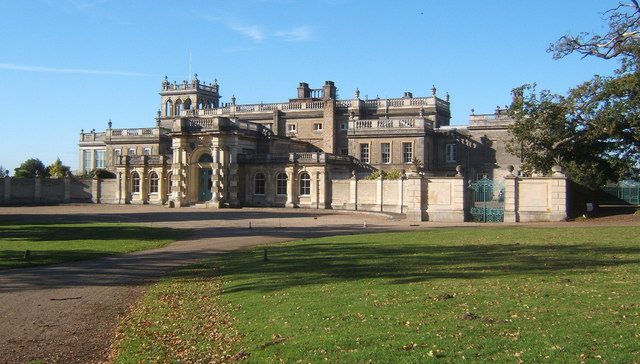
Shrubland Hall as remodelled by the 2nd Baronet

Sir William Fowle Middleton, 1st Baronet (8 November 1748 – 26 December 1829) was an English Member of Parliament and High Sheriff.

He was born William Middleton in Charleston, South Carolina, the eldest son of William Middleton of Crowfield and the grandson of Arthur Middleton, acting governor of South Carolina. He was educated at Bury St Edmunds Grammar School and Caius College, Cambridge and succeeded his father in 1775.

He was pricked High Sheriff of Suffolk for 1782–83. In 1784 he was elected MP for Ipswich, sitting until 1790. He was re-elected for the same constituency for 1803 to 1806 and finally for Hastings in 1806. He was created a baronet in 1804.

He purchased the Shrubland estate in the late 1700s and in 1823 adopted the additional name of Fowle under the will of John Fowle of Broome, Norfolk.

He had married Harriot, the daughter and eventual heiress of Nathaniel Acton of Bramford Hall, Suffolk and had 1 son and 2 daughters. He was succeeded by his only son, Sir William Fowle Middleton, 2nd Baronet. His daughter Sarah Louisa married Philip Broke, later Rear-Admiral Sir Philip Bowes Vere Broke, 1st Baronet.

== See also ==
- Middleton baronets

Parliament of Great Britain
Preceded by William Wollaston; Thomas Staunton	Member of Parliament for Ipswich; 1784–1790; With: John Cator to Jun 1784; Charles Crickitt from Jun 1784	Succeeded by Sir John D'Oyly, 6th Baronet; Charles Crickitt
Parliament of the United Kingdom
Preceded by Sir Andrew Hamond, 1st Baronet; Charles Crickitt	Member of Parliament for Ipswich; 1803–1806; With: Sir Andrew Hamond, 1st Baronet	Succeeded by Richard Wilson; Robert Stopford
Preceded by The Lord Glenbervie; George William Gunning	Member of Parliament for Hastings; 1806–1807; With: Sir John Nicholl	Succeeded by George Canning; Sir Abraham Hume, 2nd Baronet
Baronetage of the United Kingdom
New creation	Baronet (of Crowfield); 1804–1829	Succeeded by William Middleton
