= Charles Crickitt =

British politician

Charles Alexander Crickitt (12 January 1736 – 16 January 1803) was an English banker and politician. He was a Member of Parliament for Ipswich from 1784 until his death in 1803.

Crickitt started his banking career in Colchester in 1774, and set up the bank Crickitt, Truelove & Kerridge with William Truelove and J. Kerridge in 1786 in Ipswich. This was the "Blue" bank, linked to the Ipswich Blue Party.

On 29 June 1789 he fought a duel with Nicholas Corsellis in Lexden Heath. The duel arose following an incident the previous Saturday in which Reverend Corsellis had used severe language. Neither party was injured.

He was godson to the Lord Commissioner of the Admiralty Bamber Gascoyne.

Parliament of the United Kingdom
Preceded by William Middleton; John Cator	Member of Parliament for Ipswich; 1784–1803; With: William Middleton, Sir John D'Oyly, Sir Andrew Hamond	Succeeded by William Middleton; Sir Andrew Hamond
